= Schwabing Art Prize =

German literary Prize

Since 1961, the Schwabing Art Prize has been awarded annually by the city of Munich to persons or institutions that have their seat in the Munich district Schwabing or whose achievements have been made "in the spirit of Schwabing tradition". It is based on a civic initiative of the writer Florian Seidl and the then Süddeutsche Zeitung co-partner Hans Dürrmeier.

Until 2012, two prizes of 5,000 Euro each as well as an unendowed Honorary Prize were awarded. Donors are the Kulturstiftung der Stadtsparkasse München, Karl Eisenrieder – Cafė Münchner Freiheit, Constantin Film AG and the Landeshauptstadt München. The prize winners are selected by a jury of five members.

In 2013, thanks to a further foundation of the Stadtsparkasse München, three prizes of 5,000 Euro each were awarded for the first time.

== Laureates ==
=== 1961 until 1970 ===
- 1961: Karl Amadeus Hartmann (Musik)
- 1961: Peter Paul Althaus (Literatur)
- 1961: Erwin von Kreibig (Malerei und Grafik)
- 1961: Emil Krieger (Plastik/Bildhauerei)
- 1961: Pamela Wedekind (Darbietende Kunst)
- 1961: Wilhelm Hüsgen (Ehrenpreis)
- 1962: Alfred von Beckerath (Musik)
- 1962: Ernst Hoferichter (Literatur)
- 1962: Bele Bachem (Malerei und Grafik)
- 1962: Arno Schiffers (Malerei und Grafik)
- 1962: E. R. Nele (Plastik/Bildhauerei)
- 1962: Marietta di Monaco (Darbietende Kunst)
- 1962: Ernst Klotz (Ehrenpreis)
- 1963: Lach- und Schießgesellschaft (Darbietende Kunst)
- 1963: Philippine Schick (Musik)
- 1963: Rudolf Schmitt-Sulzthal (Literatur)
- 1963: Willi Geiger (Malerei und Grafik)
- 1963: Lothar Dietz (Plastik/Bildhauerei)
- 1963: Max Schultes und Bertl Schultes (Schauspieler; Ehrenpreis)
- 1964: Oswald Malura (Malerei und Grafik)
- 1964: Carl Feilitzsch (Musik)
- 1964: Rolf Flügel (Literatur)
- 1964: Ferdinand Filler (Plastik/Bildhauerei)
- 1964: Gisela Jonas (Darbietende Kunst)
- 1964: Georg Britting (Ehrenpreis postum)
- 1965: Friedrich Meyer (Musik)
- 1965: Wugg Retzer (Literatur)
- 1965: Wilhelm Drixelius (Malerei und Grafik)
- 1965: Will Elfes (Plastik/Bildhauerei)
- 1965: Jean Launay (Darbietende Kunst)
- 1965: Marionettentheater Kleines Spiel (Ehrenpreis)
- 1966: Ludwig Kusche (Musik)
- 1966: Wolfgang von Weber (Literatur)
- 1966: Rudolf Kriesch (Malerei und Grafik)
- 1966: Helmut Ammann (Plastik/Bildhauerei)
- 1966: Werner Finck (Darbietende Kunst)
- 1966: Hannes König (Darbietende Kunst)
- 1966: Wolf Peter Schnetz (Ehrenpreis)
- 1967: Theo Roßmann (Musik)
- 1967: Hans Brandenburg (Literatur)
- 1967: Herbert Schneider (Malerei und Grafik)
- 1967: Lothar Fischer (Plastik/Bildhauerei)
- 1967: Ursula Herking (Darbietende Kunst)
- 1967: Theodor Dombart (Ehrenpreis)
- 1968: Anton Sailer (Literatur)
- 1968: Bernhard Eichhorn (Musik)
- 1968: Hanna Axmann-Rezzori (Malerei und Grafik)
- 1968: Jörg Wisbeck (Malerei und Grafik)
- 1968: Alexander Fischer (Plastik/Bildhauerei)
- 1968: Fifi Brix (Ehrenpreis)
- 1969: Rupert Stöckl (Malerei und Grafik)
- 1969: Edmund Nick (Musik)
- 1969: Ernst Günther Bleisch (Literatur)
- 1969: Silvia Quandt (Malerei und Grafik)
- 1969: Waki Zöllner (Plastik/Bildhauerei)
- 1969: Gertrud Dahlmann-Stolzenbach (Darbietende Kunst)
- 1969: Anton Würz (Musikwissenschaftler, Musikkritiker und Autor des Reclams Operettenführers; Ehrenpreis)
- 1970: Sepp Eibl (Musik)
- 1970: Peter Kreuder (Musik)
- 1970: Eugen Skasa-Weiß (Literatur)
- 1970: Ernst Hürlimann (Malerei und Grafik)
- 1970: Georg Brenninger (Plastik/Bildhauerei)
- 1970: Hanna Schygulla (Darbietende Kunst)
- 1970: Tilly Wedekind (Ehrenpreis)

=== 1971 until 1980 ===
- 1971: Joachim Faber (Musik)
- 1971: Ellis Kaut (Literatur)
- 1971: Willi Kruse (Malerei und Grafik)
- 1971: Luis Murschetz (Malerei und Grafik)
- 1971: Elmar Dietz (Plastik/Bildhauerei)
- 1971: Theater SPIELDOSE (in Künstlerhaus am Lenbachplatz; Darbietende Kunst)
- 1971: Fritz Falter (Kinobesitzer und Mitbegründer der Gilde deutscher Filmkunsttheater e. V.; Ehrenpreis)
- 1972: Friedrich Hollaender (Musik)
- 1972: Wilhelm Lukas Kristl (Literatur)
- 1972: Toni Trepte (Malerei und Grafik)
- 1972: Karl Röhrig (Plastik/Bildhauerei)
- 1972: Uta Emmer (Darbietende Kunst)
- 1972: Herbert Günther (Ehrenpreis)
- 1972: Florian Seidl (Ehrenpreis als seinerzeitiger Initiator des Preises)
- 1973: Else Stock-Hug (Musik)
- 1973: Oda Schaefer (Literatur)
- 1973: Eugen Cordier (Malerei und Grafik)
- 1973: Nikolaus Gerhart (Plastik/Bildhauerei)
- 1973: Heino Hallhuber (Darbietende Kunst)
- 1974: Rudolf Wachter (Plastik/Bildhauerei)
- 1974: Hedwig von Branca (Ehrenpreis)
- 1974: Bruno Aulich (Musik)
- 1974: Wolfgang Christlieb (Literatur)
- 1974: Hermann Geiseler (Malerei und Grafik)
- 1974: Margot Werner (Darbietende Kunst)
- 1975: Eberhard Schoener (Musik)
- 1975: Kurt Seeberger (Literatur)
- 1975: Erwin Shoultz-Carrnoff (Malerei und Grafik)
- 1975: Ruth Kiener-Flamm (Plastik/Bildhauerei)
- 1975: Die Katakombe (Darbietende Kunst)
- 1975: Kurt Horwitz (Ehrenpreis)
- 1976: Dietrich Ammende (Musik)
- 1976: Sigi Sommer (Literatur)
- 1976: Kurt P. Lohwasser (Malerei und Grafik)
- 1976: Franz Eska (Plastik/Bildhauerei)
- 1976: Peter Pasetti (Darbietende Kunst)
- 1976: Hanns Goebl (Ehrenpreis)
- 1977: Ensemble KEKK (Darbietende Kunst)
- 1977: Fritz Büchtger (Musik)
- 1977: Karl Ude (Literatur)
- 1977: Edith Meinel (Malerei und Grafik)
- 1977: Johannes Leismüller (Plastik/Bildhauerei)
- 1977: Karl Köglsperger (Ehrenpreis)
- 1978: Fabius von Gugel (Malerei und Grafik)
- 1978: Wilfried Hiller (Musik)
- 1978: Helmut Zöpfl (Literatur)
- 1978: Marlene Neubauer-Woerner (Plastik/Bildhauerei)
- 1978: Philip Arp (Darbietende Kunst)
- 1978: Erwin Faber (Ehrenpreis)
- 1979: Wolfgang Bächler (Literatur)
- 1979: Josef Anton Riedl (Musik)
- 1979: Ernst Maria Lang (Malerei und Grafik)
- 1979: Konrad Balder Schäuffelen (Plastik/Bildhauerei)
- 1979: Eva Vaitl (Darbietende Kunst)
- 1979: Franz Henrich (Ehrenpreis)
- 1980: Joerg Holler (Musik)
- 1980: Ursula von Kardorff (Literatur)
- 1980: Josef Oberberger (Malerei und Grafik)
- 1980: Marianne Rousselle (Plastik/Bildhauerei)
- 1980: Anette Spola (Darbietende Kunst)
- 1980: Autorenbuchhandlung (Buchhandlung in Schwabing, Ehrenpreis)

=== 1981 until 1990 ===
- 1981: Walter Kabel (Musik)
- 1981: Franz Ringseis (Literatur)
- 1981: Horst Haitzinger (Malerei und Grafik)
- 1981: Susanne Hepfinger (Plastik/Bildhauerei)
- 1981: Tanzprojekt München (Darbietende Kunst)
- 1981: Gunter Groll (Autor und Filmkritiker, Ehrenpreis)
- 1982: Willy Michl (Musik)
- 1982: Christine Stadler (Plastik/Bildhauerei)
- 1982: Marianne Sägebrecht (Darbietende Kunst)
- 1982: Albert von Schirnding (Literatur)
- 1982: Michael Heininger (Malerei und Grafik)
- 1982: Hans Wimmer (Ehrenpreis)
- 1983: Freddie Brocksieper (Musik)
- 1983: Jürgen von Hollander (Literatur)
- 1983: Franz Ferry Hauber (Malerei und Grafik)
- 1983: Rolf Nida-Rümelin (Plastik / Bildhauerei)
- 1983: Eisi Gulp (Darbietende Kunst)
- 1983: Hans-Reinhard Müller (Ehrenpreis)
- 1984: Roberto C. Détrée (Musik)
- 1984: Wolfgang Ebert (Literatur)
- 1984: Dieter Hanitzsch (Malerei und Grafik)
- 1984: Hubert Elsässer (Bildhauerei)
- 1984: Gunnar Holm-Petersen und das Studiotheater (Darbietende Kunst)
- 1984: Ponkie (Ehrenpreis)
- 1985: Gudrun Haag (Musik)
- 1985: Bernhard Pollak (Autor)
- 1985: Heinz Gruchot (Malerei und Grafik)
- 1985: Annemone Schneck (Plastik/Bildhauerei)
- 1985: Lisa Fitz (Darbietende Kunst)
- 1985: Armin Eichholz (Journalist, Ehrenpreis)
- 1986: Walter Haupt (Musik)
- 1986: Gerty Spies (Literatur)
- 1986: Maximilian Seitz (Malerei und Grafik)
- 1986: Marie Luise Wilckens (Plastik/Bildhauerei)
- 1986: Münchner Crüppel Cabaret (Darbietende Kunst)
- 1986: Hansjörg Schmitthenner (Ehrenpreis)
- 1987: Peter Ludwig (Musik)
- 1987: Dagmar Nick (Literatur)
- 1987: Albert Ferenz (Malerei und Grafik)
- 1987: Gerd Jaeger (Plastik/Bildhauerei)
- 1987: Manuela Riva (Darbietende Kunst)
- 1987: Helmut Dietl (Ehrenpreis)
- 1988: Keto von Waberer (Literatur)
- 1988: Peter Michael Hamel (Musik)
- 1988: Wolfgang Gerner (Malerei)
- 1988: Josef Seidl-Seitz (Grafik)
- 1988: Irmhild Wagner (Darbietende Kunst)
- 1988: Hans Lietzau (Ehrenpreis)
- 1989: Sarah Pelikan (Malerei und Grafik)
- 1989: Elisabeth Endres (Journalistin)
- 1989: Markus Heinsdorff (Plastik/Bildhauerei)
- 1989: Dietrich "Piano" Paul (Darbietende Kunst)
- 1989: Elfriede Kuzmany (Ehrenpreis)
- 1990: Peter Kiesewetter (Musik)
- 1990: Michael Krüger (Literatur)
- 1990: Irma Hünerfauth (Objektkunst und Grafik)
- 1990: Thomas Lehnerer (Plastik/Bildhauerei)
- 1990: Günter Knoll (Darbietende Kunst)
- 1990: Bernhard Wicki (Ehrenpreis)

=== 1991 until 2000 ===
- 1991: Theater der Jugend (Darbietende Kunst)
- 1991: Haralampi G. Oroschakoff (Bildende Kunst)
- 1992: Verlag Antje Kunstmann (Literatur)
- 1992: Sigrid Neubert (Fotografin)
- 1993: Dirk Heißerer (Literatur)
- 1993: Reiner Zimnik (Karikaturist)
- 1993: Hans Dieter Beck (Verleger; Ehrenpreis)
- 1994: Michael Skasa (Autor, Journalist)
- 1994: Jörg Maurers Unterton (Theater)
- 1994: Kurt Wilhelm (Ehrenpreis)
- 1995: Klaus Lea (Galerist)
- 1995: Ägidius Geisselmann (Bildender Künstler)
- 1995: Sabine Toepffer (Fotografie, Ehrenpreis)
- 1996: Margaret Kassajep (Autorin, Journalistin)
- 1996: Nick Woodland (Blues-Gitarrist)
- 1996: Helmut Lesch (Beck Forum, Ehrenpreis)
- 1997: Kurt Weinzierl and Veronika Faber (Schauspieler)
- 1997: Volker Derlath (Fotograf)
- 1997: Rita Rottenwallner (Tollwood-Festival; Ehrenpreis)
- 1998: Dusko Goykovich (Jazzmusiker)
- 1998: Ingrid Seidenfaden (Journalistin)
- 1998: Lutz Neumann und Wolfgang Ettlich (Theater Heppel & Ettlich; Ehrenpreis)
- 1999: Susanne Weinhöppel (Schriftstellerin)
- 1999: Horst A. Reichel und Irmhild Wagner (Theater44)
- 1999: Jörg Hube (Schauspieler; Ehrenpreis)
- 2000: Eva Hesse (Übersetzerin)
- 2000: Helmut Ruge (Kabarettist)
- 2000: Klaus von Gaffron (Fotokünstler; Ehrenpreis)

=== 2001 until 2010 ===
- 2001: Alfons Ostermeier (Theatermaler)
- 2001: Michael Sailer (Schriftsteller und Musiker)
- 2001: Tilde Michels (Kinderbuchautorin; Ehrenpreis)
- 2002: Gerhard Weiss (Figurentheatermacher)
- 2002: Loomit (Graffiti-Künstler)
- 2002: Hugo Strasser (Bandleader; Ehrenpreis)
- 2003: Ali Mitgutsch (Kinderbuchautor und -illustrator)
- 2003: Ursula Haeusgen (Lyrik Kabinett)
- 2003: Spider Murphy Gang (Ehrenpreis)
- 2004: Marionettentheater Kleines Spiel
- 2004: Herwig Kaschinski (Maler)
- 2004: Isolde Ohlbaum (Fotografin; Ehrenpreis)
- 2005: Brigitta Rambeck (Malerin und Autorin)
- 2005: Renate Vogel (Schwabinger Podium)
- 2005: Ingwelde Schumacher (Buchhandlung Lehmkuhl; Ehrenpreis)
- 2006: Gabriella Lorenz (Journalistin)
- 2006: Marianne Schliwinski and Jürgen Eickhoff (Galerie Spektrum)
- 2006: Wolfgang Roucka (Galerist und Fotograf; Ehrenpreis)
- 2007: Klaus Lemke (Filmemacher)
- 2007: Jochen Schölch (Metropol-Theater)
- 2007: Joe Kienemann (Jazzmusiker und -journalist; Ehrenpreis)
- 2008: Christian Pfeil (Monopol-Kino)
- 2008: Gisela Schneeberger (actress)
- 2008: Christian Stückl (Theaterintendant und -regisseur; Ehrenpreis)
- 2009: Joachim Jung (Bildender Künstler)
- 2009: Klaus Kreuzeder (Saxophonist)
- 2009: Rotraut Susanne Berner (Grafikerin und Illustratorin; Ehrenpreis)
- 2010: Dominik Graf (Regisseur)
- 2010: Zé do Rock (Autor)
- 2010: Konstantin Wecker (Musiker; Ehrenpreis)

=== 2011 until now ===
- 2011: Till Hofmann (Veranstalter)
- 2011: Edmund Puchner (Bildhauer)
- 2011: Hans Daucher (Ehrenpreis)
- 2012: Richard Oehmann und Josef Parzefall (Doctor Döblingers geschmackvolles Kasperltheater)
- 2012: Stefan Winter (Musikverleger)
- 2012: Anatol Regnier (Gitarrist, Chansonnier und Schriftsteller; Ehrenpreis)
- 2013: Ilse Neubauer (Schauspielerin)
- 2013: Holger Paetz (Kabarettist)
- 2013: Sylvia Katzwinkel & Michael Wladarsch von 84 GHz – Raum für Gestaltung (als Veranstalter von Kunst im Karrée und Kultur im Keller)
- 2014: Roman Bunka (Musiker)
- 2014: Helmut Färber (Filmhistoriker)
- 2014: Cornelia von Seidlein (Grafikerin)
- 2014: Christian Ude (Ehrenpreis)
- 2015: Moses Wolff (Kabarettist, Musiker)
- 2015:Barbara Bronnen (Schriftstellerin)
- 2015: Salome Kammer (Sängerin, Schauspielerin)
- 2016: Klaus Backmund (Bildhauer)
- 2016: Eva Gesine Baur (Autorin)
- 2016: Jenny Evans (Jazzsängerin, Entertainerin und Schauspielerin)
- 2017: Thorsten Krohn (Schauspieler)
- 2017: Wolfgang Schlick mit der Express Brass Band (Musiker)
- 2017: Gunna Wendt (Schriftstellerin)
- 2018: Thomas Kuchenreuther (ABC Kino)
- 2018: Uli Oesterle (Literatur)
- 2018: Duo Tal & Groethuysen (Klavierduo)
- 2018: Walter Zöller (Ehrenpreis)
- 2019: Anita Albus (Malerin und Schriftstellerin)
- 2019: André Hartmann (Cabaret artist)
- 2019: Ingo Maurer (Lichtdesigner)
- 2020: Maria Peschek (Kabarettistin)
- 2020: Albrecht von Weech (Künstler)
- 2020: Ko Bylanzky und Rayl Patzak (Poetry-Slam Master)
- 2021: Elke Deuringer (Liedermacherin, Poetin, Sängerin und Pianistin)
- 2021: Johannes Hofbauer (Holzbildhauer)
- 2021: Julia von Miller (Sängerin und Komödiantin)
- 2022: Barbara von Johnson
- 2022: Kinderforum van de Loo
- 2022: Andrea Gronemeyer
- 2023: Fokus Tanz | Tanz und Schule e.V.
- 2023: Lydia Gastroph
- 2023: Ulrike Steinke
- 2024: Barbara Yelin, Hermine Bek-Anschütz und Louis Anschütz: Kino Studio im Isabella, MALVA
- 2025: Susanne Röckel, ausARTen, glitch Bookstore
- 2026: Franka Kaßner, Denijen Pauljević, Max Kersting

== See also ==
- List of European art awards
