= Clemensstraße =

Street in Munich, Germany

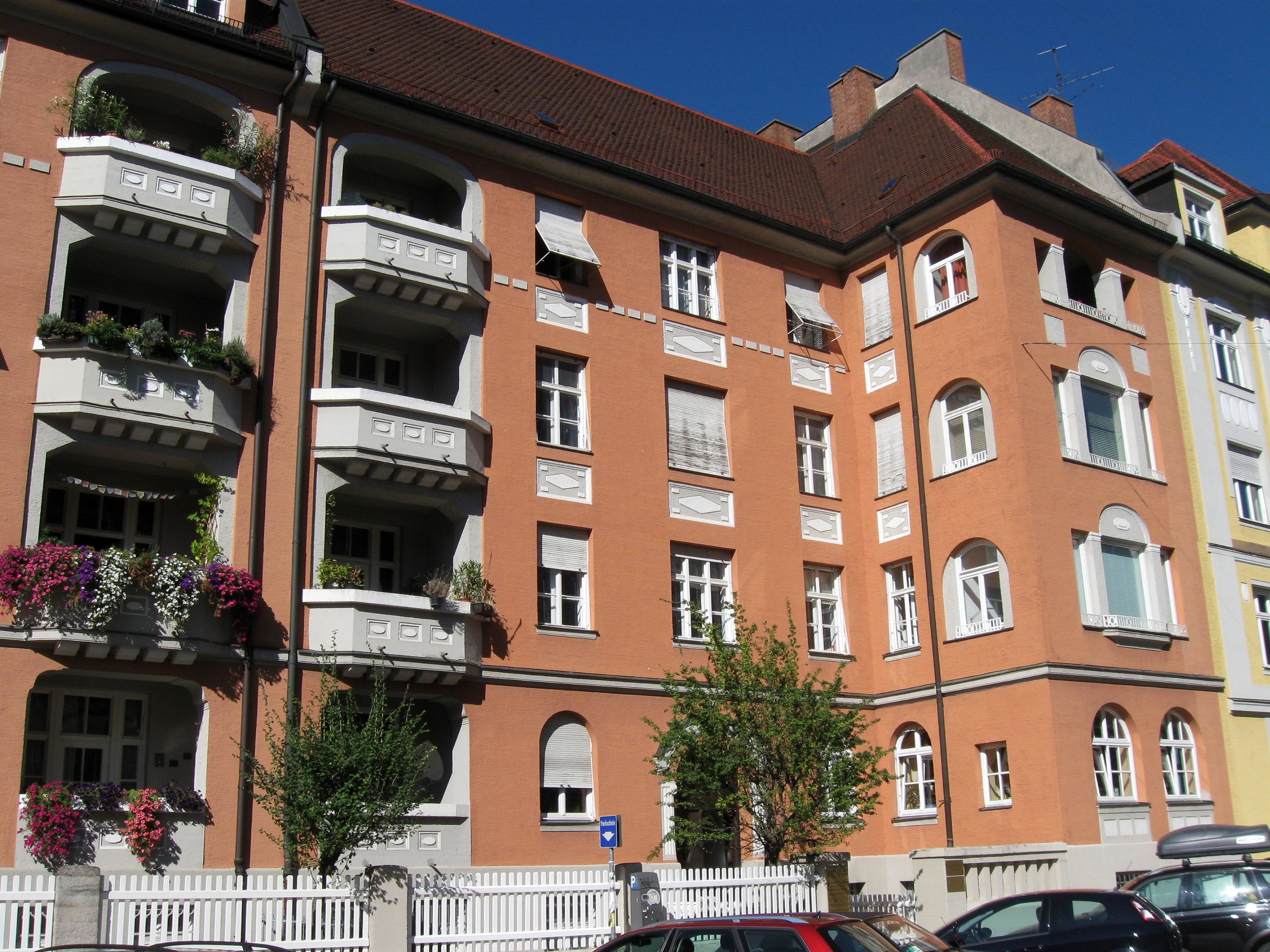
- Clemensstraße 32/34

- Location within Germany
- Namesake: Clemens August of Bavaria
- Length: 1,800 m (5,900 ft)
- Location: Munich
- Postal code: 80803
- Nearest metro station: Clemensstraße (Tram 27)
- Major junctions: Leopoldstraße, Morawitzkystraße, Siegfriedstraße, Wilhelmstraße, Bismarckstraße, Moltkestraße, Viktoriastraße, Cherubinistraße, Ansprengerstraße, Rossinistraße, Belgradstraße, Apianstraße, Fallmerayerstraße, Erich-Kästner-Straße, Mittermayrstraße, Hiltenspergerstraße, Schleißheimer Straße, Winzererstraße

Clemensstraße is a 1.76-kilometer-long street in Munich's Schwabing district. The street, named after Clemens August of Bavaria (1700–1761), labeled under the term Green Axis Schwabing is a participative model project for all Munich municipalities and Munich's longest bicycle road.

== Course ==
The Clemensstraße starts at Leopoldstraße, crosses Belgradstraße and Schleißheimer Straße and turns into Saarstraße at Winzererstraße. While in the area between Münchner Freiheit and Wilhelmstraße, relatively small shops line the street initially, Clemensstraße becomes predominantly a residential street. Until 2002, Clemensstraße 33 housed the Staatliche Fachakademie für Fotodesign München, which was founded on 15 October 1900, as the Lehr- und Versuchsanstalt für Photographie (teaching and research institution for photography). In the area of Belgradstraße, on both sides of the street are numerous restaurants to be found, especially in the summer months their free play areas shape the overall impression of the road. With several decades old traditions, such as the "X-Bar" as well as the, for example, from 1972 to 1976 by Heppel & Ettlich conducted "Jennerwein". Also located there, in Clemensstraße 61, was the "Clemensburg" as Munich's only BVB pub, which existed from 1907 to 2015. In the further course to the east, the Clemensstraße is again primarily a residential street. In the Clemensstraße 113/IV is the Säkularinstitut Ancillae Sanctae Ecclesiae. At the corner of Clemensstraße and Winzererstraße is the Landesarbeitsgericht München (Munich Labor Court).

== Historical buildings ==
In the area between Münchner Freiheit and Fallmerayerstraße, the Clemensstraße, with a length of around 1,100 m (3,600 ft), belongs to the historically protected construction ensemble Nordschwabing. Its design is mainly due to the expansion of the city after the incorporation of Schwabing in 1890 to Munich and the city expansion competition of 1892 under Theodor Fischer. Overall, the Clemensstraße has 36 historically protected monuments by the Bavarian State Office for the Preservation of monuments, of which 26 are in Schwabing-West and 10 in Schwabing.

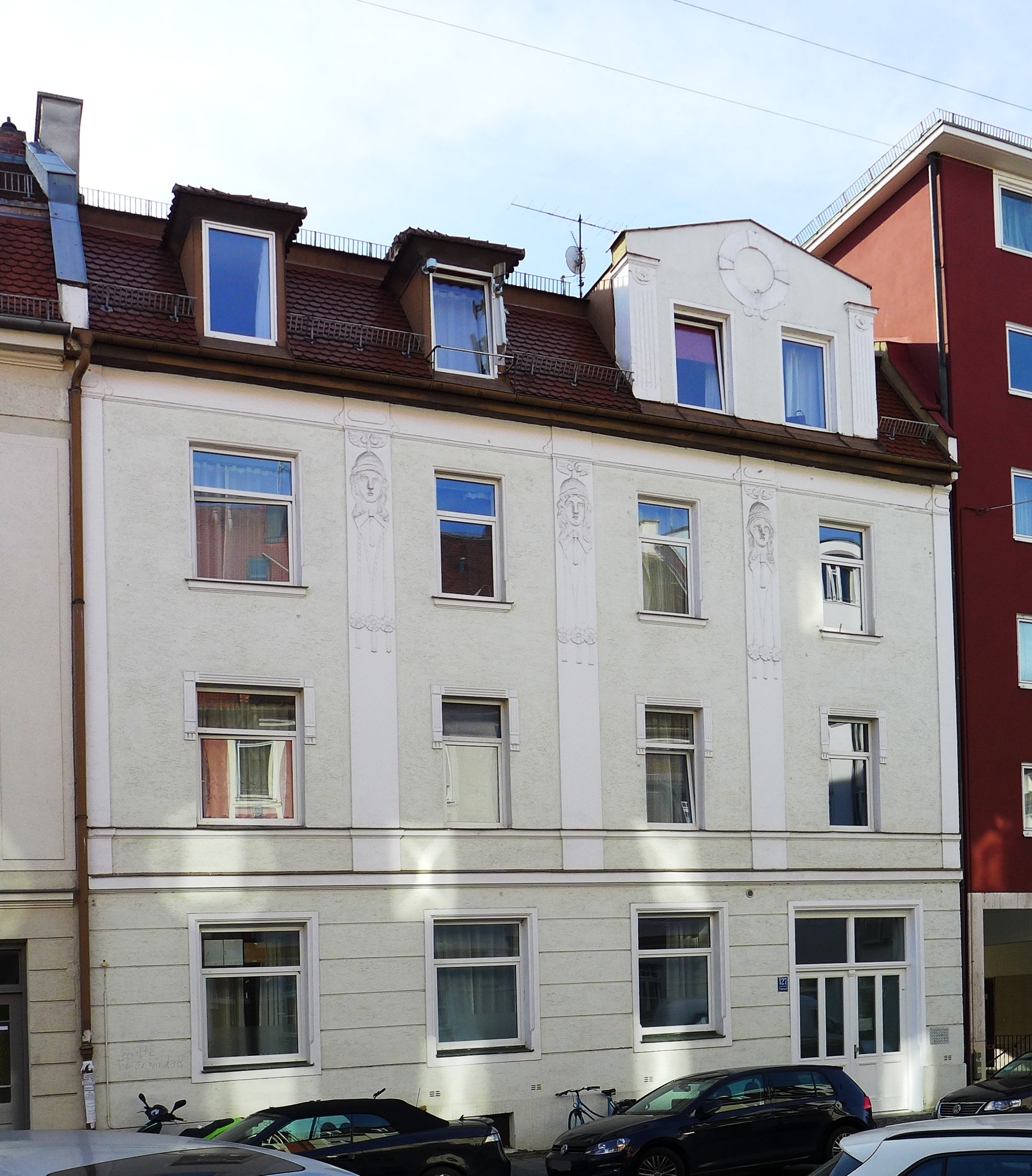
Dormitory built in 1903 by Andreas Aigner and Paul Breitsameter, Art Nouveau building at Clemensstraße 127

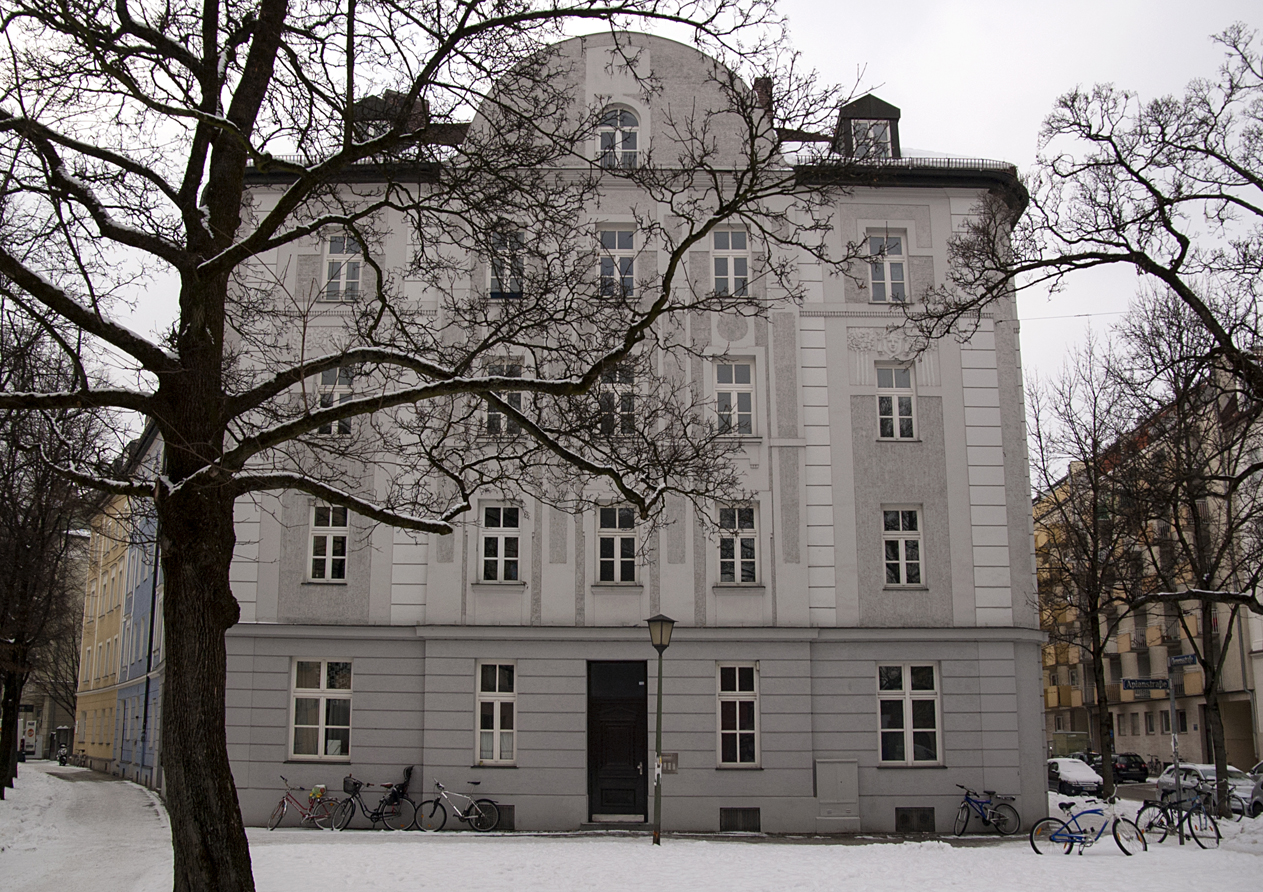
Built in 1900 by Gerhard Welzel, Baroque Art Nouveau corner building at Clemensstraße 71

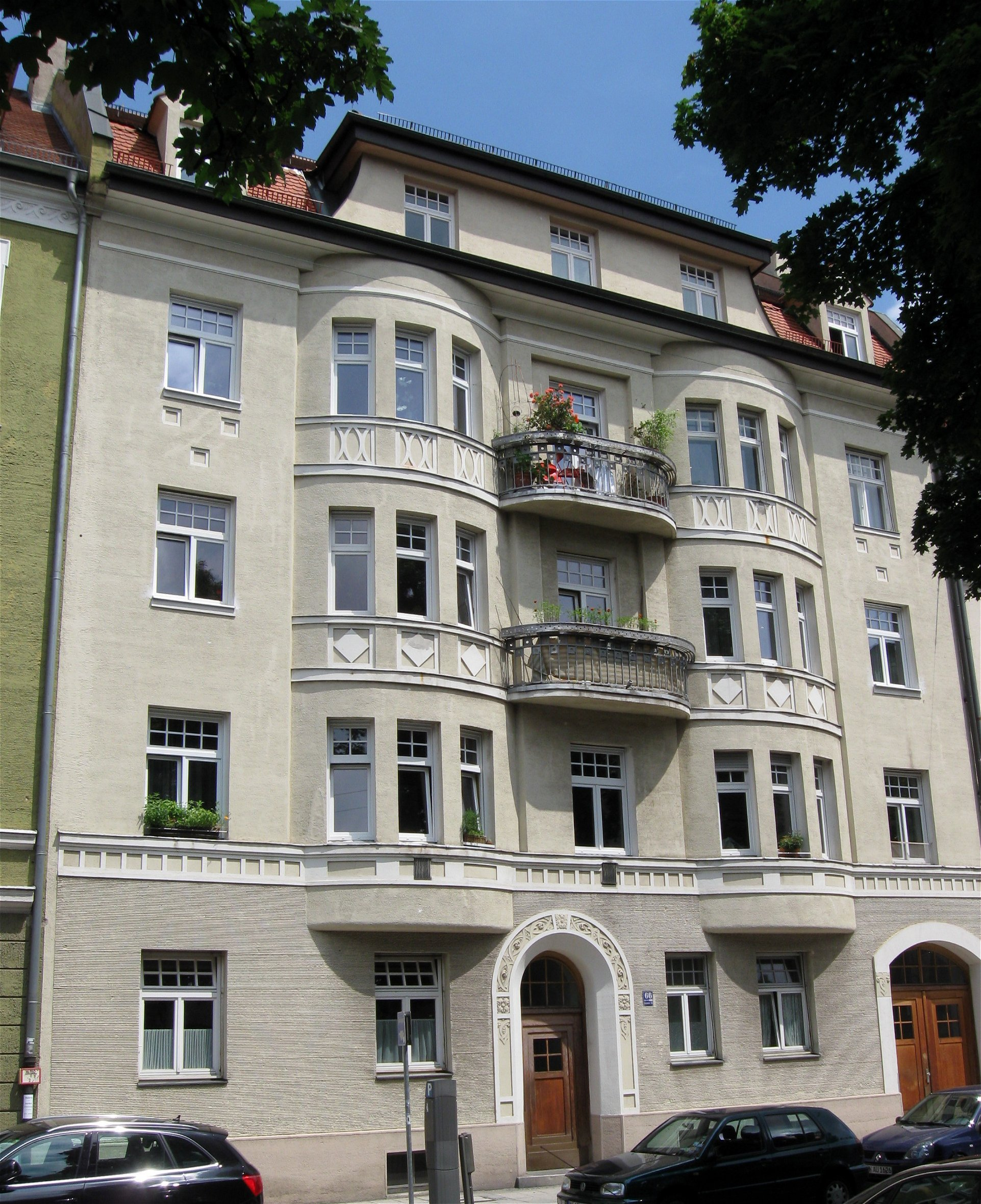
Early 20th century built Art Nouveau building with mansard roof at Clemensstraße 66

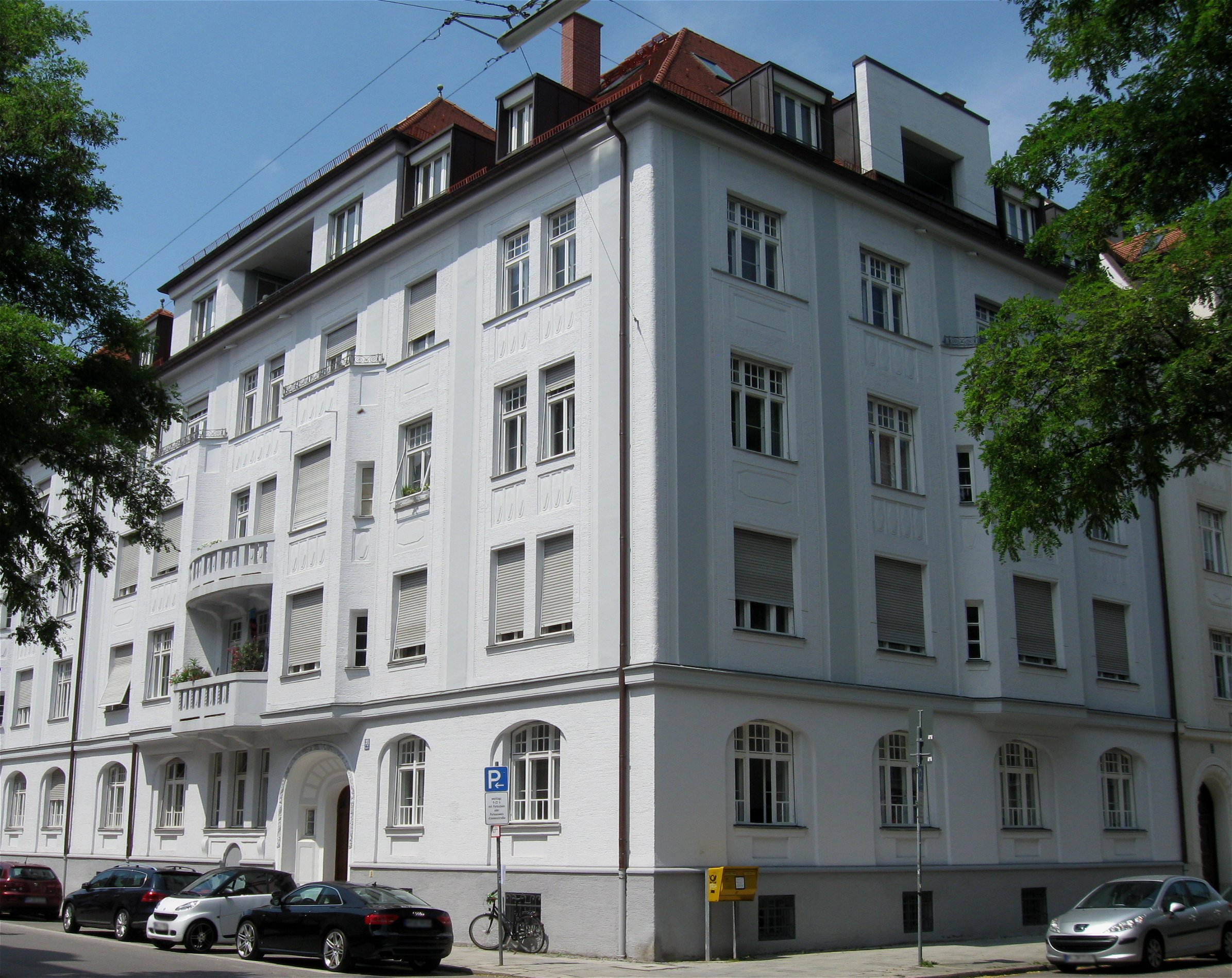
Early 20th century built corner building with bay windows and plaster decoration in forms of late Art Nouveau at Clemensstraße 38

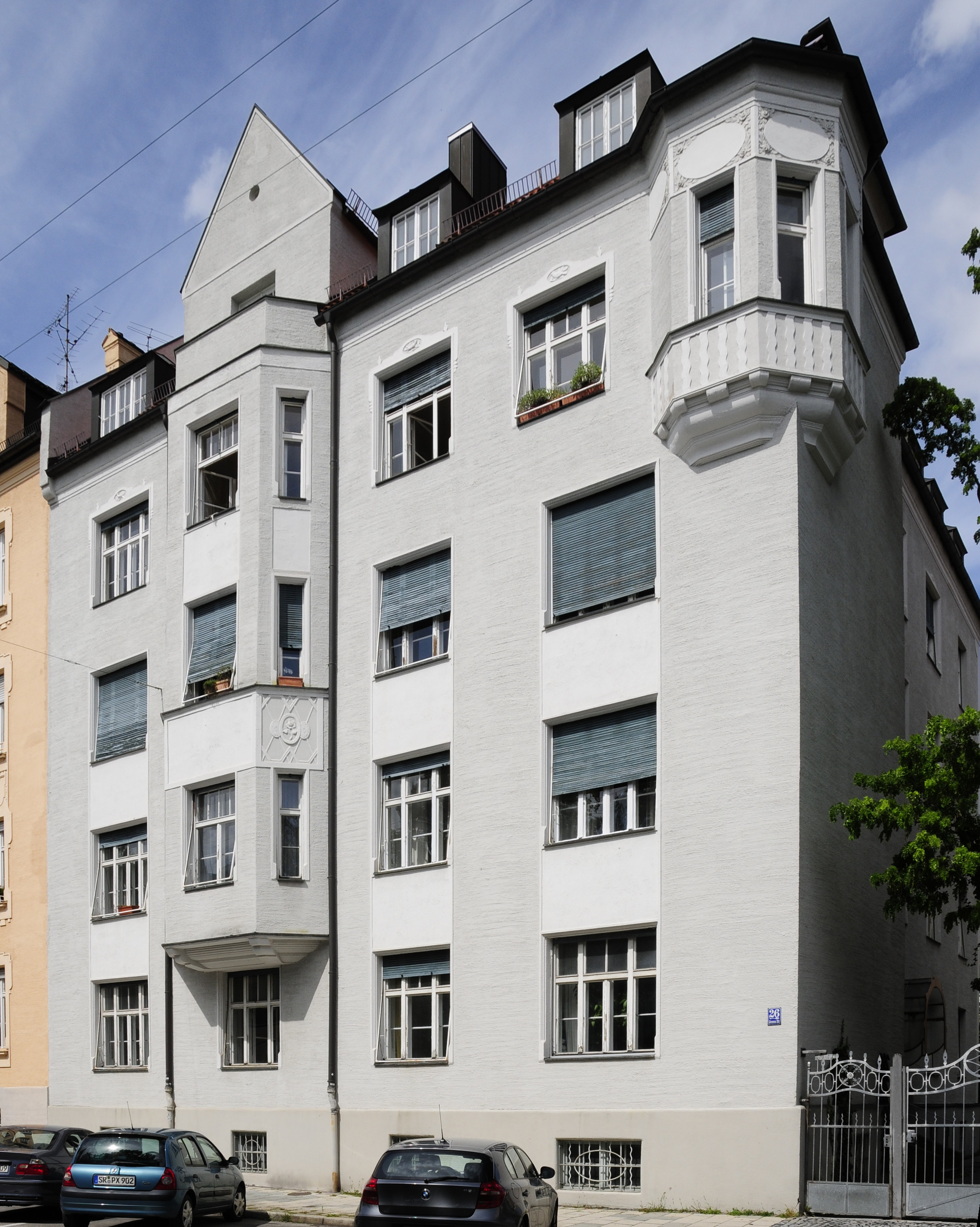
Baroque style Art Nouveau building built in the early 20th century at Clemensstraße 26

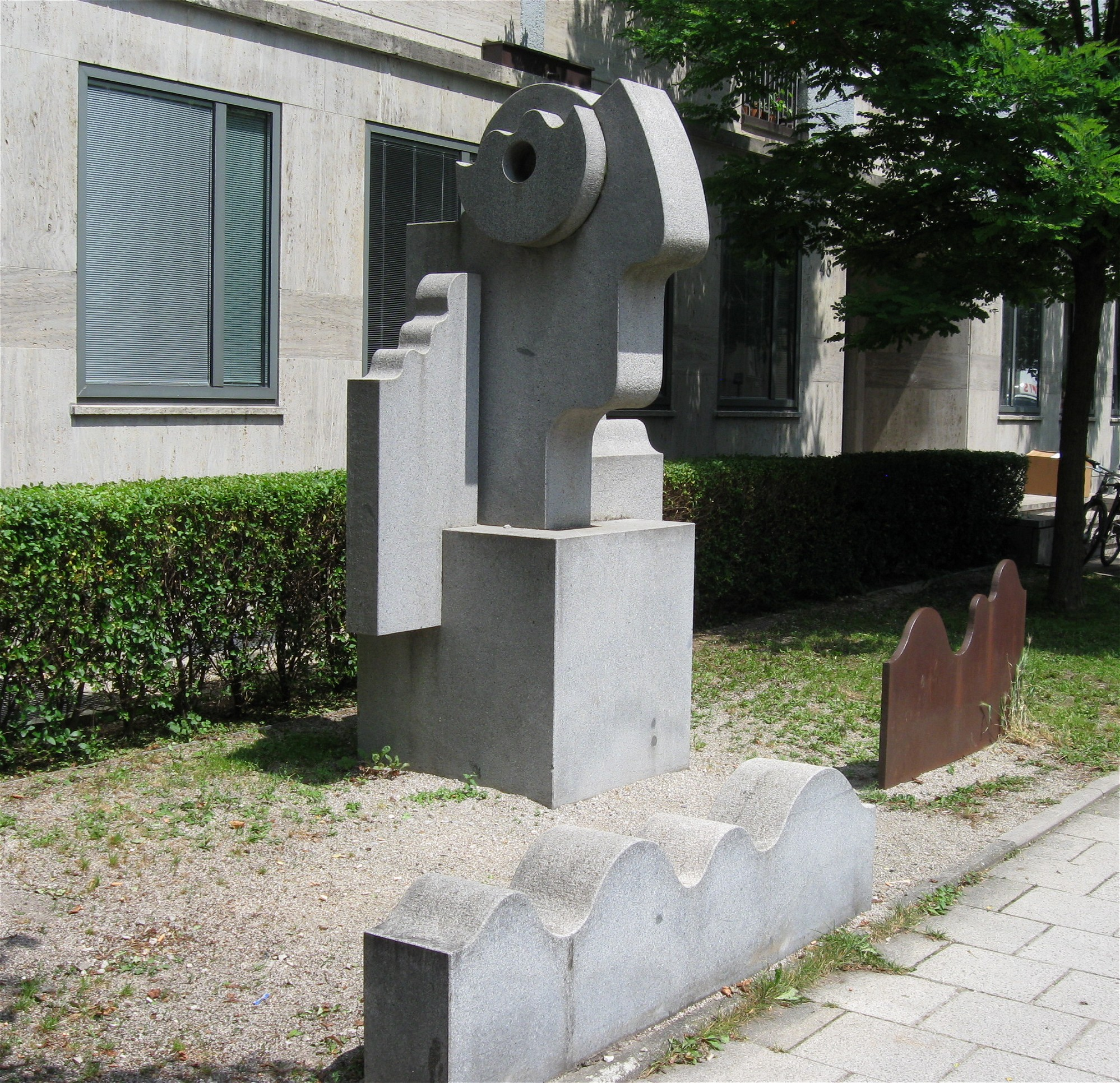
Sculpture by the sculptor Klaus Behr at Clemensstraße 48

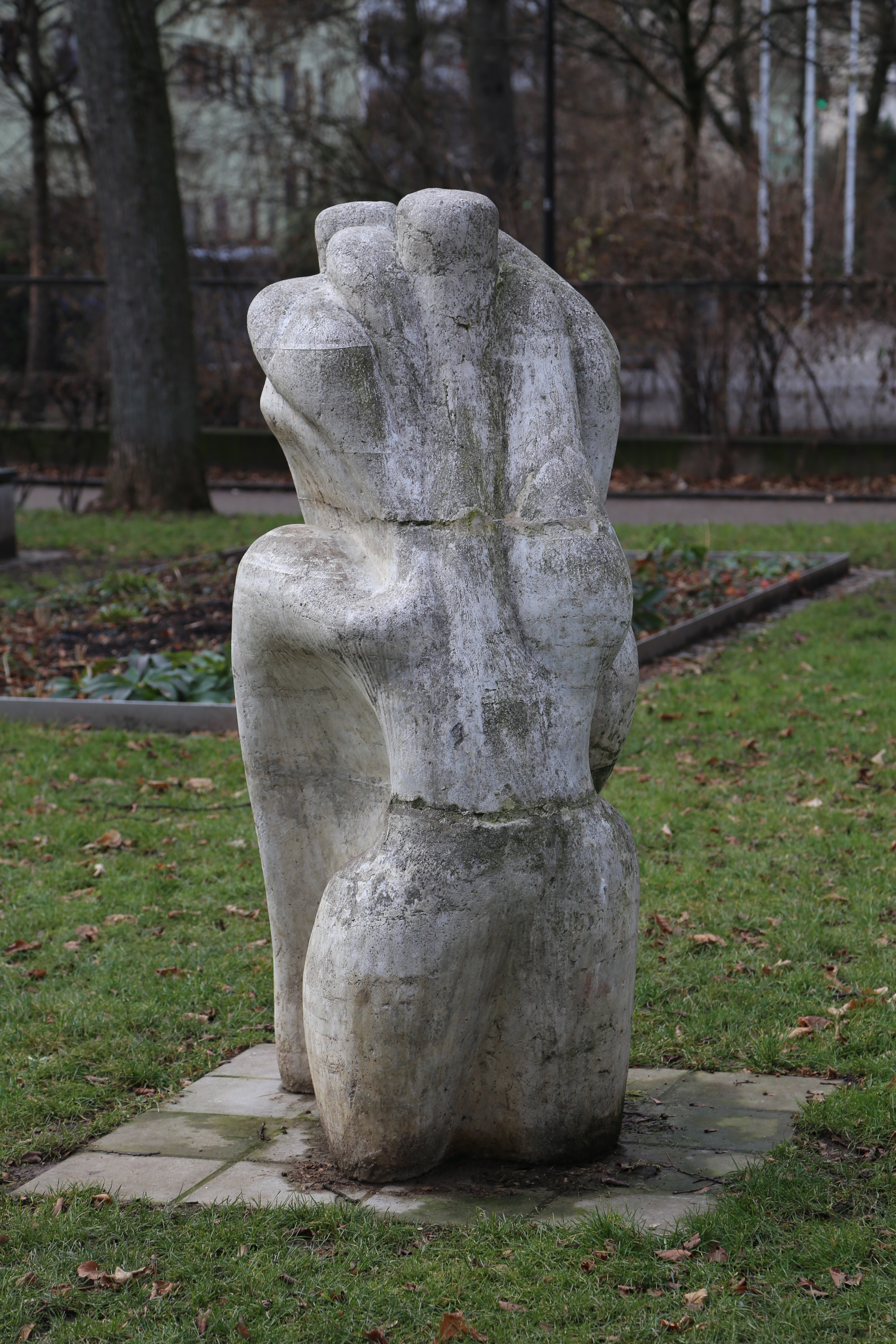
1979 by Undine Werdin created sculpture (Daphne) at the southern end of the Clemensstraße

== Famous residents ==
1884/85, the former Schwabing Hospital was built in Clemensstraße 33. In the spring of 1900, the stove and oven manufacturer Friedrich Wamsler, whose sons were among the founding members, gave FC Bayern Munich a fenced plot of land on Clemensstraße as a venue, until 1907 when he moved to Leopoldstraße and Parzivalplatz Here the first Munich City Derby also took place on 21 September 1902.

From 1906 to 1910, Alexander Roda Roda lived in Clemensstraße 2. From 1917 to 1919 Ret Marut lived in Clemensstraße 84 /III and led the editorship of Der Ziegelbrenner ("The Brick Burner") there.

From autumn 1967, Edgar Hilsenrath lived in the Clemensstraße 28. Rainer Werner Fassbinder and Juliane Lorenz lived in Clemensstraße 76, as well as Alexander Koester who lived on Clemensstraße (while his studio was on Leopoldstraße). Jochen Winter lived on Clemensstraße.
