= Elfriede Reichelt =

German woman photographer

Elfriede Klara Emma Reichelt (30 January 1883 – 22 August 1953) was a German fine-art photographer.

== Life ==
Elfriede Klara Emma Reichelt was born in Breslau, the second of three daughters of the merchant Oswald Reichelt and Emma Reichelt, née Streit. Her father ran a porcelain shop in the main shopping street of Breslau.

Reichelt was one of the first women to study from 1906 to 1908 at the Staatliche Fachakademie für Fotodesign München and was a student of the well-known German-American pictorialist Frank Eugene.

After her training, the photographer returned to her Silesian homeland to open a studio for artistic portrait photography in Wroclaw. Until the beginning of the 1930s, the professional photographer took portraits of both the national celebrities of the time as well as well-known personalities from Wroclaw, who often came from the circles of the academy and local collectors and aristocrats.

Landscape, still-life and nude photographs were also part of her range of motifs.

Reichelt was often allowed to portray Wilhelm II and his family in exile in the Netherlands in the 1920s. A large number of her portrait photos are inventoried in the Deutsche Fotothek. Among them, for example, one showing the ex-monarch with his little stepdaughter Henriette (1918-1972). It is entitled "Doorn. Kaiser Wilhelm II with Princess Henriette Schoenaich-Carolath in his arms". Another portrait photograph by Reichelt shows Henriette von Schönaich-Carolath with the family dog: "Princess Henriette von Schoenaich-Carolath with shepherd dog "Arno"". This was shown, among others, in Reichelt's exhibition at the Silesian Museum of Fine Arts in 1925 and published at the time in the Illustrated Weekly Supplement of the Silesian Zeitung.

She participated in important photo exhibitions of the era and published her pictures in renowned journals. The photographer was a member of the German Deutscher Werkbund and the Gesellschaft Deutscher Lichtbildner (GDL).

In 1927 she married the Ulm industrialist Hans Wieland and retired from active professional photography in the mid-1930s. After a few years in Ulm, Reichelt lived in Grünwald near Munich after separating from her husband in 1936.

She lived there in a spacious house with a housekeeper and gardener. During the war years, when her estate also suffered bomb damage, she took in her great-niece Dörte Schreiber there from 1941 to 1943. In her last years, Reichelt was ill with bladder cancer of which she died aged 70.
