= Staatliche Fachakademie für Fotodesign München =

German state tertiary photography academy

The Staatliche Fachakademie für Fotodesign München (The State Academy for Photo Design, Munich) was an independent training facility for photography and photo design in Munich with several predecessor institutions dating back to 1900. It was incorporated into the Munich University of Applied Sciences in 2002.

== History ==
Modelled on Vienna's Höhere Graphische Bundes-Lehr- und Versuchsanstalt the training facility was founded as an initiative of the South German Photographers Association ('Süddeutschen Photographen-Vereins') on October 15, 1900 in Rennbahnstrasse, near Munich's Theresienwiese, as the "Lehr- und Versuchsanstalt für Photographie” (“Teaching and Research Institute for Photography”), a Bavarian State Government Subsidised Educational Institution.

Munich became a cultural centre of Europe over the period of its establishment under the regency of Luitpold who during the Prinzregentenjahre ("The Prince Regent Years" or the Prinzregentenzeit) oversaw a flowering of artistic and cultural activity in Bavaria which prospered under a liberal government and which attracted creative artists in all fields from across Europe. Thomas Mann in his novella about this period Gladius Dei, exclaimed that "München leuchtete" (literally; "Munich shone").

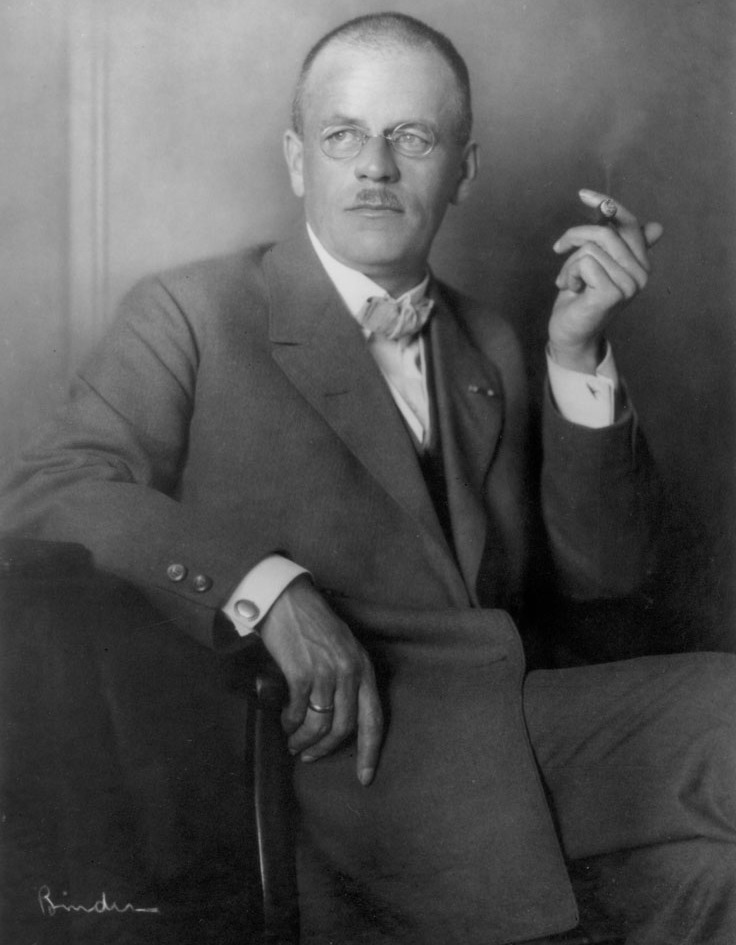
Georg Heinrich Emmerich

The founder was photographic supplies dealer Georg Heinrich Emmerich (1870–1923), a keen advocate for, and amateur exhibitor of, pictorialism, and frequent contributor to photography magazines, including Allgemeine Photographen-Zeitung. Zeitschrift für Künstlerische Fach-Photographie ('German Photography Magazine: Journal for Artistic Photography) from 1892, and author of photography books from 1904. In the May 1899 edition of the Allgemeine Photographen-Zeitung, Emmerich in his article 'Photographische Lehranstalten' ('Photographic Schools') he deplored the state of existing training for German professional photographers and agitated for the establishment of a photographic educational institution in Munich.

He became its first director until 1919. He announced his intention that the school should offer;

"not mechanically learned soulless technique that left the stamp of artistic insignificance on the earlier products of professional photography, but rather expressing the individual capture of characteristic moments and one's own feelings in photographic works, recognising these principles that are indispensable for artistic creation in every single student: that is the task that the management primarily strives to carry out.”

The curriculum was broad, and included not only “practical photography with negative and positive processes”, retouching and reproduction technology, but also drawing, compositional theory, vignette painting, physics, art and photography history, alongside commercial bookkeeping.

Emmerich's son Walter E. Lautenbacher studied at the college from 1947 to 1949 and founded the Bund Freischaffender Fotodesigner (BFF) ('Association of Freelance Photo Designers') in 1969.

In 1904 the institution was expanded with a graphic arts department and renamed the "Teaching and Research Institute for Photography, Chemography, collotype and engraving".

== Education of women photographers ==
Despite Munich's more enlightened attitudes to women as intellectual beings in organisations like the Gesellschaft zur Förderung der geistigen Interessen der Frau ("Society for the Promotion of the Intellectual Interests of Women"), women struggled for access to creditable art and photography education, with the exception of private ladies 'academies of the arts', such as the Debschitz School. The Munich Academy of Fine Arts would not enrol women until 1917; Zofia Stryjeńska from Poland defied the ban by disguising herself as her brother to study for a year before her deception was revealed and she was expelled from the Academy.

At its establishment only male candidates were initially admitted to study at the photography Institute. In a progressive policy, by 1905 Emmerich was accepting women into its courses. Wanda von Debschitz-Kunowski and Sophie Reynier were among the intake of 1905/1906, and Elfriede Reichelt, Charlotte Poehlmann and Amalie Schroer in the following year. Due to the objections of women students to the spartan dormitory conditions, in 1909 the school moved to a former hospital building to which it was given free occupation, opening it in May, 1911. Enrolments from both genders were subject to quotas, so that only ten female students were allowed to be admitted per semester, increasing to a 1:3 ratio. During the war years it rose to a 3:2 majority of female students, settling to a more balanced ratio in the 1920s; in 1925 when Lotte Jacobi enrolled, half of the 51 students enrolling were women, and 80% were from non-German speaking countries.

Admission required an elementary school certificate (though during the war that was flexible; Germaine Krull's lack of a school certificate was overlooked), and men had to be at least 15, and women at least 17 years old, and all had to meet the annual school fee of about 200 Reichsmarks (value $US2,000 in 2020) which middle-class parents might afford while even the well-off blue-collar family might not.

Professor Hans Spörl, an author of photography books for amateurs as well as on advanced technique and materials, succeeded Emmerich in 1919 and Professor W. Urban taught photochemistry.

== Pictorialism ==
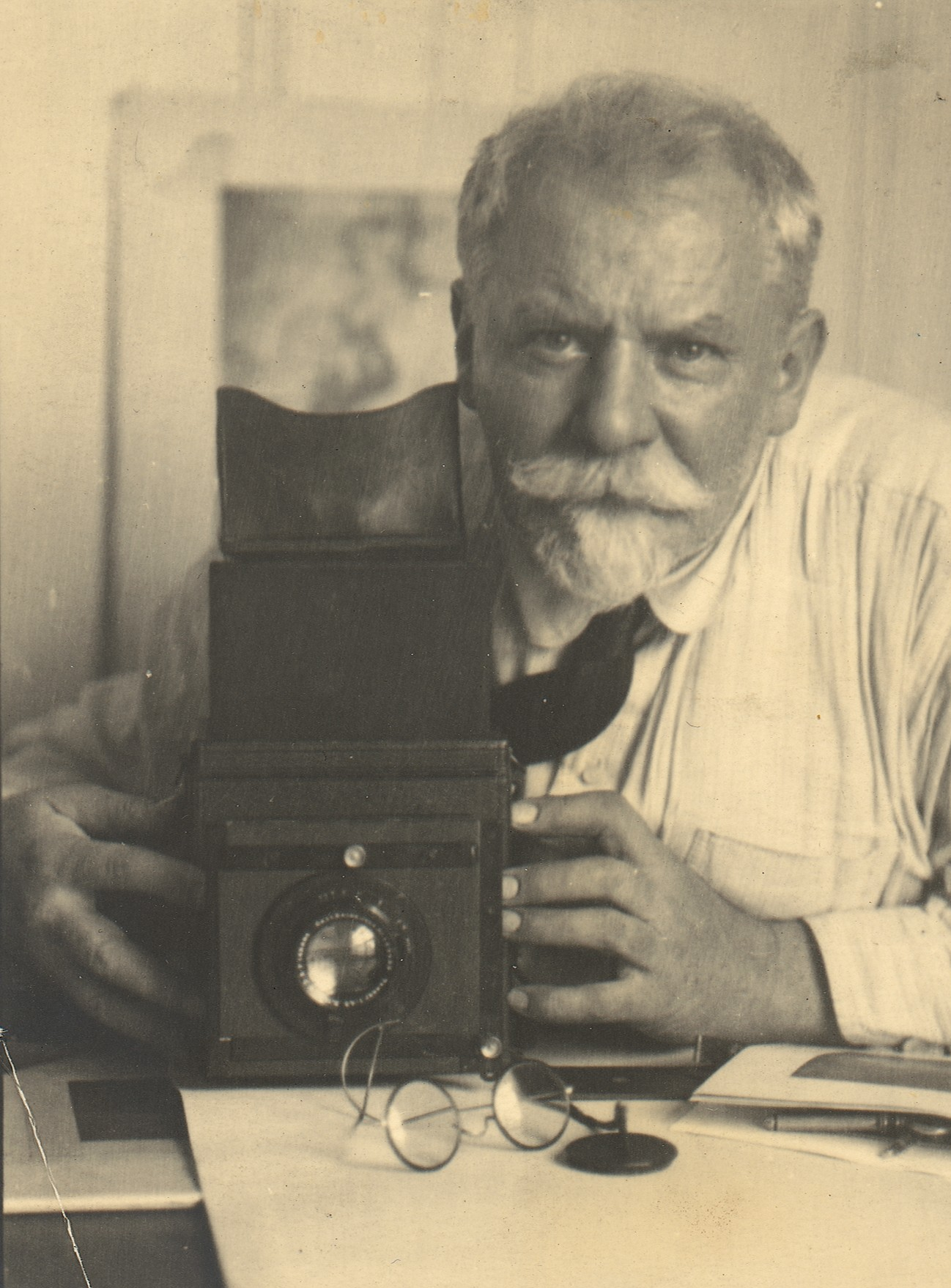
Frank Eugene

Though it incorporated physics and chemistry classes in teaching photography as a science as espoused by Hermann Krone and Josef Maria Eder, the institution promoted art photography over the practical orientation of the Lette-Verein, Berlin. In 1907 Emmerich appointed another Pictorialist, the renowned American-born Frank Eugene, member of The Linked Ring and founder of the Photo-Secession, as a lecturer in 'Artistic Photography' until 1913, who during his tenure and with Alfred Stieglitz who visited him in 1907, experimented with colour autochromes.

== Photo Design ==
After WW1 the government took over the school on 1 July 1921 and a department was added for the teaching of motion picture technique under Professor Konrad Wolter. By 1924, facilities for photoengraving and collotype were no longer being financially supported by photoengravers and lithographers of Munich and discontinued, the rooms being taken over by the motion picture department. In 1928 the institution was nationalised as the Bayerische Staatslehranstalt für Lichtbildwesen ('Bavarian Government Institute for Photographic Procedure'), a title that foregrounds 'scientific' photography.

The connection between the institution's post-WW2 design emphasis and fotoform, an avant-garde movement that promoted formalism in the service of a subjective and purely artistic, non-applied intent, is apparent. Peter Keetman attended the Bayerische Staatslehranstalt für Lichtbildwesen over 1935 to 1937, then from 1947 to 1948 he attended its master class taught by Adolf Lazi, and that year assisted Lazi with the first post-war photography exhibition Die Photographie in the Landesgewerbemuseum, Stuttgart. In 1949 Keetman was a founding member of fotoform and his were key works in the exhibition Subjective Photography put together by Otto Steinert in 1951 with an accompanying photo book. Wolfgang Reisewitz, also a founding member, studied at the institution contemporaneously with Keetman, during 1947-8.

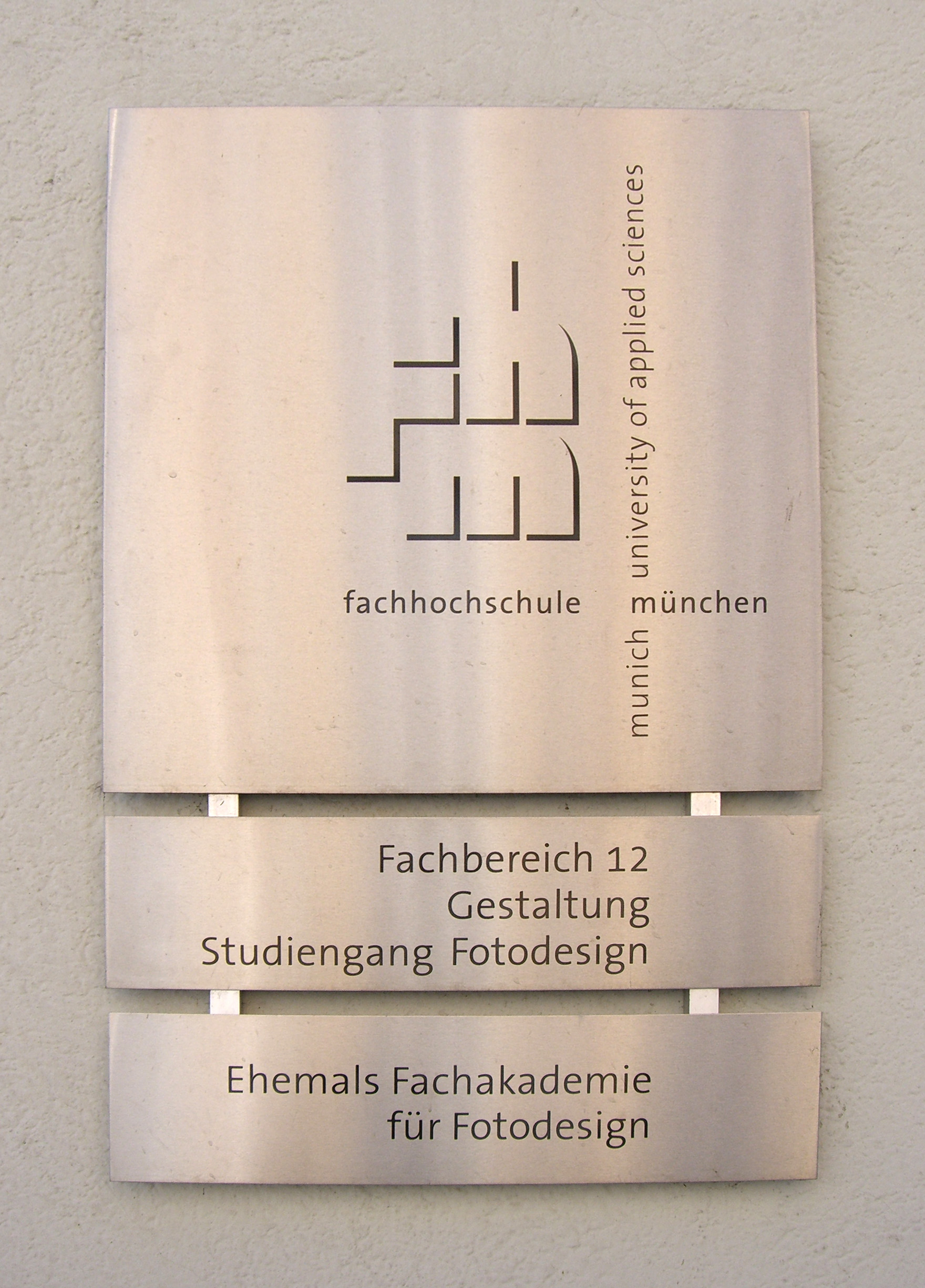
Fachakademie für Fotodesign entrance sign

From 1954 the school became the Bayerische Staatslehranstalt für Photographie ("Bavarian State Institute for Photography") before, in 1990, the name was again changed, to Staatliche Fachakademie für Fotodesign (“State Academy for Photo Design”).

== Subsumption as a course in Munich University of Applied Sciences ==
In 2002, the specialist academy was incorporated as a "Photo Design" course into Faculty 12 "Design" at the Munich University of Applied Sciences (FHM) and two years later the last 30 graduates emerged from Clemensstrasse 33.

"Photo design" is now a course of study in the Faculty of Design at the Munich University of Applied Sciences, which since 2019 has been based in the historic aristocratic armory at Lothstrasse 17. It continues to provide media education with an emphasis on creativity.

== Notable graduates and associates ==
- G. H. Emmerich (1900–1917), founder and director
- Wanda von Debschitz-Kunowski (1900–1902)
- František Drtikol (1901–1903)
- Elfriede Reichelt (1906 - 1908)
- Frank Eugene (1907–1913)
- Alexander Binder (1908-1910)
- Germaine Krull (1915-1917)
- Wilhelm Castelli (1921-1923)
- Lotte Jacobi (1925-1927)
- Huss Flöter, 1928.
- Johannes Felbermeyer (1926–1928)
- Hedda Morrison (1929-1990)
- Willy Zielke (lecturer)
- Dieter Hinrichs (teacher)
- Use Schneider-Lengyel
- Otti Zacharias (1930–1931)
- Helmut Gernsheim (1934–1936)
- Wolfgang Reisewitz (1948–1949)
- Peter Keetman (1935–1937 & 1947 -?)
- Walter E. Lautenbacher (1947–1949)
- Floris Michael Neusüss (1958–1960)
- Christoph von Wangenheim (1962–1964)
- Etienne C.I. van Sloun (1964–1966)
- William D. Sutherland (1982-1983) Meisterklasse -
- Petra Gerschner (1982–1984)
- Juergen Teller (1984–1986)
- Martin Fengel (1986–1988)
- Jörg Koopmann (1990–1993)
- Thomas Dreier (1994-1999)

== Bibliography ==
- Jahrbuch der Lehr- und Versuchsanstalt für Photographie, Chemigraphie, Lichtdruck und Gravüre zu München., 1907–1916 / RHK 04394; BSBM Sign. 4 Bav. 1010u (je 900 Aufl.)
- Pohlmann, Ulrich; Scheutle, Rudolf; Münchner Stadtmuseum. Fotomuseum (2000), Lehrjahre, Lichtjahre : die Münchner Fotoschule 1900-2000, Schirmer/Mosel, ISBN 978-3-88814-943-6
