= Jörg Koopmann =

German photographer

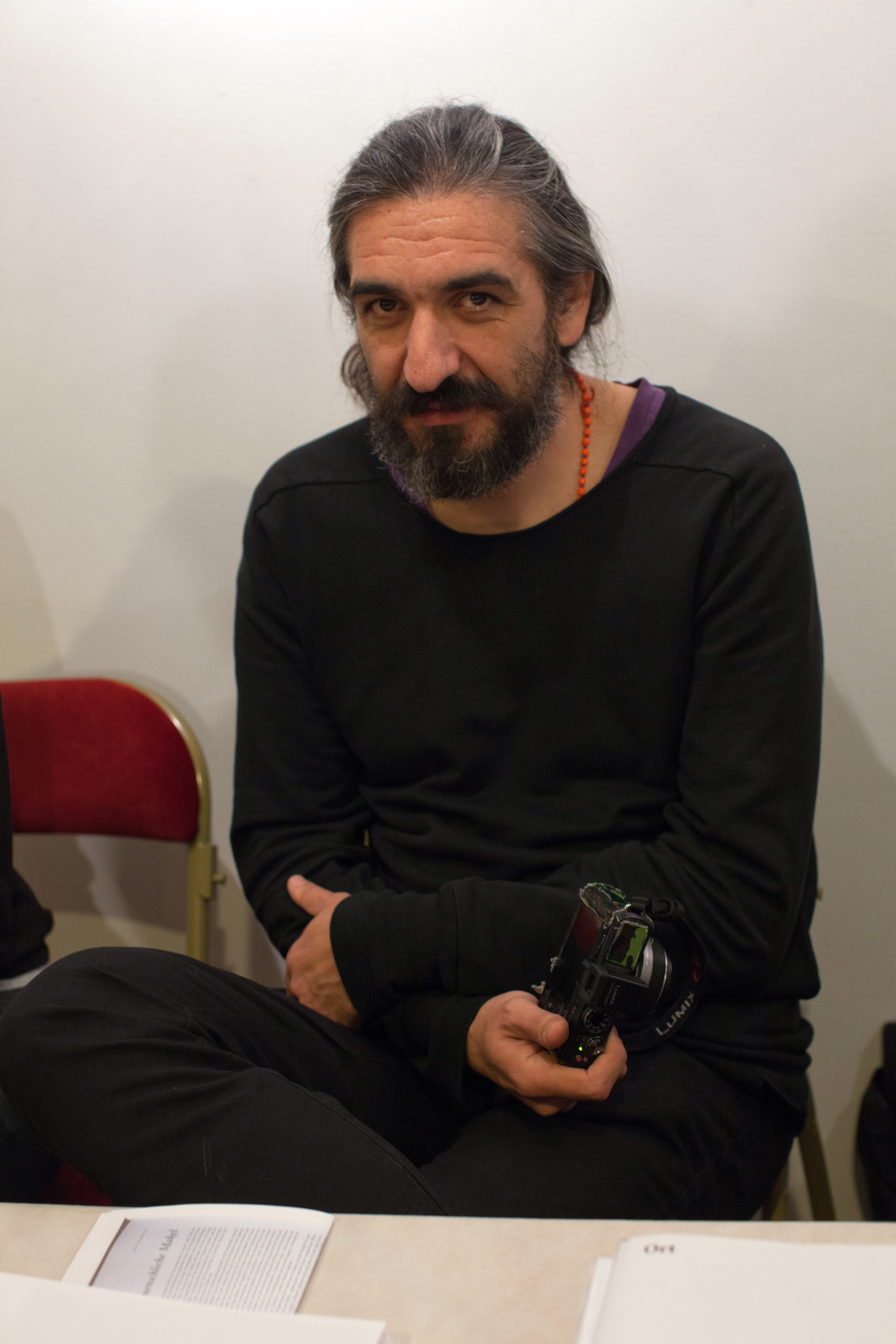
- Jörg Koopmann, 2010
- Born: 10 March 1968 (age 58); Munich, Germany
- Education: State Academy of Photographic Design, Munich
- Known for: photographer; especially photojournalism, portrait photography, travel photography, fine art photography

Jörg Koopmann (born 10 March 1968 in Munich, Germany) is a German photographer.

== Biography ==
Koopmann studied photography at the State Academy of Photographic Design in Munich and graduated in 1993. He wrote his diploma thesis about "photojournalism" at professor Dieter Hinrichs. Afterwards he was working as photographer of the municipal gallery at the Lenbachhaus in Munich from 1994 until 1996. Since 1997 he is working predominantly free-lanced, first and foremost in the branches of photojournalism and portrait photography.

Also in 1997 he founded with Marek Vogel the photography forum "glossy" in Munich, that he is still running together with Martin Fengel.

== Works ==
The main focus of his works is on photojournalism and travel photography. In addition to a lot of fine art photographs and works for print media, Koopmann got popular by his works in magazines like the ZEIT-Magazine of Die Zeit, the SZ-Magazine of the Süddeutsche Zeitung, the Swiss Tages-Anzeiger, Wallpaper+Line (London), Spex and others.

Furthermore, he took part at many national and international exhibitions. He does not describe his works but lets them sink in. In this regard he does not make any differences between own or remittance works.

== Awards ==
In 1999 he took part at the "Körber photography award" contest and in the same year he was nominated for the photography award of the city of Munich, the capital of the Free State of Bavaria, but he just got it in 2001.
