= Karl Hoff =

German painter (1838–1890)

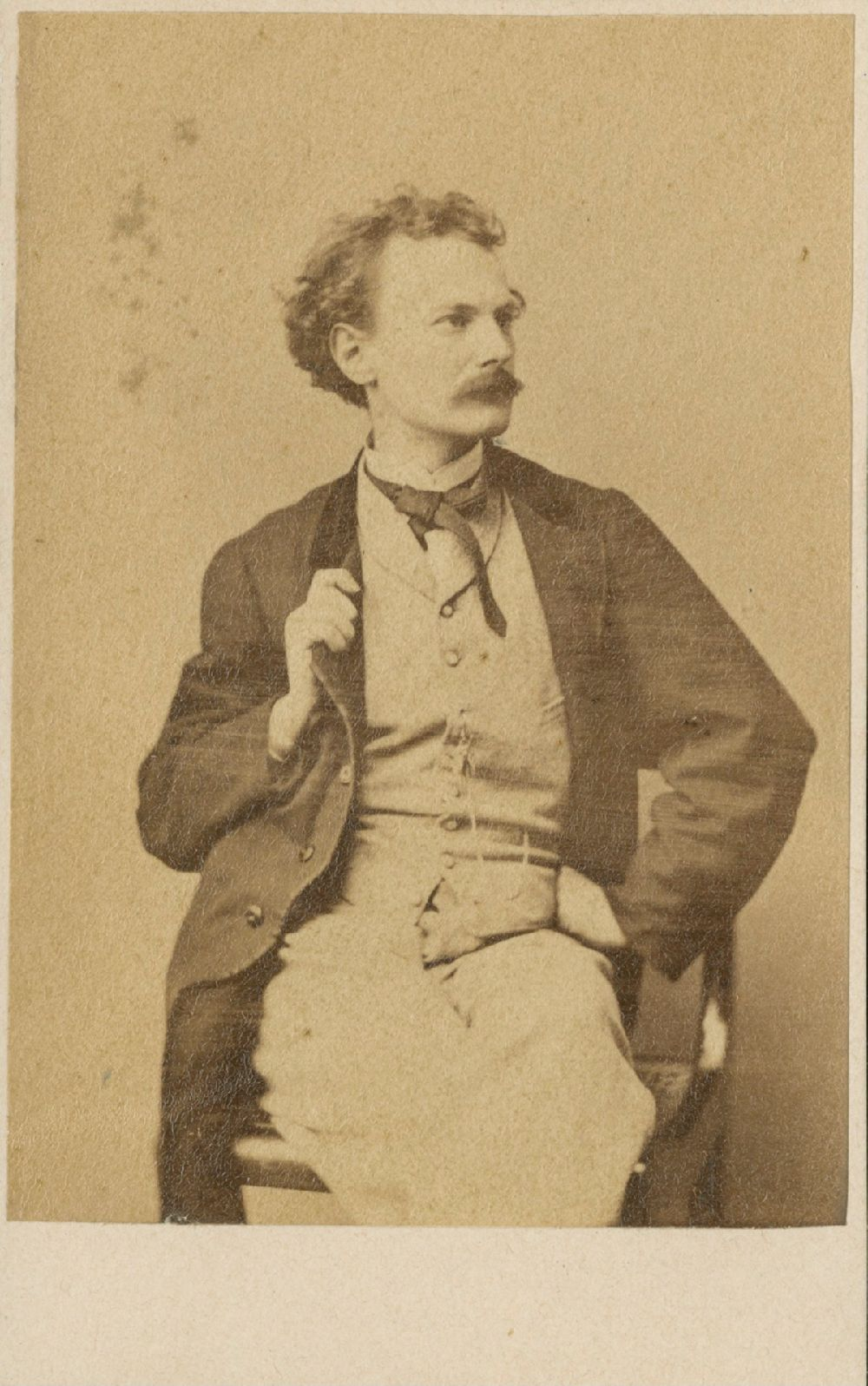
Karl Hoff by G. & A. Overbeck (firm), c. 1868

Karl Heinrich Hoff (8 September 1838 – 13 May 1890) was a German genre painter, best known for his 18th century period scenes. He is generally referred to as The Elder, to distinguish him from his son, Karl Heinrich, who was also a painter.

== Biography ==
He was born in Mannheim. His father, Carl (1804–1891), was a confectioner. From 1855 to 1858, he studied at the Academy of Fine Arts, Karlsruhe, with Johann Wilhelm Schirmer and Ludwig des Coudres. In 1858, developed an interest in the Düsseldorf school of painting and went there to continue his studies with Benjamin Vautier. After an extended series of study trips through France, Italy, Greece and Eastern Europe, he set up his own business in Düsseldorf, where he produced his first series of genre paintings. During this time, he married Marie Sohn (1841–1893), daughter of the painter Karl Ferdinand Sohn. They had two sons.

He was an active member of the Malkasten, a progressive artists' association and, from 1870 to 1872, served as President of the Allgemeinen Vereins der Karnevalsfreunde zu Düsseldorf, the organization that planned the annual carnival. In 1874, he became involved with a private group planning the proposed Zoologischer Garten Düsseldorf, which opened in 1876, and the animal welfare society "Fauna", which was seeking to ensure that the park was properly cared for.

He was also a poet. In 1877, he composed tableaux vivants for the "Kaiserfest", honoring Kaiser Wilhelm I on the occasion of his visit there. The following year, he wrote a comic epic called Schein (appearance), billed as a "sketchbook in verse".

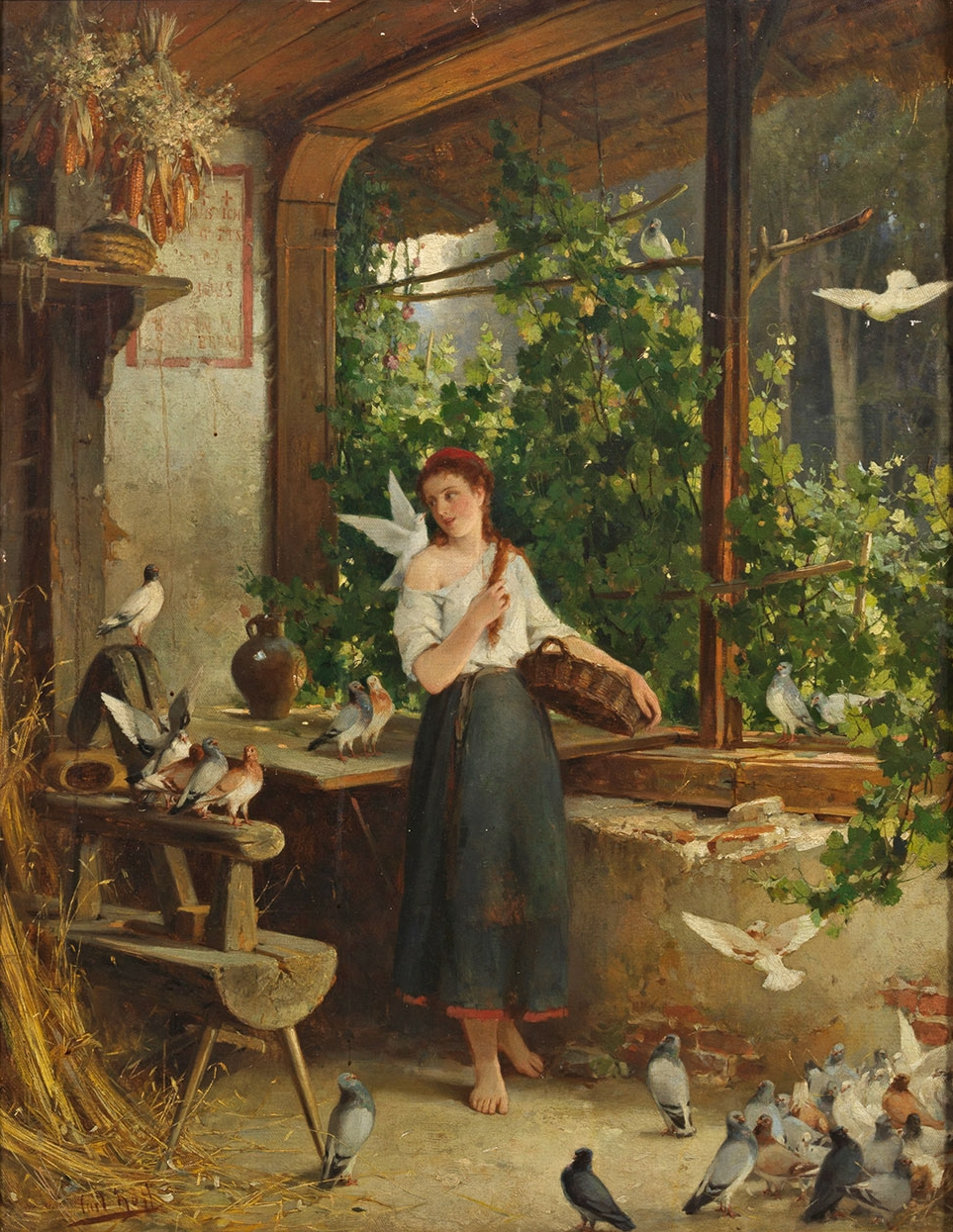
Cinderella with the Doves

In 1878, he was appointed a Professor at the Karlsruhe Academy, succeeding Wilhelm Riefstahl, who had moved to Munich. His pupils there included Alexander Koester and Julius Fehr. In 1882, he issued Artists and Art Writers, a controversial brochure containing violent attacks against art critics and criticism in general. In 1886, he made use of his experience with the carnival in Düsseldorf to help organize a large historical pageant, celebrating the 500th anniversary of the University of Heidelberg.

He suffered from tuberculosis and died in Karlsruhe in 1890, aged only fifty-one, following a brief illness.
