= Hans Dieter Beck =

German publisher (1932–2025)

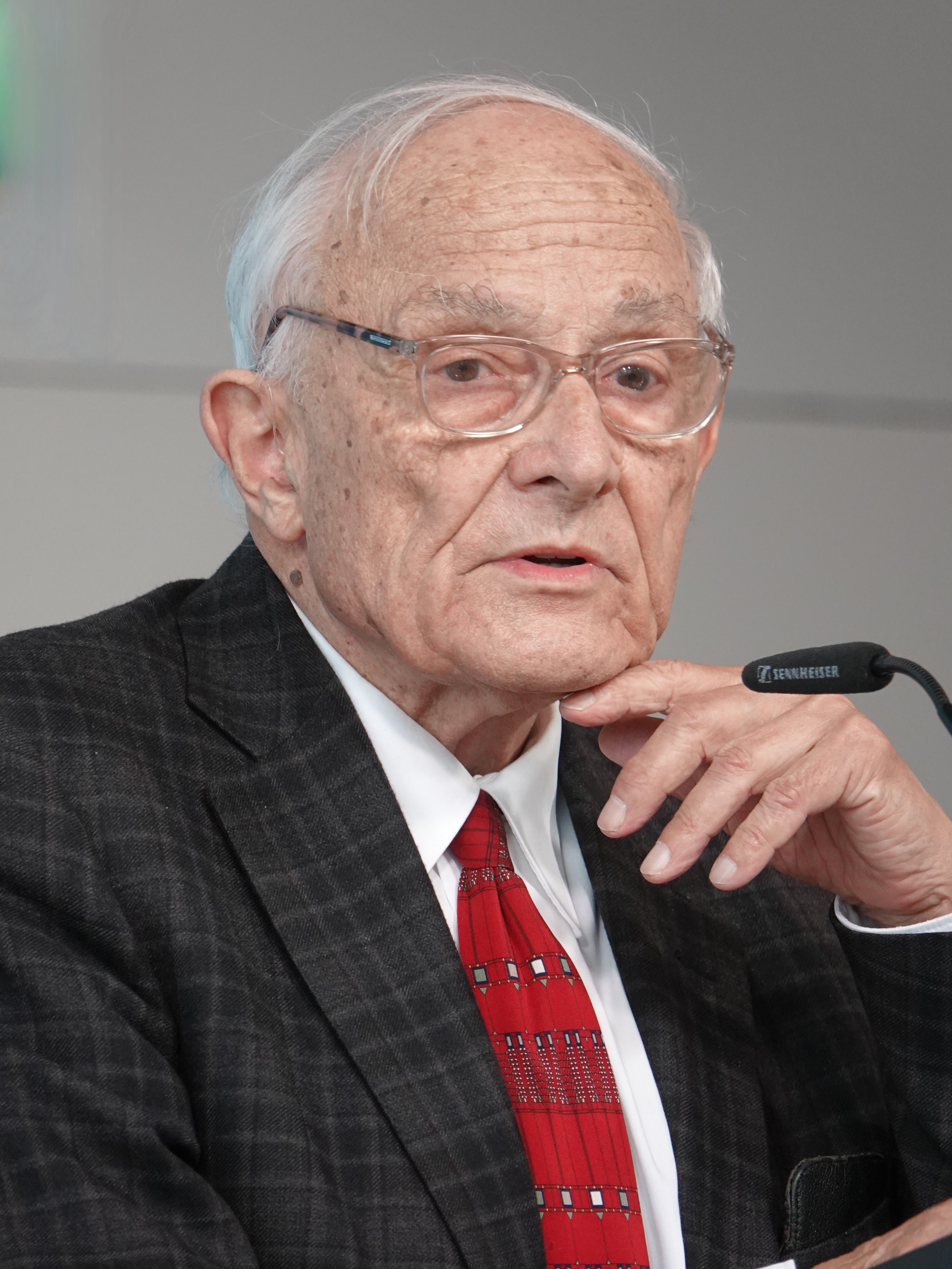
- Beck in 2022
- Born: 9 April 1932; Munich, Germany
- Died: 3 January 2025 (aged 92); Munich, Germany
- Education: Ludwig-Maximilians-Universität München (PhD)
- Occupations: Publisher; Jurist
- Organizations: C. H. Beck

Hans Dieter Beck (9 April 1932 – 3 January 2025) was a German publisher. He was one of the two partners heading the C. H. Beck publishing group in the sixth generation, and responsible for the company's legal, tax, and economics publishing program.

== Life and career ==
Beck was born in Munich on 9 April 1932, as the son of the publisher Heinrich Beck and his wife Eva. He first studied mathematics and physics, then German and psychology, before turning to law studies. From January 1961, he worked "as a kind of legal editor" in the family-owned publishing house C. H. Beck, founded by Carl Gottlob Beck in 1763. He obtained his doctorate in law with a dissertation on licensing agreements in publishing at the Ludwig-Maximilians-Universität München the same year. After four years of working in the publishing house and an extended stay in the United States, including at Harvard Business School and as a trainee in an American publishing house, he gained experience in the judicial service as a court assessor and later as a judge at the Munich I Regional Court.

At the end of 1970, he returned to the publishing house to take over the legal and economic departments and at the same time the management of the printing works in Nördlingen. From 1971, he headed the legal publishing branch. He led the publishing house together with his brother Wolfgang Beck who was responsible for the fiction and non-fiction divisions; they were the sixth generation of management of the family business, in direct succession of the company founder. In 2015, Wolfgang Beck was replaced by his son Jonathan Beck. Hans Dieter Beck expanded the position of C. H. Beck as a leading publisher of legal literature in German, adding legal commentaries and trade papers.

In other roles, Beck was chairman of the Bavarian regional association of the Börsenverein des Deutschen Buchhandels from 1979 to 1982 and a board member of the Association of Legal and Political Science Publishers. After the end of the Cold War, Beck also became involved in the former Eastern Bloc. He was very successful in Poland, but failed in Russia. The Russian management tried to expropriate the German parent company, and the Russian state demanded high fines for alleged irregularities in accounting. Although Beck won the court cases, he withdrew from business in Russia in 1999.

== Personal life ==
Beck was married; the couple had three daughters. He was an experienced mountain climber. He usually rode to work by bicycle, the last time on 23 December 2024. Beck died in Munich on 3 January 2025, at the age of 92.

== Awards ==
In 1989, Beck was awarded the Officer's Cross of the Order of Merit of the Federal Republic of Germany, in 1992 the München leuchtet medal, in 1993 the honorary award of the Schwabing Art Prize, in 2002 the honorary citizenship of the city of Nördlingen, and in 2012 the Bavarian Order of Merit.
