= Alexander Koester =

German painter

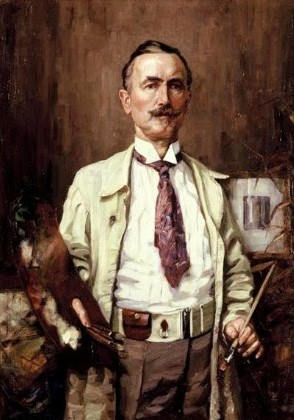
Self-portrait (date unknown)

Alexander Max Koester (10 February 1864, Bergneustadt - 21 December 1932, Munich) was a German landscape and animal painter. He specialized in scenes with ducks.

== Life and work ==
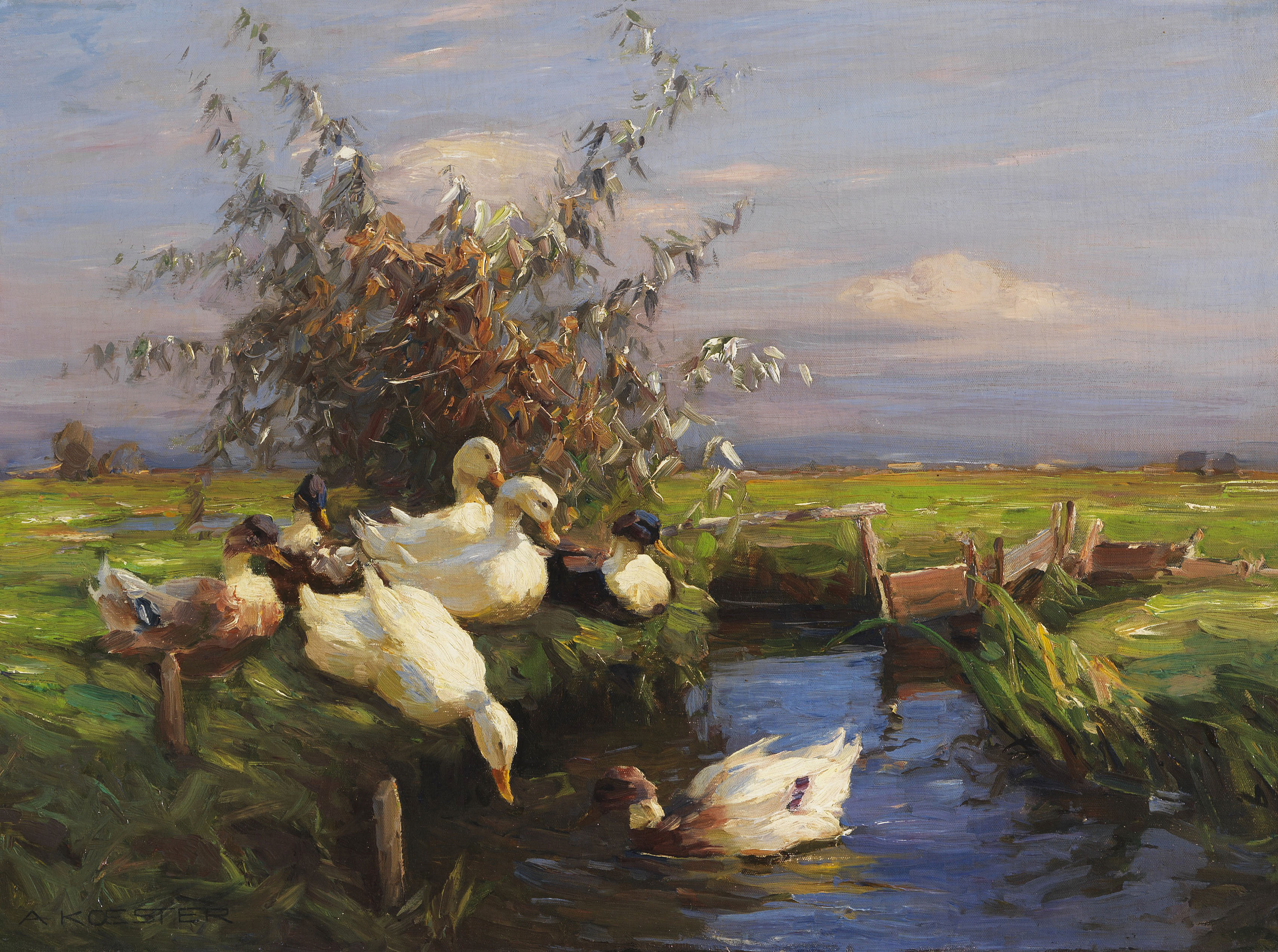
Seven Ducks at the Ditch

His father was a hosiery manufacturer. In 1882, following his parents' wishes, he began an apprenticeship at a pharmacy in Winzenheim (now in France). After completing his training there, he pursued his own interests; enrolling at the Academy of Fine Arts, Karlsruhe, where he studied with Karl Hoff and Claus Meyer. As a student, he supported himself by painting portraits, but he later focused on landscapes.

He spent the decade from 1885 to 1895 making study trips: to the Black Forest, the Vosges, Munich, and Tyrolia. While visiting the town of Klausen, a gathering place for artists, he met Isabella Kantioler, the daughter of an innkeeper. They were married in 1893. After completing his studies, in 1896, they settled in Klausen. He had first became interested in ducks while observing a colony of them that belonged to his father-in-law. In addition to painting them, he studied their anatomy and behavior.

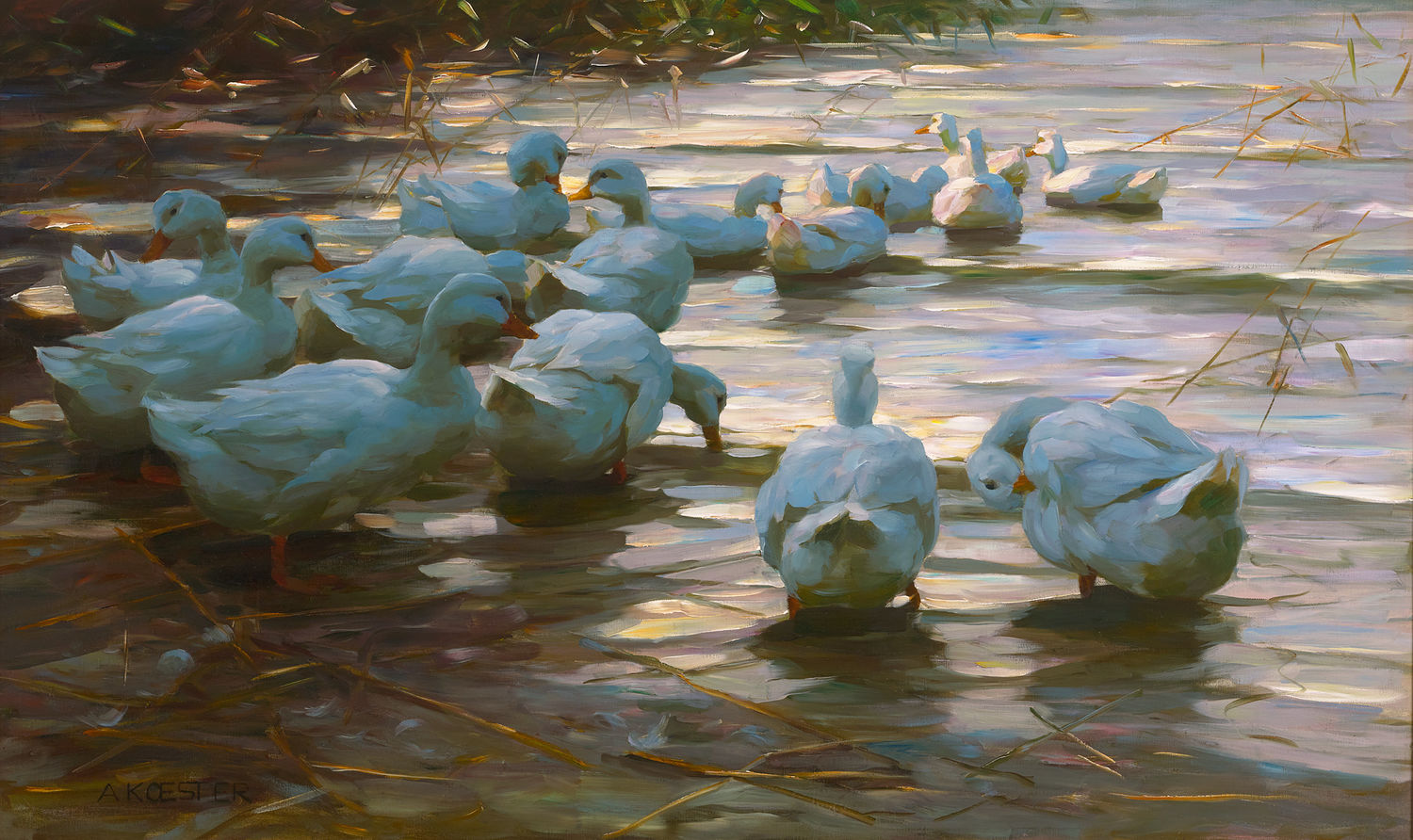
Alexander Koester, Ducks in a Pond, early 20th century. Oil on canvas. Private collection.

He soon became an expert on duck breeds and breeding. His portraits of them became very popular. It was said that he charged for his works according to the number of ducks in the picture. One of them was acquired by Kaiser Wilhelm II in 1900. The art school in Darmstadt offered him a position, but he declined, preferring to work free-lance. To gain better access to his buyers, he rented a studio in Munich, where he worked during the summer. He also became a member of the artist's cooperative there. In 1902, he won a small gold medal at the Große Berliner Kunstausstellung; and another at the Louisiana Purchase Exposition in 1904.

In 1915, Klausen was declared to be part of a war zone, and his house was confiscated. He moved to Dießen am Ammersee and set up a new studio. His son had been killed not long after the war started. After that, he focused on landscapes and still-lifes, but never lost his interest in ducks. Most of his works outside of private collections are held at the Neue Pinakothek in Munich.

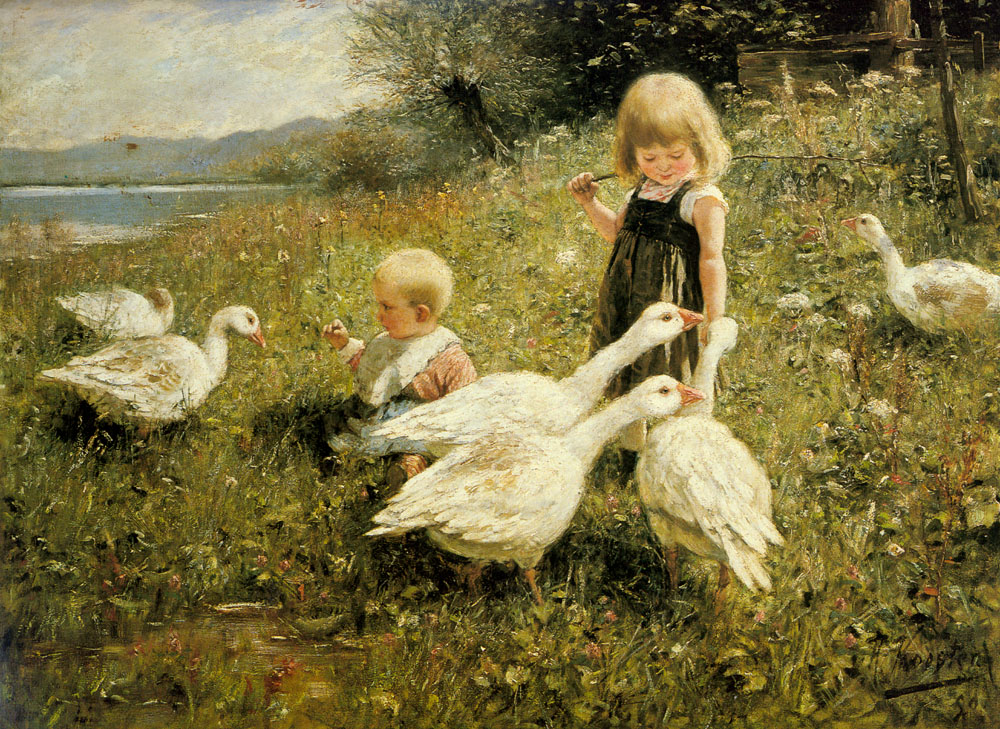
Feeding the Geese
