= Willi Geiger (painter) =

German painter (1878–1971)

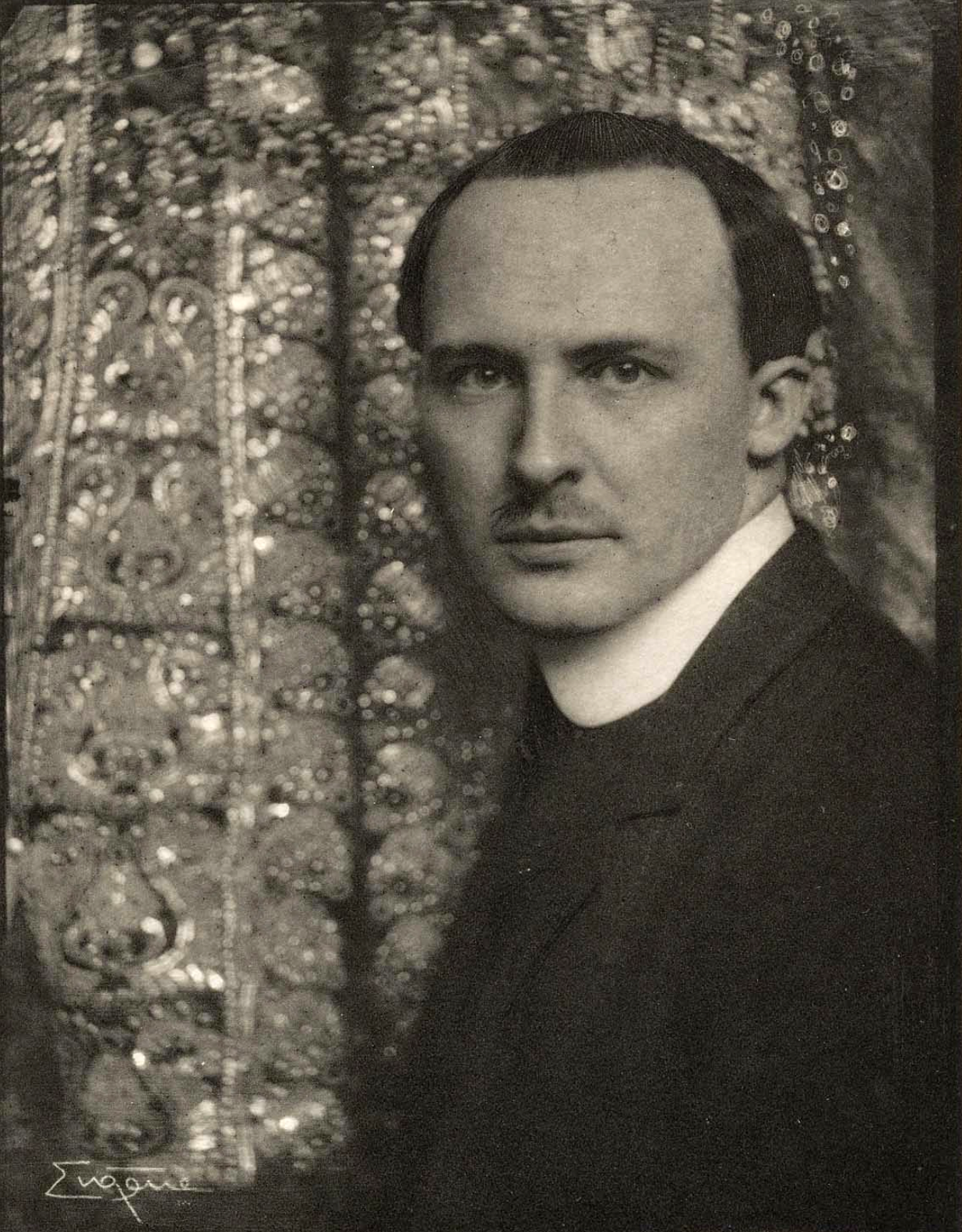
Willi Geiger (1910); photograph by Frank Eugene

Willi Geiger (17 August 1878 in Landshut – 11 February 1971 in Munich) was a German painter.

== Biography ==
Willi Geiger was born 1878 in Landshut. He was a son of a teacher. From 1898 to 1899, he attended the Munich Arts and Crafts School, and later the Technical University, where he passed the state examination to teach drawing. Willi Geiger studied with Franz Von Stuck at the Munich Academy from 1903, alongside Hans Purrmann. He was awarded the National prize and the Schack scholarship for some of his early work and he traveled to Spain, Italy, and North Africa. Willi Geiger was awarded the 1910 Villa Romana prize for his success as a graphic designer. He worked with Richard Dehmel, Frank Wedekind, and others.

Geiger lived until 1914 in Berlin and presented in the gallery. Then he went back to Munich and became a professor at the School of Decorative Arts. He copied paintings by the great Spanish painters Goya, Velasquez, and El Greco and turned to portrait painting. Geiger's study of El Greco's work is reflected in his portrait of the composer Hans Pfitzner.

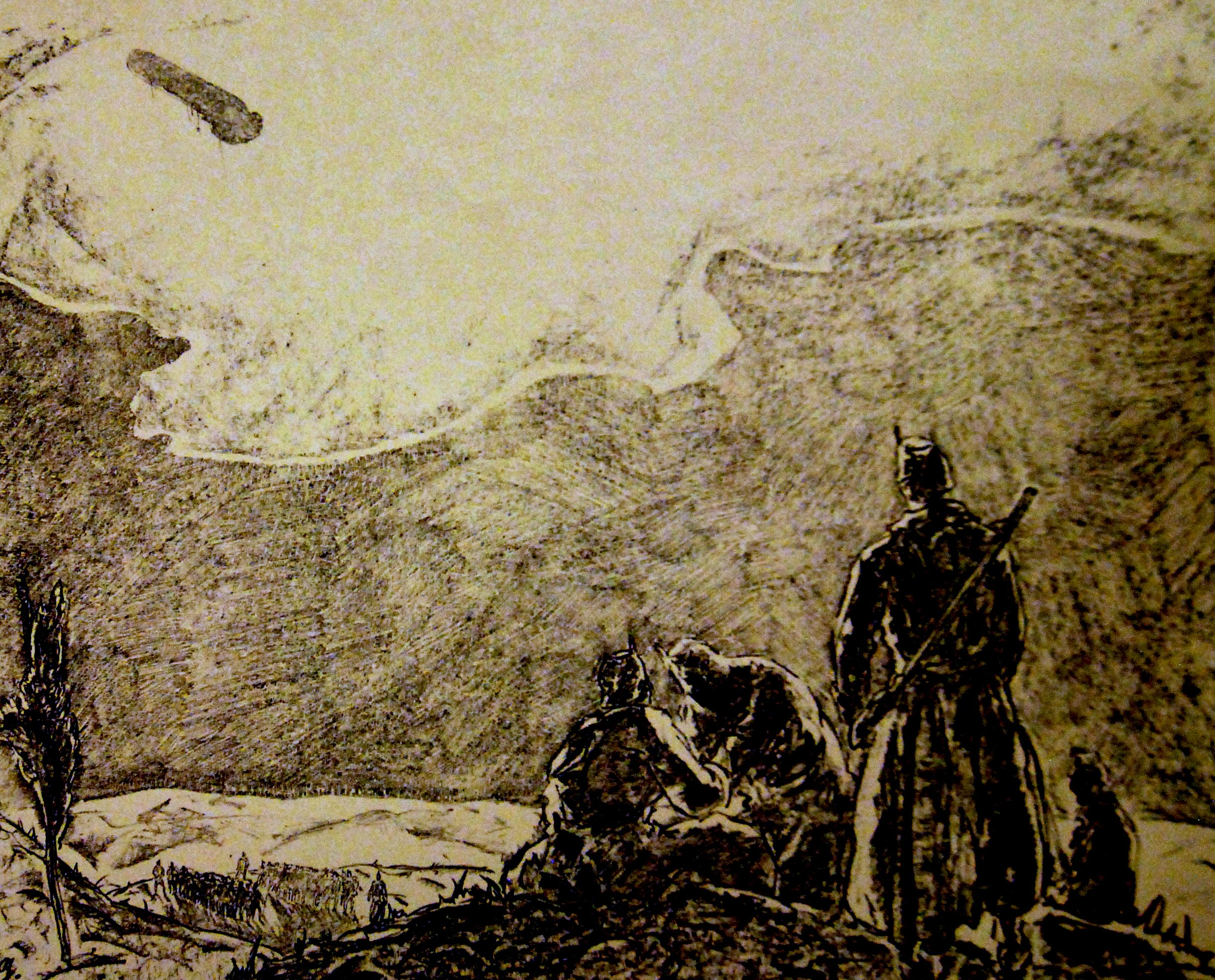
German soldiers underneath an airship

After the seizure of power by the Nazis, he was dismissed as a lecturer at the Leipzig Academy. He was politically opposed to the Nazi Party, and his artworks were deemed "degenerate" by the authorities. On retirement, he continued to paint. After the war, in 1946 Willi Geiger taught again at the College of Fine Arts in Munich. In 1951, he received the Culture Prize of the City of Munich where he lived until his death in 1971.

Willi Geiger's son, Rupprecht Geiger, also became a well-known artist and professor.

== See also ==
- List of German painters
