= Florian Seidl =

Florian Seidl (born March 2, 1979, in Salzburg) is a vehicle and product designer from Austria. He studied Industrial Design at the University of Arts and Industrial Design Linz, the Hong Kong Polytechnic University and got his master's degree from the Royal College of Art in London.

Since 2008 he has been living and working in Turin, Italy. At Centro Stile Fiat he was a senior member of the design team that developed the Fiat 500 successfully into a range of different models and other projects that can now be seen on the road. In 2015 he joined Lavazza to set up a compact in-house design team from scratch. In that function, he is responsible for the corporate design of Lavazza. Numerous products designed for the Italian group have won important design awards and during the last few years he helped to position Lavazza firmly on the map of modern Italian design.

He was named on Perspective's 40 under 40 list for Product Design in 2019 and his work was exhibited on several occasions. Amongst others at the RCA's Great Exhibition, the Global Cities exhibition at the Tate Modern and the London Transport Museum.

== Awards ==
- iF Design Awards
- Red Dot Design Awards
- German Design Awards
- A' Design Awards
- BigSEE Product Design Award, winner, 2019
- Perspective 40 under 40, Product Design, 2019
- Worshipful Company of Carmen Transportation Design Award, first prize, 2007
- Worshipful Company of Coachmakers and Coach Harness Makers Award, shortlisted, 2007
- Geoff Lawson Jaguar Scholarship, shortlisted, 2007
- Interior Motives Awards, finalist, 2006
- Emanuel und Sophie Fohn Stipendium, scholarship, 2006
- Hong Kong Austrian Educational Foundation, scholarship, 2003

== Jury Membership ==
- "ADI, Osservatorio Permanente del Design, ADI Piemonte".
- German Design Award | Rat für Formgebung, 2024
- "Cardesign Review X, 2023".
- "Design Intelligence Awards, 2023, Jury Panel".
- "A' Design Award, Jury Panel".
- "London Design Award, Jury Panel".
- "Muse Design Award, Jury Panel".
- "Azerbaijan Design Award, 2022".
- "Rethinking the Future Awards, 2021, Jury Panel".
- "European Good Design Awards, Jury Panel".
- "Frame Awards, 2021, ANNOUNCING THE SHORTLISTS AND JURIES OF OUR SPATIAL CATEGORIES".
