= Markus Heinsdorff =

German installation artist

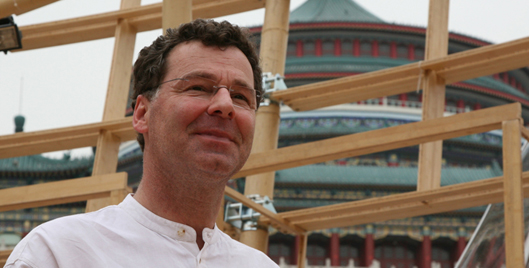
- Born: 1954 (age 71–72); Steinkirchen, Germany
- Known for: Installation art

Markus Heinsdorff (born 1954) is a German installation artist working in the areas of design, architecture and photography.

== Life and work ==
Heinsdorff was born in 1954 in Steinkirchen, Germany. He grew up in Irschenhausen, south to Munich, Germany. He started his career working as a goldsmith, wood and stone sculptor before he studied abstract sculpture under Prof. Jacobsen at the Academy of Fine Arts, Munich (1976 to 1981). He is based in Munich, Germany. In various works in India, Thailand, Indonesia, Vietnam, China, Taiwan, Ecuador, Brazil, USA, South Africa and numerous European countries he realized projects, installations and exhibitions – also in relation to the UNESCO Aschberg program, the Goethe-Institut and the German Foreign Office. In most countries he develops on-site projects involving local conditions and materials on topics like recycling and sustainability. This also applies for the various pavilion constructions that were realized as art buildings and mobile spaces for the presentation of Germany in China (2007–2010) and India (2012–2013) and successively toured through five megacities in each country. In this framework he created the German-Chinese house at the Expo Shanghai 2010, a 300 sqm, two-story building made of bamboo. His Expo house and the 22 further pavilions are one of the few modern and self-supporting constructions in the world made of the nature material bamboo in combination of natural cane and laminates. He developed special new joining techniques and construction methods for these projects. The works were done with support of the structural planners and engineers of Schlaich Bergermann & Partner, Stuttgart, Rein Ingenieure, Stuttgart und Varicon, Würzburg, W. Schachl, Munich and the universities Technical University of Munich, Technische Universität Darmstadt and Tongji University, Shanghai. In 2011 Markus Heinsdorff published the book "design with nature – the bamboo architecture" (in Chinese, English, German). His next book on "textile architecture" is published in 2014.

In continuation of the realized mobile spaces and pavilions new creative and technical ideas for environmentally friendly low-cost buildings and projects emerged. Heinsdorff therefore does several workshops, lectures and exhibitions on this topic in many countries. By the end of 2013 the art and architecture buildings are presented at the exhibition "Low Cost Houses and Pavilions" at the Haus der Architektur of the Bayerische Architektenkammer Munich, Germany.

Besides his art and architecture projects and experiences with bamboo and fabric, his work is dedicated to the element water. Since 1990, a variety of installations and objects with or about this essence of life were created and exhibited around the world. From 2008 on the art and science cooperation wasser-werke was established together with the Hydromechanics Laboratory of the Technical University of Munich. Several exhibits were developed. In various exhibitions and installations were exhibited around the globe, i.e. the object "Rotor (also awarded with the Siemens empowering people. Award) at MARTa Herford (on the occasion of the Recycling-Designpreis), "about water" in São Paulo with portraits of favela residents, "air rings in water" in Rio de Janeiro on the occasion of the Rio+20 sustainability conference of the United Nations, on the topic of monsoon in Bangalore and in Bali/Ubud as well as a sound installation with water drops at the Max-Planck-House for the long night of the museums.

== Exhibitions (a selection) ==
- 2012–2013: Germany and India – Urban Mela, 22 pavilions (mobile space), presentation of Germany in Mumbai, Bangalore, Chennai, Delhi, Pune, India
- 2010: EXPO Shanghai, German-Chinese House, Shanghai, China
- 2007–2009: German-Chinese Esplanade, Wuhan, Shenyang, Chongquing, Guangzhou, Nanjing, China

== Guest professorships ==
- 2007–2010: Faculty for Architecture, Southeast University Nanjing, China
- 2008–2010: Faculty for Architecture, Chongqing University, China
- 2009–2012: School of Architecture and Urban Planning, Huazhong University of Science and Technology, Wuhan, China

== Publications ==
- Isarinstallation, Markus Heinsdorff, Gottfried Knapp, Objektiv Verlag München 1990
- Der Garten von Las-Fosses, Markus Heinsdorff, Gottfried Knapp, Hatje Cantz, Ostfildern 1995, ISBN 3-89322-811-X
- stones & voices, Markus Heinsdorff, Martin Rosenthal, Stefan Iglhaut, Gabriele Kübler, Noemi Smolik, Hatje Cantz, München 1995
- Praxisinstallationen, Markus Heinsdorff, Udo Kittelmann, Parat Verlags GmbH München 1996
- Tenso, Markus Heinsdorff, Peter Anselm Riedl, 1996
- Windows: Marco Polo's Dream, Markus Heinsdorff, Martin Rosenthal, Agnes Kohlmeyer, Elmar Zorn, Hatje Cantz, Ostfildern 1998, ISBN 3-89322-427-0
- Markus Heinsdorff: Design with Nature – Die Bambusbauten/The Bamboo Architecture, Hirmer Verlag München 2010, ISBN 3-7774-2791-8
