= Kleines Spiel =

Theater in Munich, Bavaria, Germany

Coordinates: 48°09′17″N 11°34′22″E

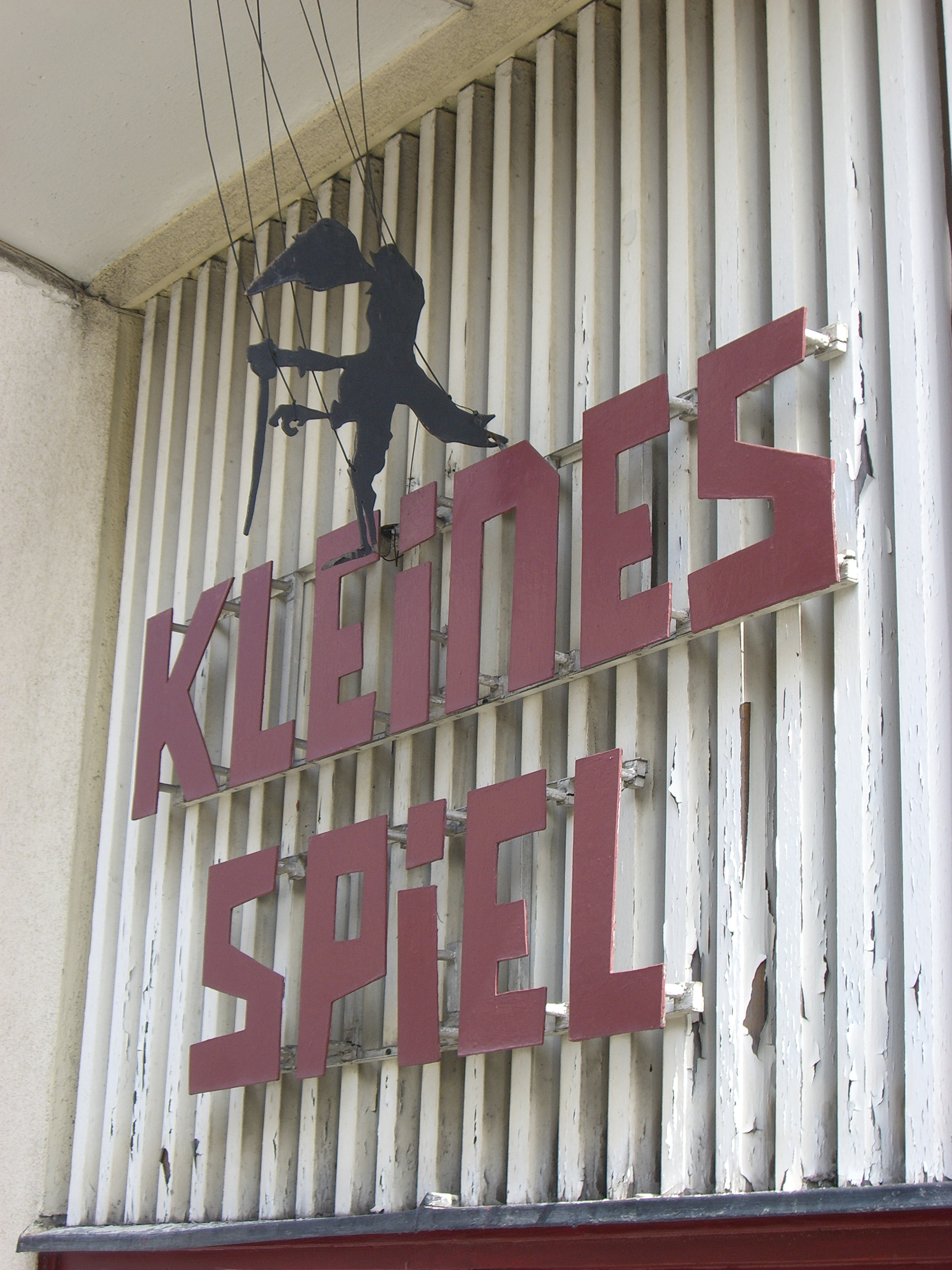

Kleines Spiel is a theatre in Munich, Bavaria, Germany.
