= Frank Eugene =

American photographer (1865–1936)

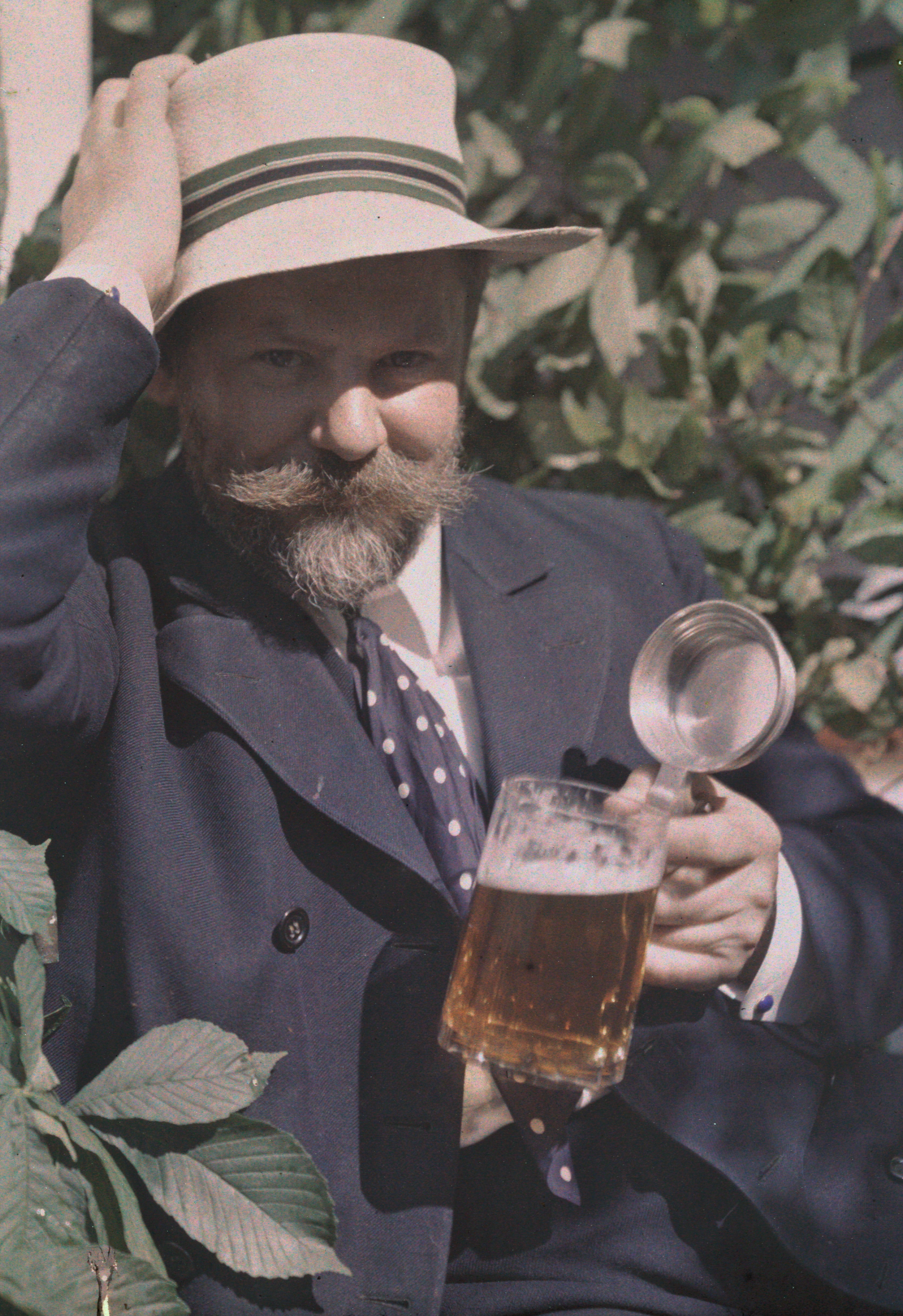
Autochrome of Eugene by Alfred Stieglitz, 1907

Frank Eugene (Born Frank Eugene Smith; 19 September 1865 – 16 December 1936) was an American-born photographer who was a founding member of the Photo-Secession and one of the first university-level professors of photography in the world.

== Early life ==
Eugene was born in New York City as Frank Eugene Smith. His father was Frederick Smith, a German baker who changed his last name from Schmid after moving to America in the late 1850s. His mother was Hermine Selinger Smith, a singer who performed in local German beer halls and theaters.

About 1880, Eugene began to photograph for amusement, possibly while he was attending the City College of New York. In 1886, he moved to Munich in order to attend the Bavarian Academy of Fine Arts, where he studied drawing and stage design.

== Career ==
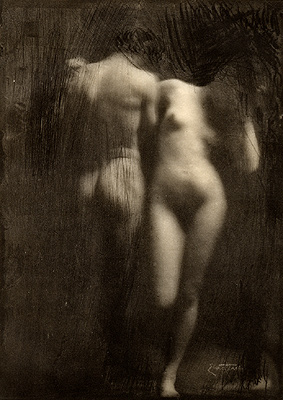
Frank Eugene: Adam and Eve, taken 1898, published in Camera Work no. 30, 1910

After graduating from the Bavarian Academy of Fine Arts, he started a career as a theatrical portraitist, drawing portraits of actors and actresses. He continued his interest in photography, although little is known of his teachers or influences.

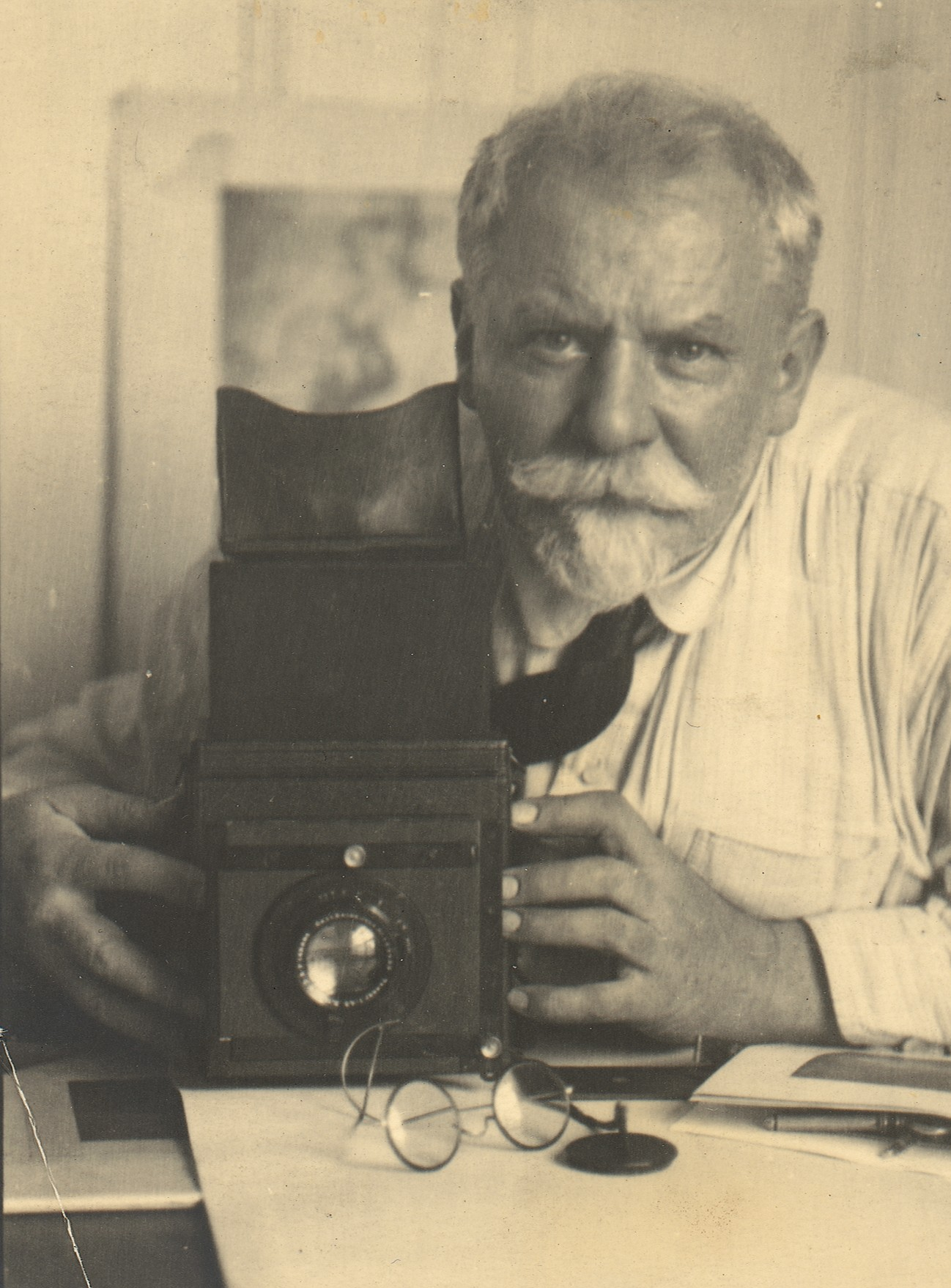
Self-portrait, 1924

He returned to the United States, and in 1899, he exhibited photographs at the Camera Club of New York under name Frank Eugene. The critic Sadakichi Hartmann wrote a review of the show, saying "It is the first time that a truly artistic temperament, a painter of generally recognized accomplishments and ability asserts itself in American photography."

A year later he was elected to The Linked Ring, and fourteen of his prints were shown that year in a major London exhibition. Already at this stage in his career he had developed a highly distinctive style that was influenced by his training as a painter. He assertively manipulated his negatives with both scratches and brush strokes, creating prints that had the appearance of a blend between painting and photography. When his prints were shown at the Camera Club in New York, one reviewer commented that his work was "unphotographic photography."

In the summer of 1900, an entire issue of Camera Notes was devoted to his art, an honor accorded only a few other photographers.

In early 1901, he traveled to Egypt. He returned a few months later and met with photographer F. Holland Day in Narragansett, R.I., during the summer. In late 1902, Eugene becomes a Founder of the Photo-Secession and a member of its governing Council. In 1904, a gravure of his was published in Camera Work, No. 5 (January).

=== Move to Germany ===
In 1906, Eugene moved permanently to Germany. He was recognized there both as a painter and a photographer, but initially he worked primarily with prominent painters such as Fritz von Uhde, Hendrik Heyligers, Willi Geiger, and Franz Roh. He photographed many of these and other artists at the same time. He also designed tapestries that he used as backgrounds in his photographs.

A year later he became a lecturer on pictorial photography at the "Lehr- und Versuchsanstalt für Photographie” (“Teaching and Research Institute for Photography”), a Bavarian State Government Subsidised Educational Institution. At this point, photography rather than painting became his primary interest. He experimented with the new color process of Autochromes, and three of his color prints are exhibited at Alfred Stieglitz's Photo-Secession Galleries in New York.

In 1909, two more of his gravures were published in Camera Work, No. 25 (January). In 1910, twenty-seven of his photographs were exhibited at a major exhibition in Buffalo, New York. The catalog for this show described Eugene as the first photographer to make successful platinum prints on Japan tissue. Ten more of his gravures published in Camera Work, No.30 (April), and fourteen additional images appear in No.31 (July).

More than any other photographer of the early 20th century, Eugene was recognized as the master of the manipulated image. Photographic historian Weston Naef described his style this way:

The very boldness with which Eugene manipulated the negative by scratching and painting forced even those with strong sympathy for the purist line of thinking like White, Day and Stieglitz to admire Eugene's particular touch...[he] created a new syntax for the photographic vocabularity, for no one before him had hand-worked negatives with such painterly intentions and a skill unsurpassed by his successors.

In 1913, he was appointed Royal Professor of Pictorial Photography by the Royal Academy of the Graphic Arts of Leipzig. This professorship, created especially for Eugene, is the first chair for pictorial photography anywhere in the world. Two years later Eugene gave up his U.S. citizenship and became a citizen of Germany. He continued teaching for many years and was head of the photography department at the Royal Academy until it closed in 1927.

Eugene died of heart failure in Munich in 1936.

== Works ==
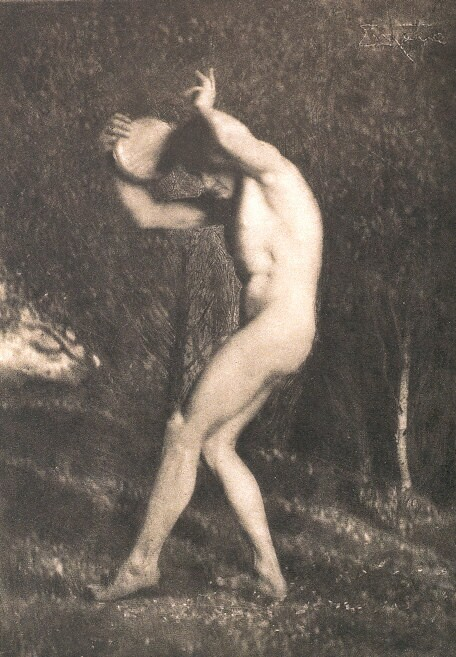
Male Nude, 1897

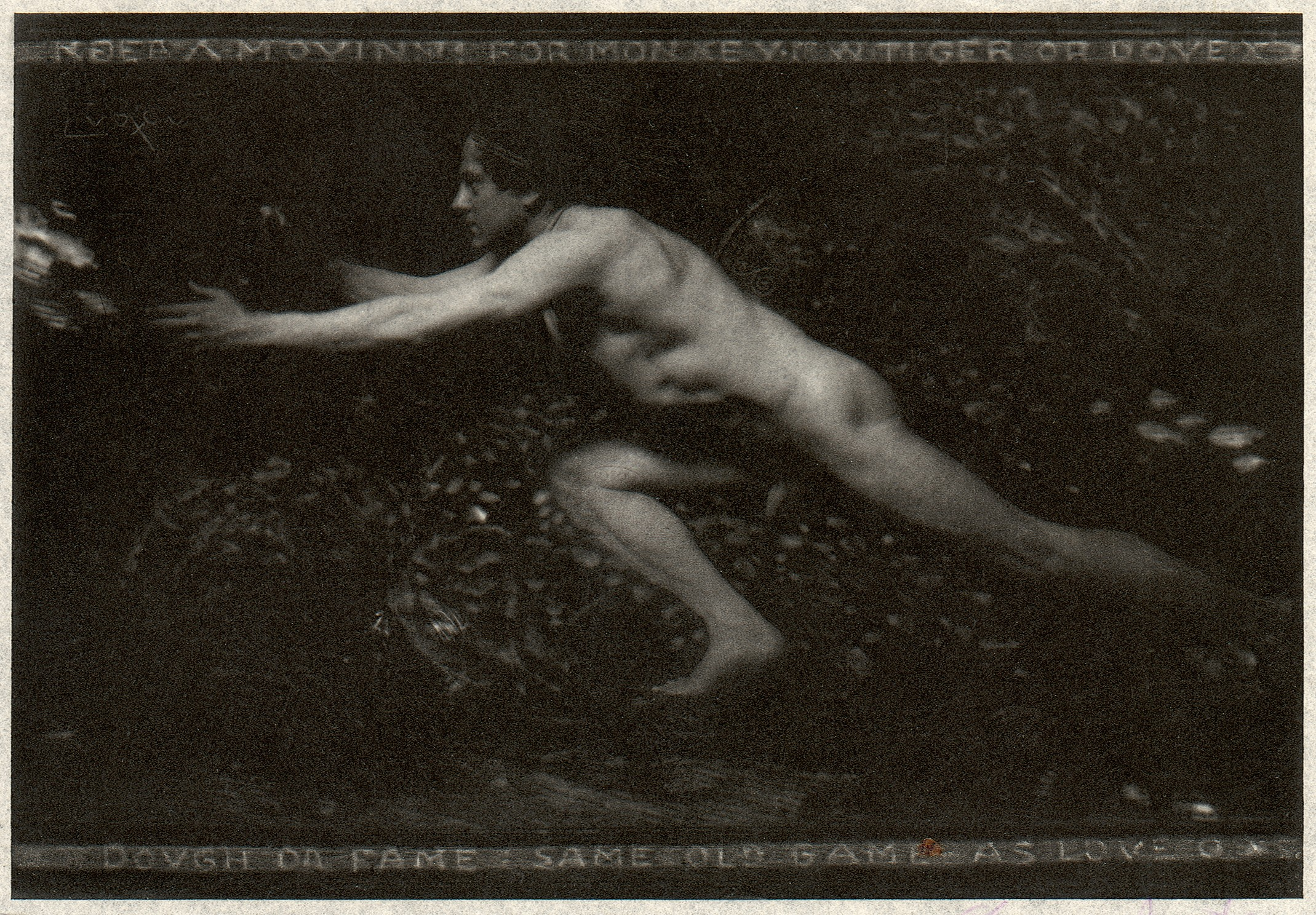
Keep a Movin'! For Monkey * Fan * Tiger or Dove- Dough or Fame- Same Old Game as Love at the Metropolitan Museum of Art

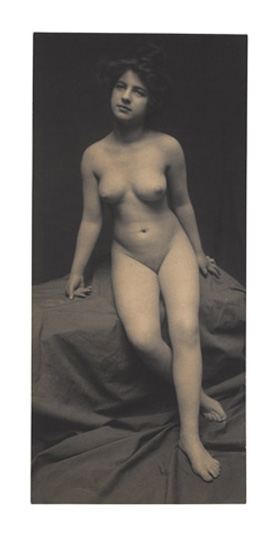
Nude study, c. 1900

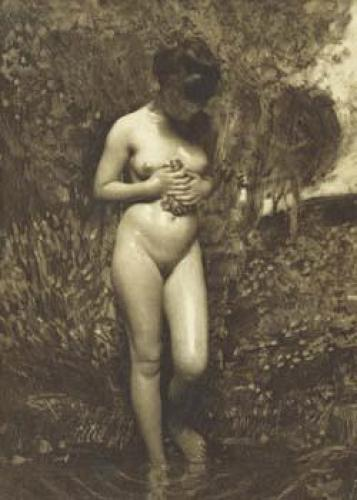
Nude study, c. 1908

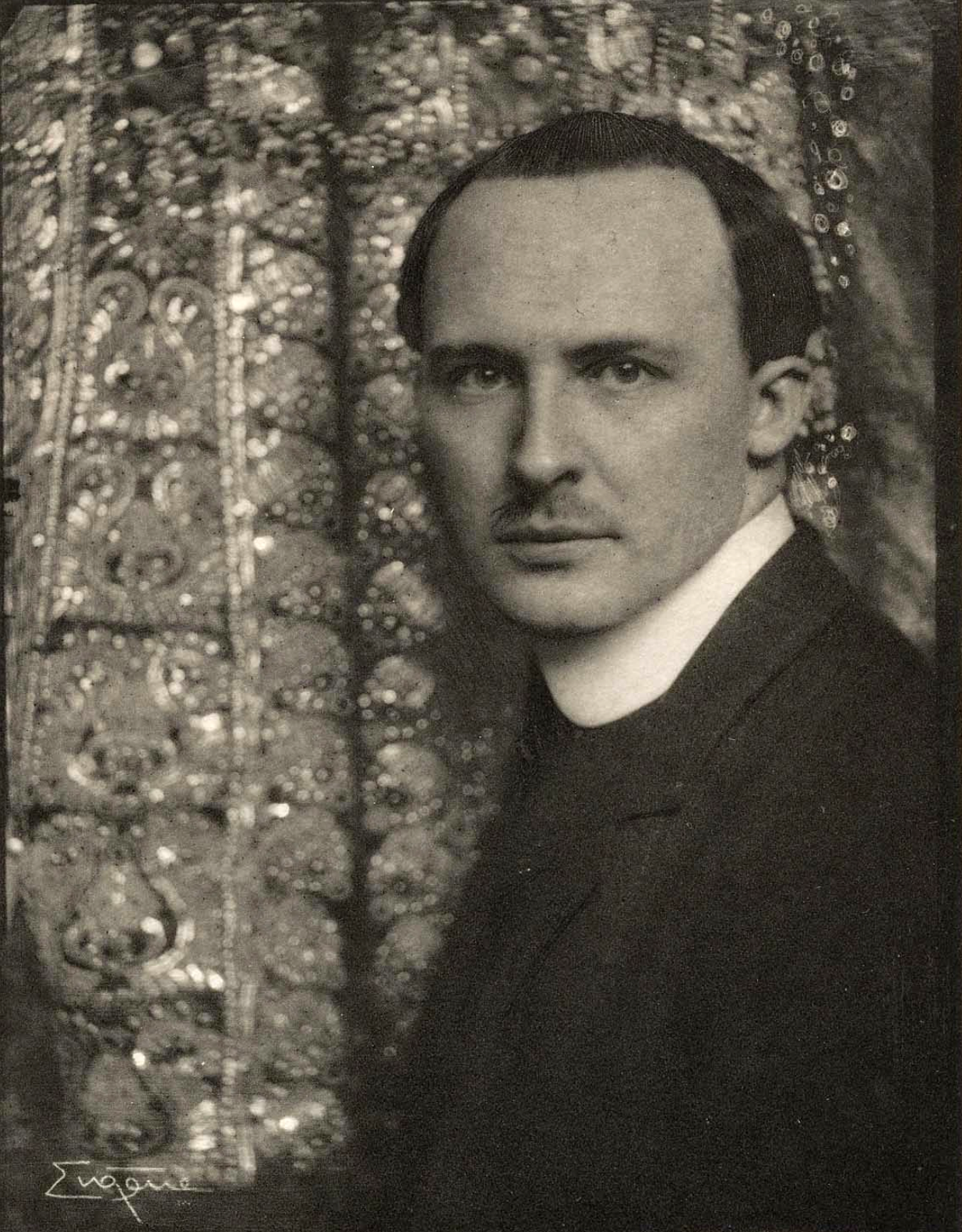
Willi Geiger, 1910
