= Heppel & Ettlich =

Coordinates: 48°09′40″N 11°35′20″E

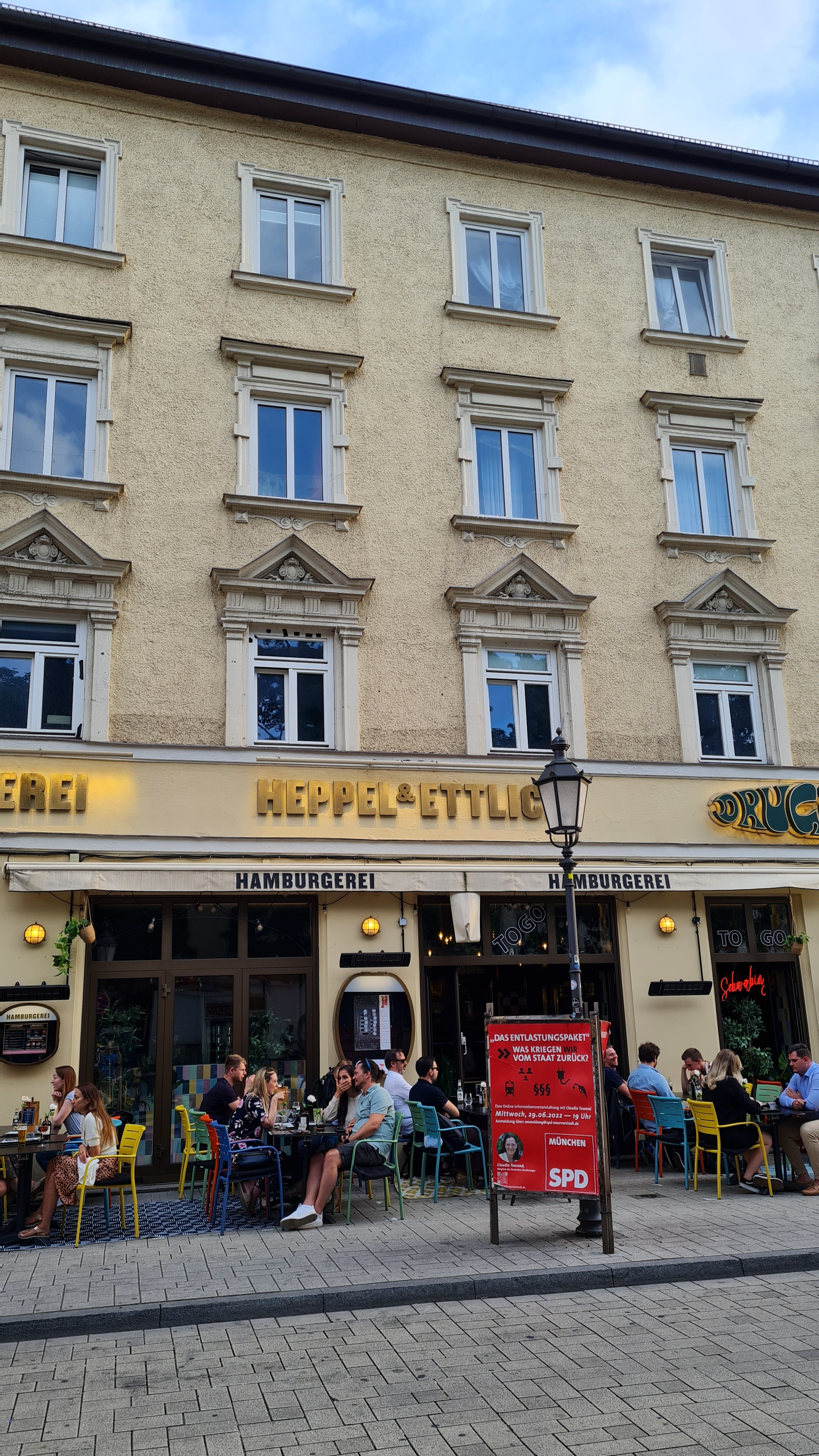
Heppel & Ettlich theater

Heppel & Ettlich is a theatre in Munich, Bavaria, Germany.
