= Lili Baruch =

German photographer (1895–1966)

Auguste Lilly Marga Baruch (5 January 1895 – 23 April 1966) was a German photographer who worked and lived in Berlin in the 1920s.

== Life ==
Born in Berlin, Baruch was born the daughter of the merchant Oskar Baruch and Helene (née Loewÿ), living at Oranienburger Straße 69. Around 1919, she married Peter Salomon Altschul, hence the name Altschul-Baruch.

As owner of the "Atelier Lili Baruch" in Berlin, Kurfürstendamm 201, she photographed actors and dancers of the Goldenen Zwanziger Jahre with a Leica, including silent film star Ernst Hofmann and Lisa Weise, sculptor Renée Sintenis and her sculptural works, and art dealers Alfred Flechtheim and Leo Blumenreich. Valeska Gert and Tatjana Barbakoff danced not only for the theatre audience, but also for photographers like Baruch.

Between 1925 and 1931, Baruch worked for various Berlin magazines. Photographs included in Uhu magazine are: Actress Kitty Aschenbach (1925); rhythmic gymnastics after Dr. Bode, Mensendieck and Loheland (1925); dancer and actress Niddy Impekoven (1926); actress Sascha Gura (1927); boxer Max Schmeling (1927); boxer Enzo Fiermonte, actress Alexa von Porembsky and Jessie Vihrog (1928).

Hans Robertson was still joint proprietor with Baruch of the Berlin ateliers specialising in dance in late 1927. Baruch (no first name) at Kurfürstendamm 201. Baruch was thus on the pulse of the times and in the neighbourhood of other hip female photographers (largely Jewish like her), all of whom had set up shop at the eastern end of Kurfürstendamm: Frieda Riess was at Kudamm 14–15, Steffi Brandl at no. 211, Suse Byk at No. 230, Alexander Binder at No. 225, the most avant-garde of the German fashion photographers, Yva, around the corner at Bleibtreustrasse 17, and Lotte and Ruth Jacobi at Joachimsthaler Strasse 5, later Kurfürstendamm 216.

In the magazines Das Leben, Revue des Monats and Tempo – Magazin für Fortschritt und Kultur Baruch received commissions on Black and White in 1927, which referred in particular to the delimitable feature of skin colour, the new fad of German jazz, the accompanying new dance forms of Black Bottom and Charleston, as well as the Berlin Negro revues, in the mid-1920s.

From 1929 to 1931, Baruch had her photo studio at Bismarckstraße 103/104, on the 4th floor. In the Berlin Ullstein Funkblatt with programme Seven Days (1931 to 1939) in No. 25, the picture Jazz Musician playing Tuba was published in 1931. In March 1932, another picture of the actor and theatre director Heinz Hilpert appeared in the Berliner Morgenpost.

Because of her Jewish ancestry, she was forced to emigrate to Switzerland in the early 1930s with her husband and daughter Mirjam (1922–2005). She died in 1966, aged 71.

The Royal Library, Denmark in Copenhagen owns the estate of Hans Robertson. Among them is Lili Baruchs' photograph of Alfred Flechtheim in front of a work by Fernand Léger.

== Other ==
Lili Baruch's brother, Heinrich Heinz Baruch, stage name Heinz Barger, later Henry Barger, born 9 September 1898 in Berlin, was an advertising executive and from June 1929 the first impresario of the Comedian Harmonists.

After the break-up of the group, he took over the management of Weintraub's Syncopators. During a tour of Japan with the group, Heinrich Baruch emigrated to the United States in 1938, where he became a naturalised citizen and lived in New York. He died in August 1975 in Moroni (Comoros) aged 71.

== Exhibitions ==
- 2009: Tatjana Barbakoff, aa forgotten dancer in pictures and documents, including photographs by Lili Baruch, Kulturbahnhof Eller, Düsseldorf
