= Fotografie der Gegenwart =

Photographic exhibition

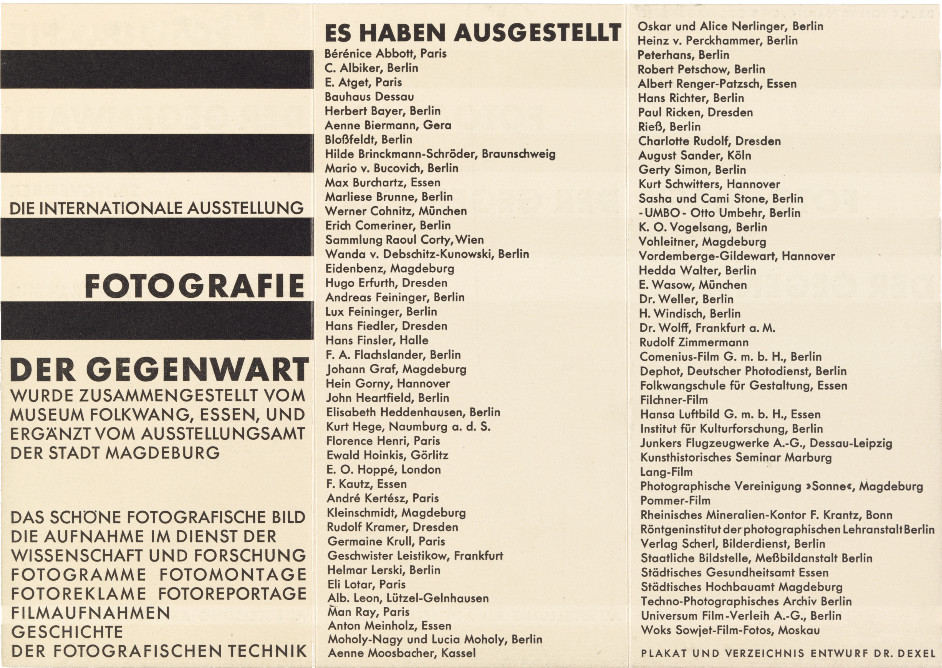
Brochure for the exhibition

Fotografie der Gegenwart (Photography of the Present) was a photographic exhibition which was one of the most important between-the-wars photographic exhibitions, particularly for its inclusion of so many artists associated with the Bauhaus/Expressionist movements.

The event was a Who's Who of Mitteleuropa photography of the period. The show was organised and curated by the art historian Kurt Wilhelm-Kästner.

The exhibition Fotografie der Gegenwart was first shown from 20 January to 17 February 1929 at Museum Folkwang in Essen and then at the Kestner-Gesellschaft in Hannover, 10 March 1929 – 17 April 1929; Galerie Neumann-Nierendorf in Berlin, 20 April 1929 – 20 May 1929; Lichthof des Neuen Rathauses in Dresden, 15 September 1929 – 6 October 1929; Ausstellungsgebäude am Adolf-Mittag-See, Magdeburg, 28 November 1929 – 19 December 1929; and the Whitechapel Gallery in London in 1929 and later at five additional venues.

== Stylistic influence ==
German designer Walter Dexel (1890–1973) designed all the publicity material for the exhibition with Paul Renner’s Futura font. The poster for the event in Magdeburg was produced using linocut.

== Participants ==
- Berenice Abbott, Paris
- Carl Albiker, Berlin
- Eugène Atget, Paris
- Herbert Bayer, Berlin
- Aenne Biermann, Gera
- Karl Blossfeldt, Berlin
- Hilde Brinkmann-Schröder, Braunschweig
- Mario von Bucovich, Berlin
- Max Burchartz, Essen
- Marliese Brunne, Berlin
- Werner Cohnitz, Munich
- Erich Comeriner, Berlin
- Sammlung Raoul Corty, Vienna
- Wanda von Debschitz-Kunowski, Berlin
- Willi Eidenbenz, Magdeburg
- Hugo Erfurth, Dresden
- Andreas Feininger, Berlin
- T. Lux Feininger, Berlin
- Hans Feidler, Dresden
- Hans Finsler, Halle
- F. A. Flachslander, Berlin
- Johann Graf, Magdeburg
- Hein Gorny, Hanover
- John Heartfield, Berlin
- Elisabeth Heddenhausen, Berlin
- Kurt Hergé, Naumburg
- Florence Henri, Paris
- Ewald Hoinkis, Görlitz
- Emil Otto Hoppé, London
- F. Kautz, Essen
- André Kertész, Paris
- Kleinschmidt, Magdeburg
- Rudolf Kramer, Dresden
- Germaine Krull, Paris
- Hans Leistikow and Grete Leistikow, Frankfurt
- Helmar Lerski, Berlin
- Eli Lotar, Berlin
- Alb. Leon, Lutzel-Gelnhausen
- Man Ray, Paris
- Anton Meinholz, Essen
- László Moholy-Nagy and Lucia Moholy, Berlin
- Aenne Mosbacher, Kassel
- Oscar and Alice Nerlinger, Berlin
- Heinz von Perckhammer, Berlin
- Walter Peterhans, Berlin
- Robert Petschow, Berlin
- Albert Renger-Patzsch, Berlin
- Hans Richter (artist), Berlin
- Paul Ricken, Dresden
- Frieda Gertrud Riess, Berlin
- Charlotte Rudolph, Dresden
- August Sander, Cologne
- Kurt Schwitters, Hanover
- Gerty Simon, Berlin
- Sasha Stone and Cami Stone, Berlin
- UMBO – Otto Umbehr, Berlin
- K.O. Vogelsang, Berlin
- Vohleitner, Magdeburg
- Friedrich Vordemberger-Gildewart, Hanover
- Hedda Walther, Berlin
- Eduard Wasow, Munich
- Dr Weller, Berlin
- H. Windisch, Berlin
- Paul Wolff, Frankfurt am Main
