= Alexander Binder (photographer) =

German photographer (1888–1929)

- Born: Alexander Binder; April 17, 1888; Alexandria, Khedivate of Egypt
- Died: February 25, 1929 (aged 40); Berlin, Weimar Republic
- Citizenship: Swiss
- Occupation: Photographer
- Years active: 1913-1929
- Known for: Portrait photography
- Notable work: Portraits of celebrities
- Spouse: Elisabeth Pinajeff (1928-29)

Alexander Binder (17 April 1888 – 25 February 1929) was a leading portrait photographer in 1920s Berlin.

== Life ==
Alexander Binder began studying engineering but dropped out. From 1908 to 1910, he attended The State Academy for Photo Design in Munich. He then moved to Berlin, where he opened his first photo studio in 1913, which was located in a walk-through room on Motzstraße 69. In 1920, Binder moved his studio to Kurfürstendamm 206 and in 1922 to Kurfürstendamm 225, in the neighbourhood of other professional photographers like Frieda Riess at Kurfürstendamm 14–15, Lili Baruch at Kudamm 201, Steffi Brandl at Kudamm 211, Suse Byk at Kudamm 230 and Yva, around the corner at Bleibtreustraße 17.

Binder specialised in portrait photography and became one of Germany′s leading portrait photographers in the Golden Twenties. Binder was represented at the 1st Annual Exhibition of Berlin Photography in 1921 at the Kunstgewerbemuseum Berlin and exhibited his own photographs in London from 1925 to 1926.

Binder created advertising and portrait photographs. In addition to fashion photography, he focused primarily on well-known Berlin personalities and international celebrities. During the filming of the movie Joyless Street, Binder photographed the young actress Greta Garbo. Portraits of well-known German actors in particular were distributed on the then popular Ross cards or Photochemie cards, among others. Binder's photographs also appeared in the monthly magazine for photography and cinematography, Die Linse.

After Binder′s death in 1929, the Atelier Binder GmbH was owned by his ex-wife Binder-Allemann and his two daughters. Until 1938, the Atelier Binder was located at Kurfürstendamm 225. The studio was closed in 1938 due to Aryanization and taken over by fashion photographer Karl Ludwig Haenchen. The Jewish studio manager, Baroness Elisabeth Müller von Stengel (1900–1978), was sent to the Theresienstadt Ghetto in 1942. The Hasse und Wiese company acquired the Binder studio in 1948 or 1949. The Binder studio regularly submitted photos to Stern magazine, a publication founded in 1948.

== Signature ==
From 1921 onwards, Binder had his own logo for his photographs: his name was inscribed in a rhombus. Until his death, his photographs were marked with lines such as ‘Alex Binder Photogr. Atelier’, ‘Alex Binder, Berlin’ or ‘Phot. A. Binder, Berlin’. Many photographs also contained Binder's written signature, either as ‘Binder’ or ‘A. Binder’.

== Family ==
Binder was married to the Russian actress Elisabeth Pinajeff from 1928 until shortly before his death in February 1929.

== Portrait gallery ==
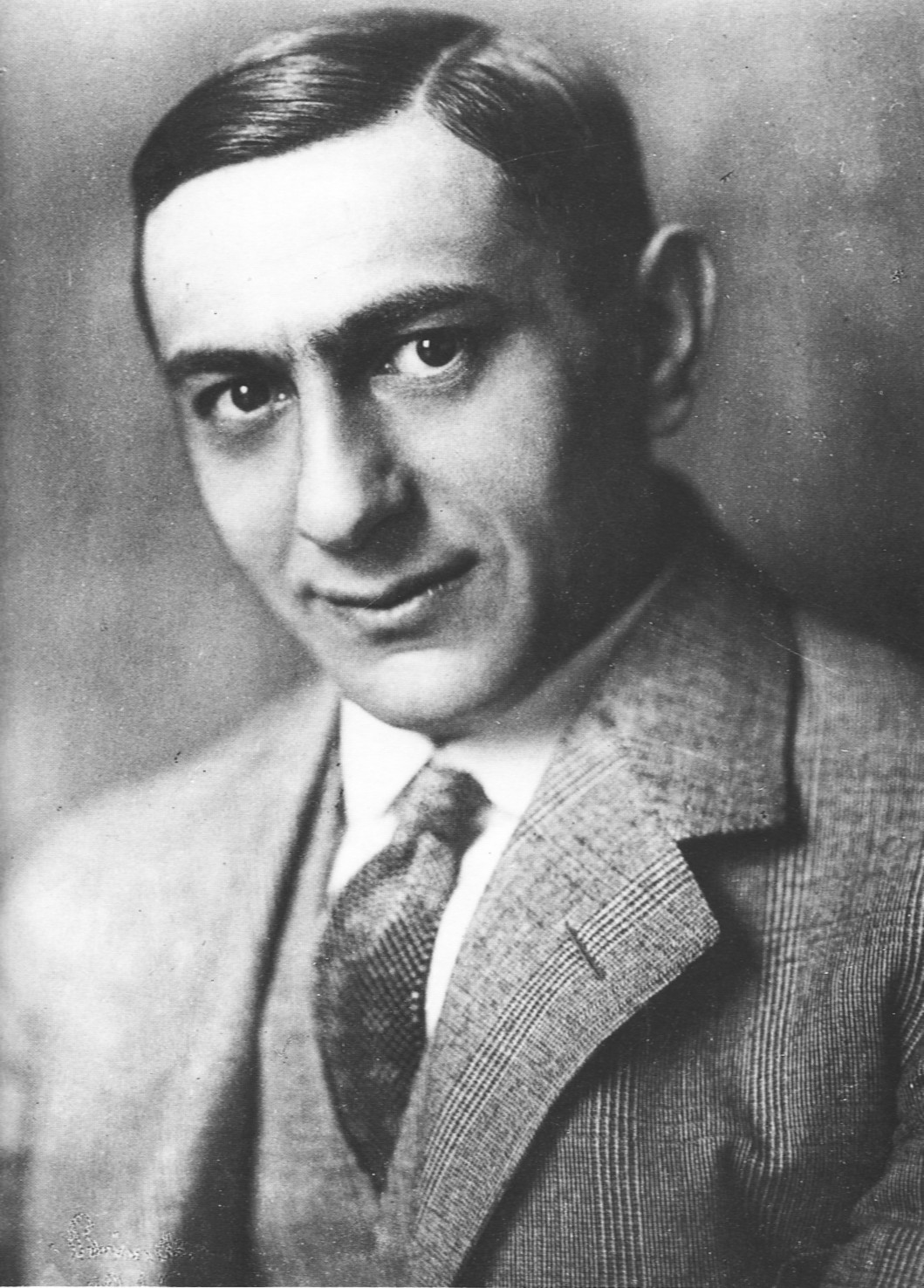
German-American film director and producer Ernst Lubitsch, 1920

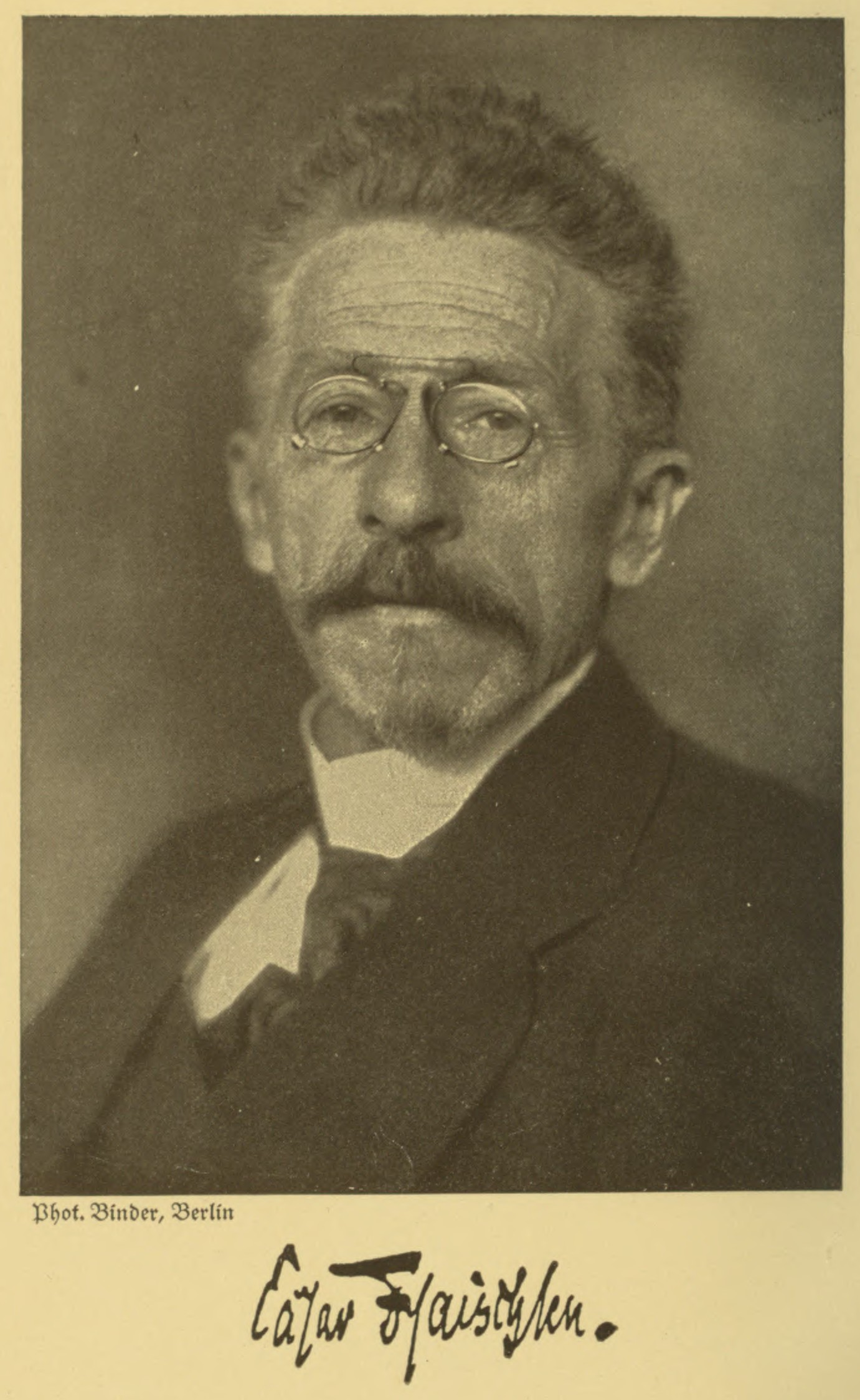
German poet Cäsar Flaischlen, around 1920

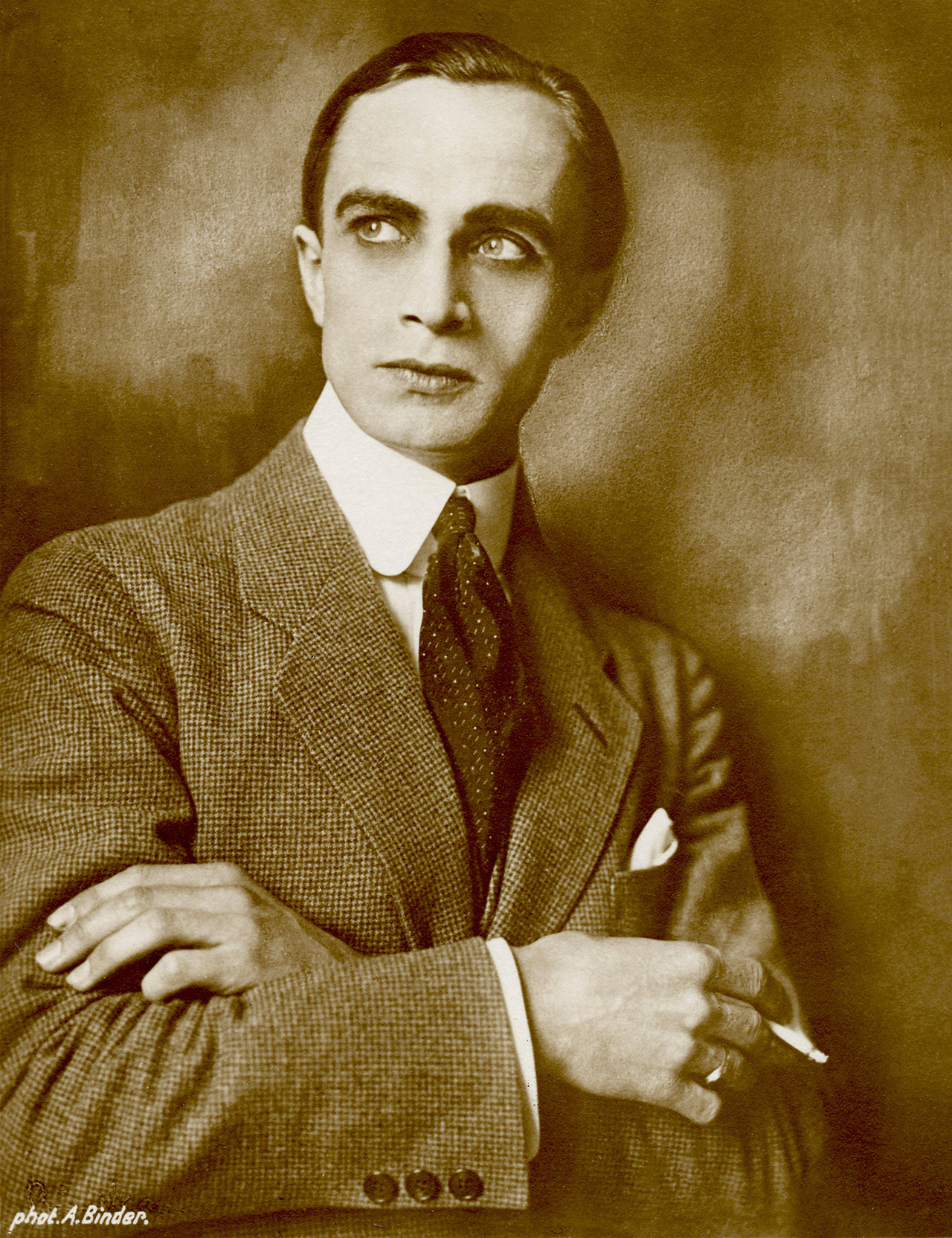
German actor Conrad Veidt, 1920

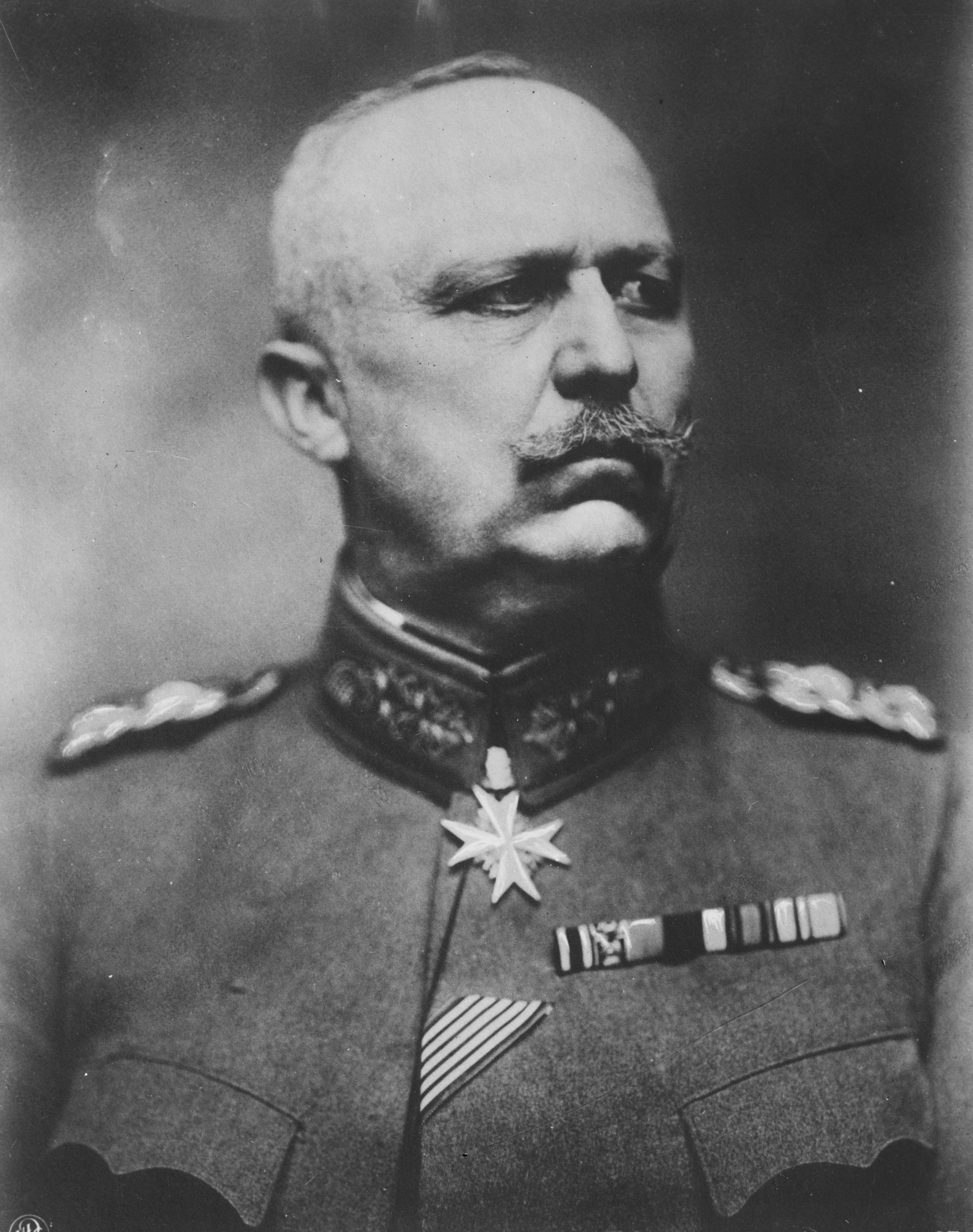
German General Erich Ludendorff, around 1920

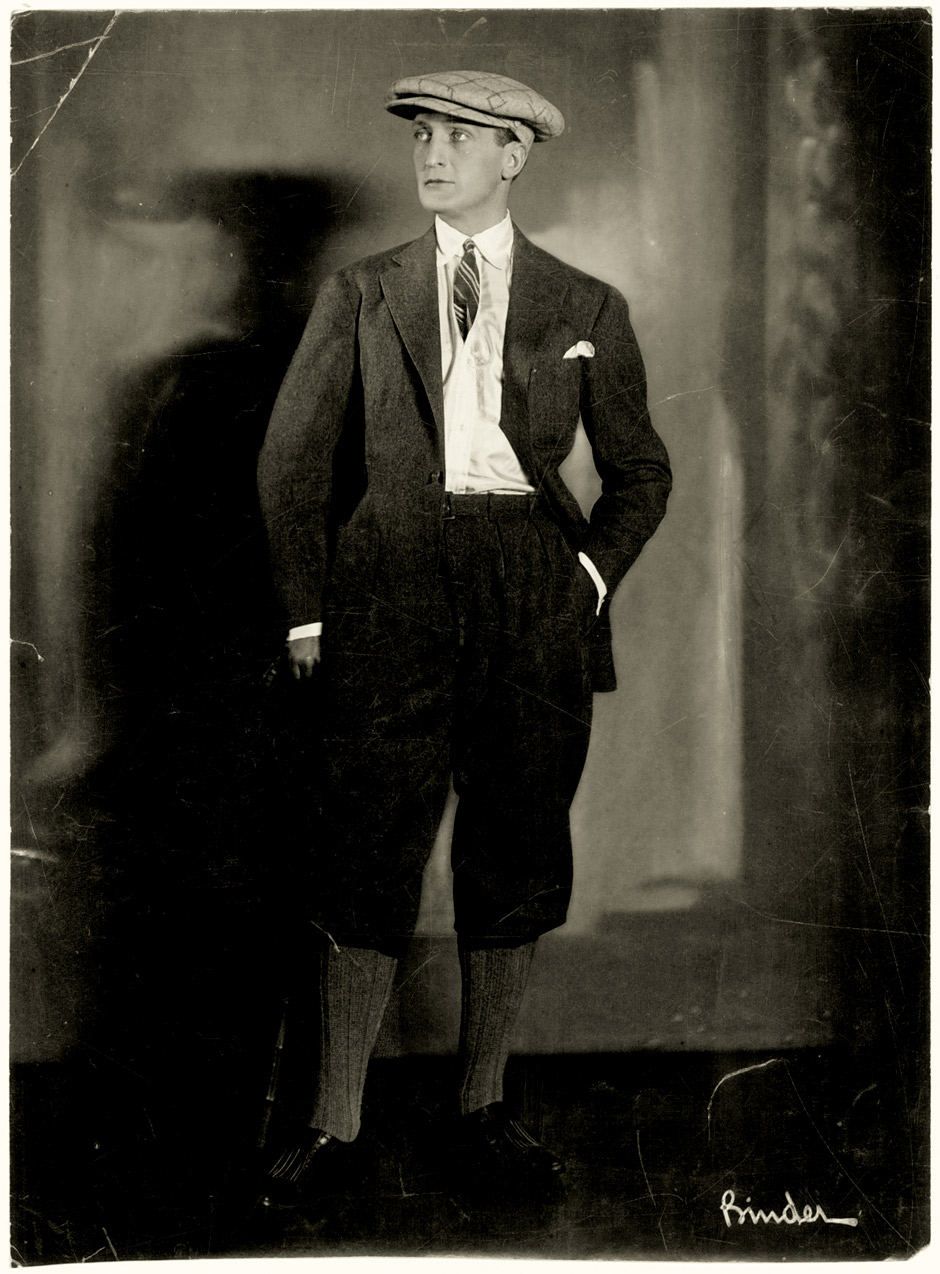
German actor Hans Albers, 1922

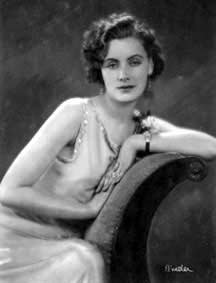
Swedish-American actress Greta Garbo, 1925

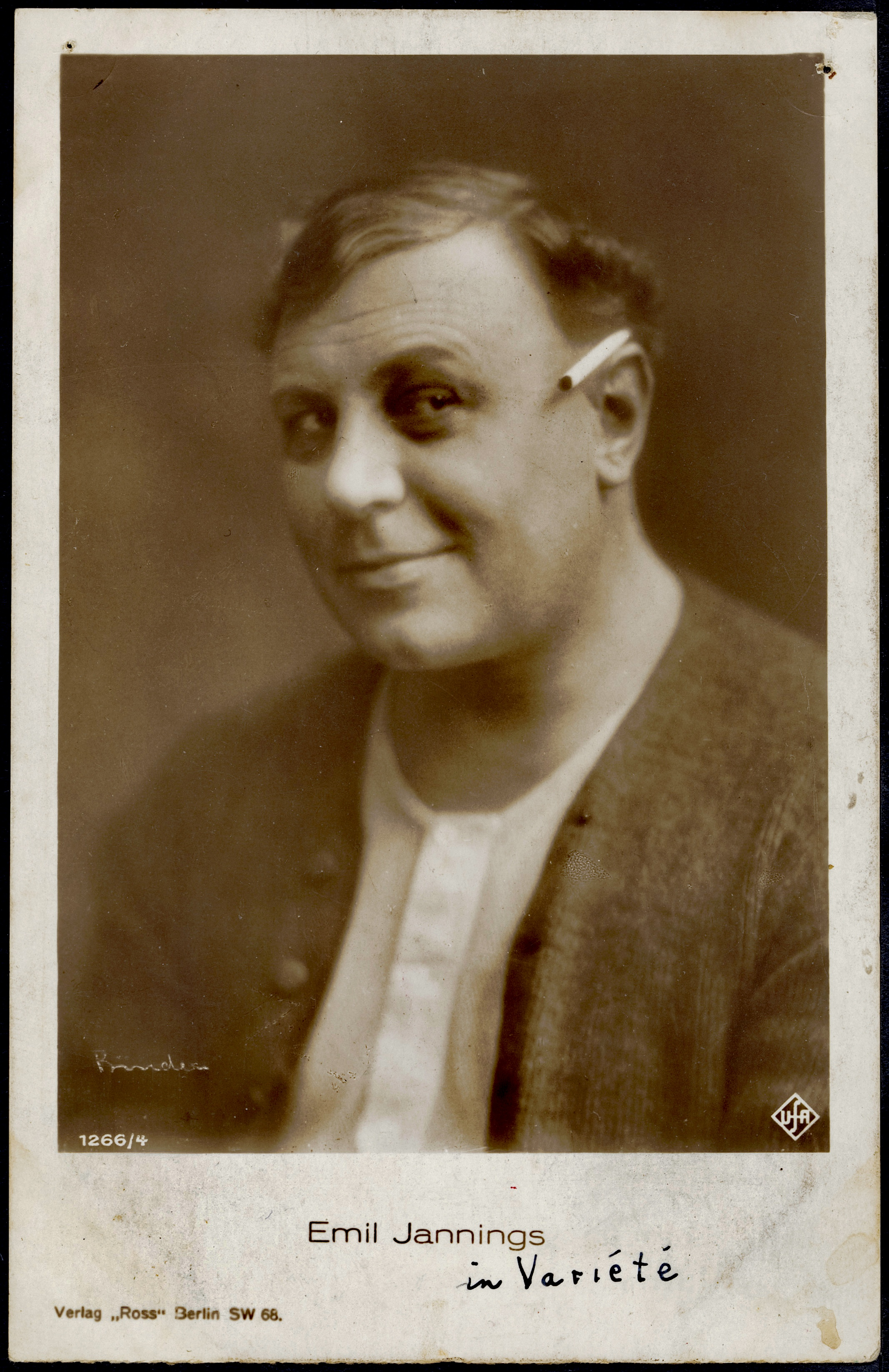
The first ever Oscar winner Emil Jannings, 1927

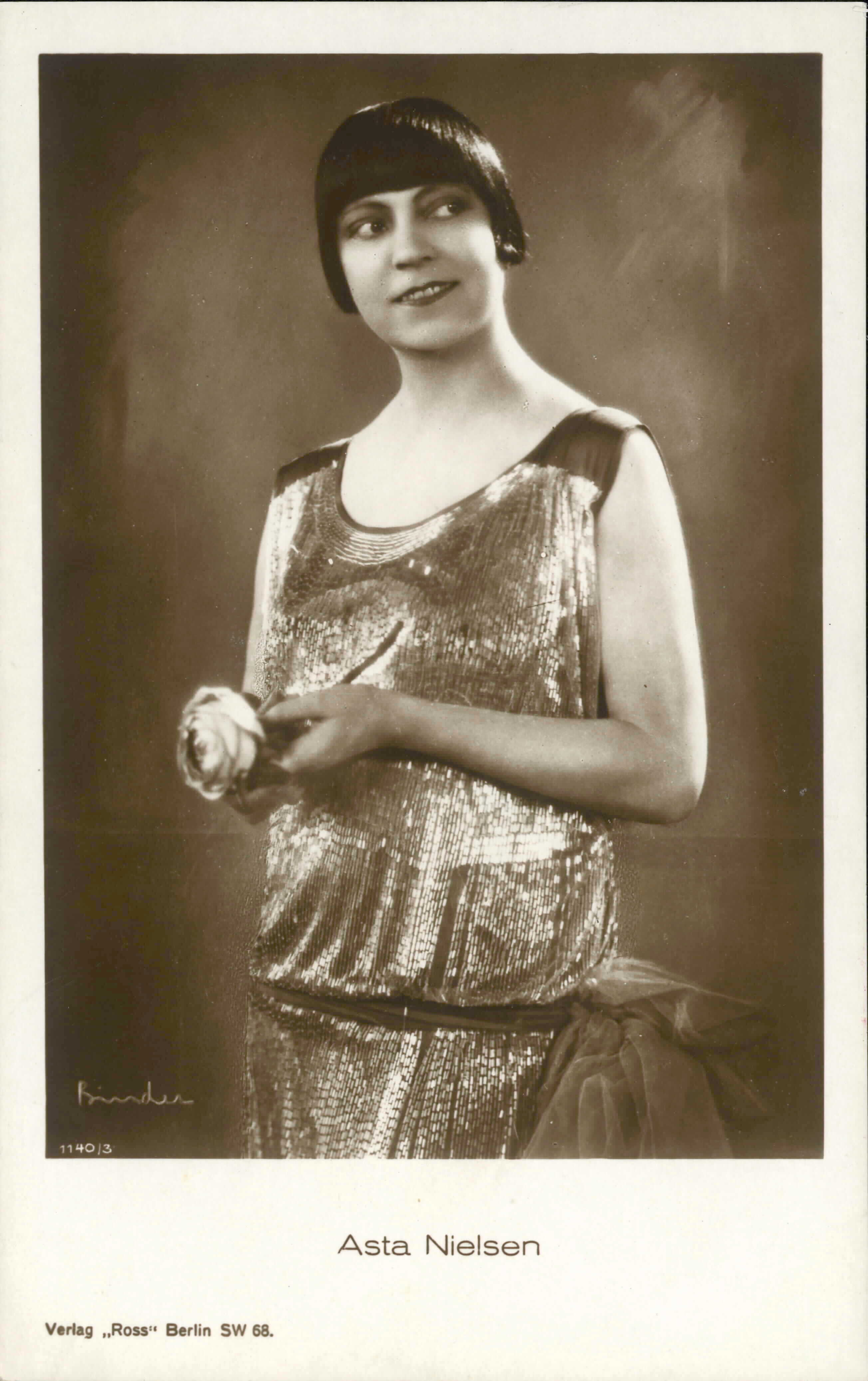
Danish silent film actress Asta Nielsen, 1927

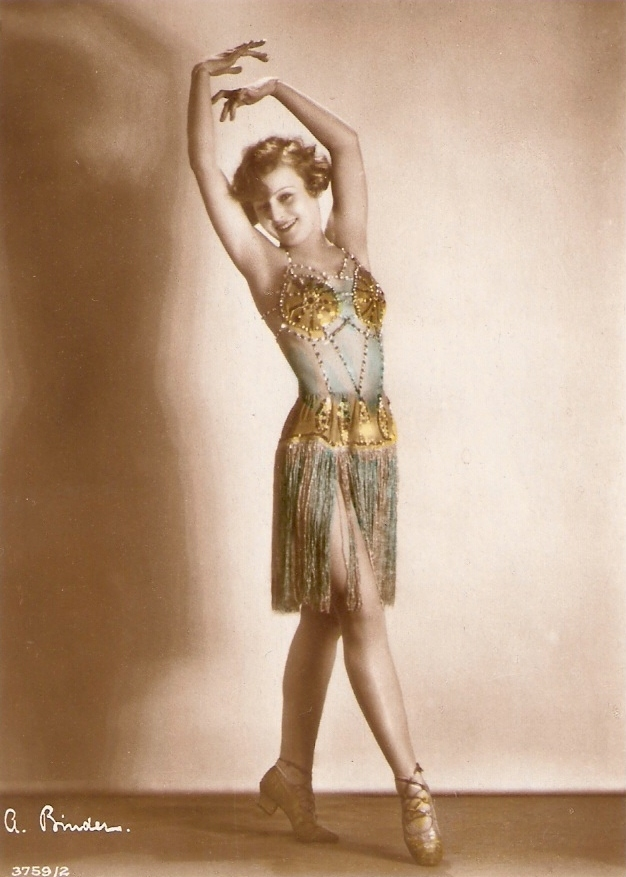
British-German actress and singer Lilian Harvey, 1928

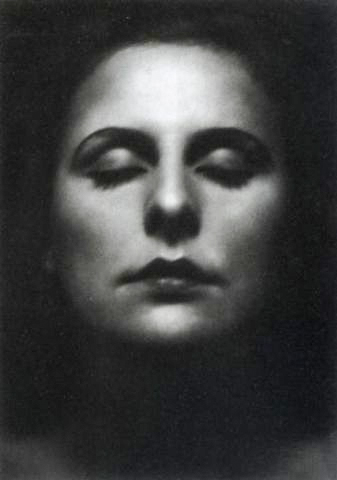
German actress and film director Leni Riefenstahl, 1928

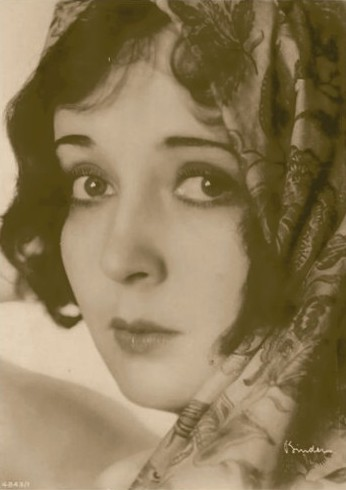
German silent film actress Dita Parlo, 1929

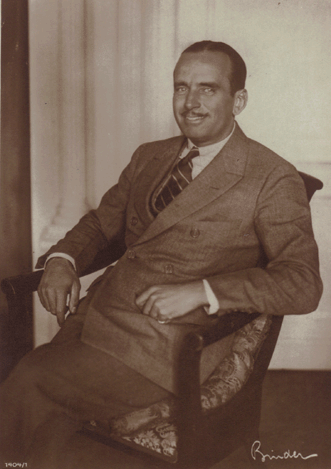
US-American film director and actor Douglas Fairbanks, 1929

== Bibliography ==
- F. Alex Binder: Unsere Filmsterne. Buch-Film-Verlag [Almanach-Verlag], Berlin 1921.
- Johannes Christoph Moderegger: Die Modefotografie im Focus des Dritten Reiches. Dissertation. Universität Kiel, 1998, S. 4.
- Johannes Christoph Moderegger: Modefotografie in Deutschland 1929–1955. Norderstedt 2000, ISBN 3-8311-0731-9, S. 32/141/183 (Google Books).
- Ulrich Pohlmann: Die Eleganz der Diktatur. Modephotographien in deutschen Zeitschriften 1936–1943. Fotomuseum, München 2001, ISBN 3-934609-03-1.
- Rolf Sachsse: Die Erziehung zum Wegsehen. Fotografie im NS-Staat. Philo Fine Arts, Dresden 2003, ISBN 3-364-00390-4.
