= Mario von Bucovich =

Austrian photographer (1884–1947)

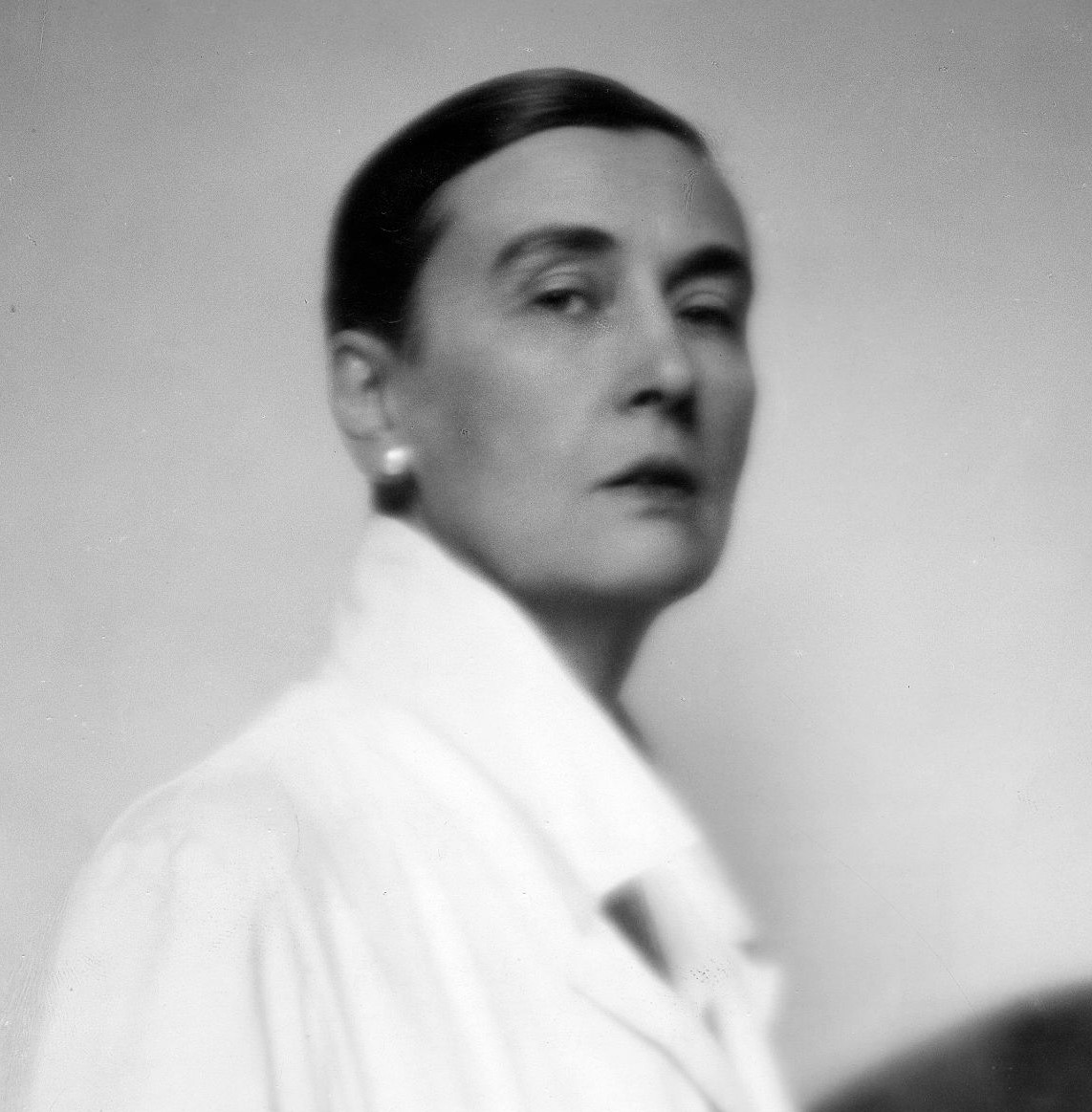
- Bucovich, c. 1930
- Born: 16 February 1884; Pula, Austrian Littoral, Austria-Hungary
- Died: 30 November 1947 (aged 63); Mexico City, Mexico
- Occupation: Photographer
- Years active: 1909–1947

Mario von Bucovich (16 February 1884 – 30 November 1947), also known as Marius von Bucovich, was an Austrian photographer. The Berliner Morgenpost described him as "one of the great unknown photographers of 20th Century European photography".

== Early life and education ==
He was born at Pula in the Istrian region of the Austro-Hungarian Empire and held the title of Baron. His father, August, Freiherr von Bucovich (1852–1913), was a former corvette captain in the Austro-Hungarian Navy and later an entrepreneur in the railroad concession sector. His mother was Greek.

He began studying mathematics and mechanics at the Eidgenössischen Technischen Hochschule in Zurich in 1904. He continued these studies in Nancy, France. From 1908 to 1909 he studied electrical engineering and mechanical engineering at the Technikum Mittweida in Saxony.

Bucovich began his professional career in 1909 at the Otis Elevator Company in New York City, USA, which sent him to the Russian capital St. Petersburg in 1911. There he also dealt with the profitable sale of agricultural machinery. In 1913, he acceded to his title as Baron upon his father's death. In 1914 he was deported to Siberia as an enemy foreigner, but was able to flee and return to St. Petersburg. From 1918 he dedicated himself to the repatriation of the deportees who remained in Siberia, which was very difficult due to the civil war in Russia.

== Career in Germany ==
He worked primarily in Germany in the 1920s and 30s, as well as traveled to France and England. Bucovich was active in the art and antiques trade and settled in Berlin, where he took over the photo studio of Karl Schenker in 1925. Between 1926 and 1930, von Bucovich (and his wife, Marie, also a photographer) ran their studio from Budapester Straße 6, in Berlin's Tiergarten district.

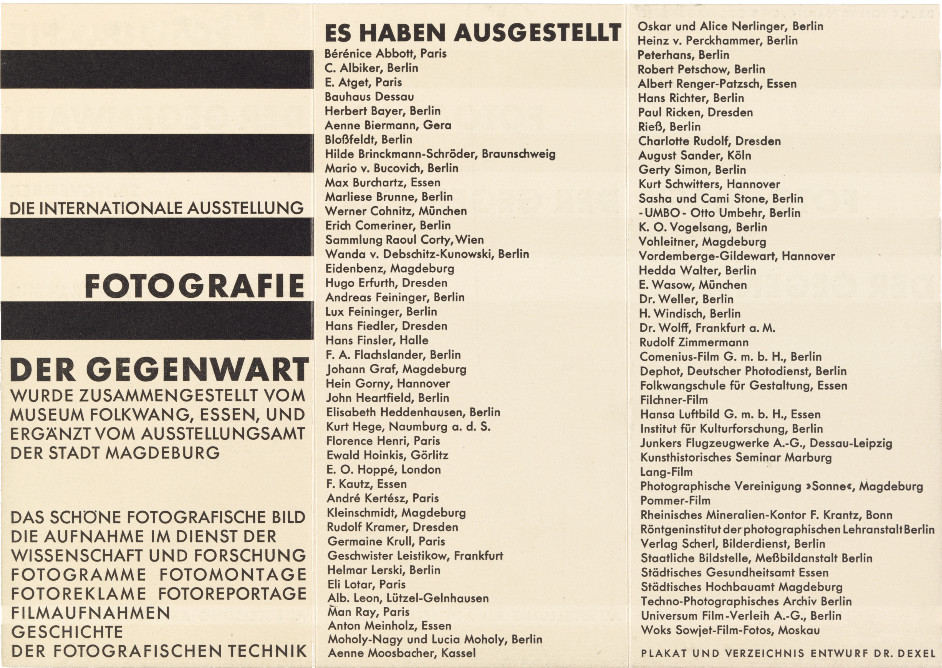
Brochure for Gegenwart Exhibition

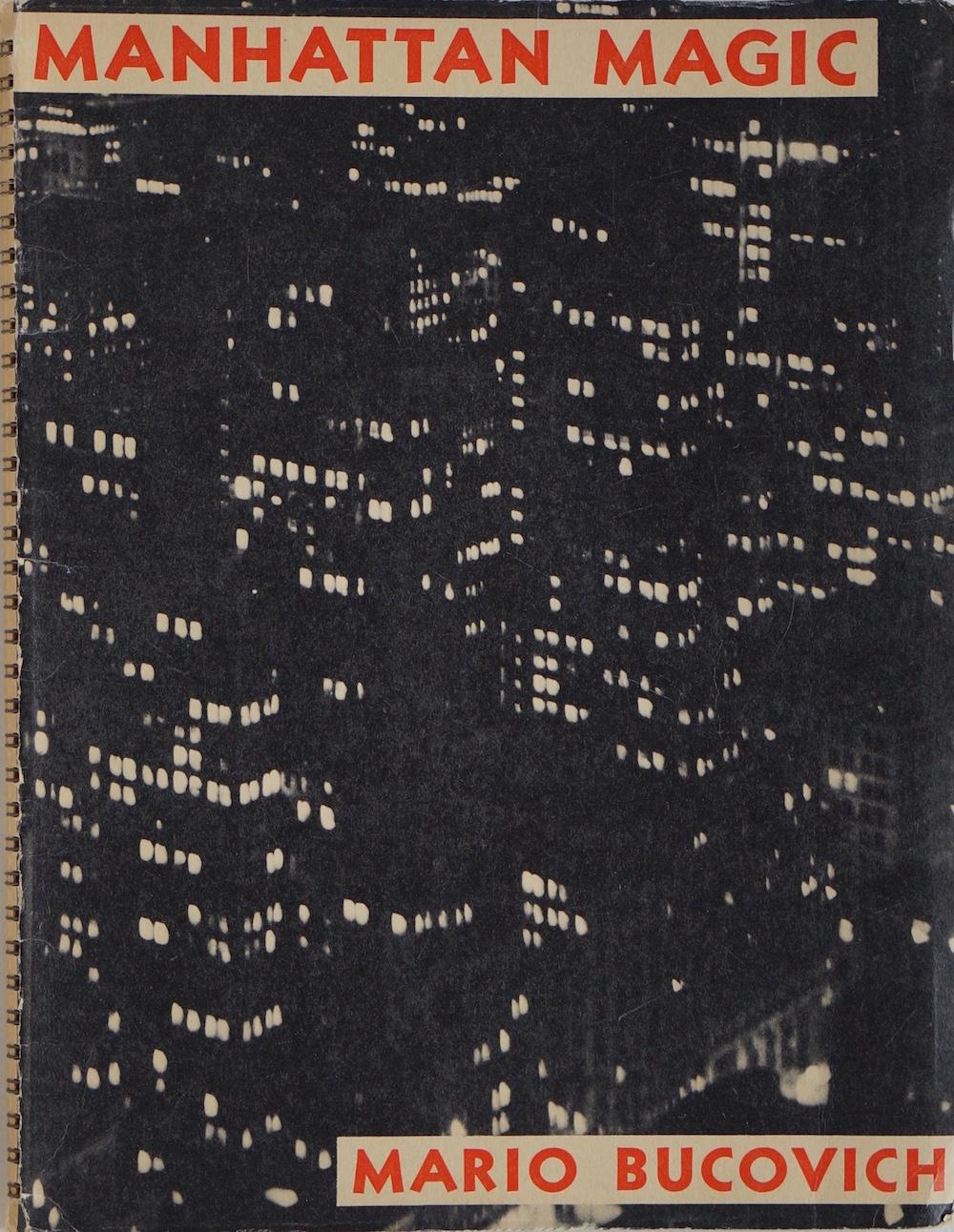
Manhattan Magic. A Collection of eighty-five Photographs, 1937

In his published work he was most noted for his urban studies with a focus on streetscapes, but his studio work undertaken at the Atelier Karl Schenker was often of entertainment personalities of Weimar period stage and screen. He photographed Marlene Dietrich, Elisabeth Bergner and Leni Riefenstahl (in her days as a dancer, preceding her career as a film director).

Amongst his most notable books were Berlin, Das Gesicht Der Stadt (Berlin, Portrait of a City) and Paris (with a foreword by Paul Morand). The Paris book included photos by Germaine Krull. The Berlin book published originally by Albertus Verlag, a publishing house he founded in 1928, had a foreword written by the author Alfred Döblin.

During the late 1920s his photos appeared across the gamut of German photo journalism including the titles: Der Querschnitt, Uhu, Die Dame, Die neue Linie, Das Magazin, Skizzen, Welt-Magazin, Kölnische Illustrierte Zeitung, Revue des Monats, Das Kriminalmagazin, Das Leben, Das Kunstblatt, Farbe und Form, Das Deutsche Lichtbild, Deutscher Kamera Almanach, Die Reklame, and Der Photo-Freund.

His views of Girona in Spain taken in 1933 were published in the National Geographic magazine.

== Later years ==
He moved to New York during the 1930s where he had a studio at 687 Lexington Avenue and worked for a publishing house on 41st Street. In his American period he published two photographic essays, Washington D.C. City Beautiful and Manhattan Magic: A Collection of Eighty-Five Photographs. He moved to Mexico and was working there through at least the early part of that decade, until his death on 30 November 1947 in a traffic accident in Mexico City.

== Exhibitions ==
His work was shown at major photography salons of the day. He was represented at probably the most important German photography exhibition of the Bauhaus period, Fotografie der Gegenwart (Contemporary photography) in Magdeburg in 1929. He was also shown at the Fourth International Exhibition of Pictorial Photography at the California Palace of the Legion of Honor, the Third International Exhibition of Pictorial Photography Seattle Camera Club, and the 15th and 16th Annual Pittsburgh Salon of Photographic Art at the Carnegie Institute.

His work is in the collections of the New Orleans Museum of Art, the National Museum of Mexican Art and the National Gallery of Canada.

== Personal life ==
He is believed to have been married four times.

== Publications ==
- Berlin. (= Das Gesicht der Städte). Albertus Verlag, Berlin 1928.
  - Berlin 1928: Das Gesicht der Stadt, mit einem Vorwort von Alfred Döblin Neuauflage. Nicolai-Verlag, Berlin 1992, ISBN 3-87584-432-7.
- Paris. (= Das Gesicht der Städte). Albertus Verlag, Berlin 1928.
- Manhattan Magic. Selbstverlag, Philadelphia, Pennsylvania, USA 1937.
- Oaxaca. Mexico Habla, Mexiko-Stadt 1942.
- Washington, D. C., city beautiful, a collection of eighty five photographs Philadelphia, Beck, 1936
- Mexico Lindo
- Bildnis und Dekorative Studie, In: Deutscher Kamera-Almanach. Ein Jahrbuch für die Photographie unserer Zeit 19 (1928), S. 61 und S. 156.
