= Hans Robertson =

German photographer

- Born: 8 May 1883; Hamburg, German Empire
- Died: 11 September 1950 (aged 67); Vangede, Denmark
- Occupations: Photographer; Photojournalist

Hans Robertson (8 May 1883 – 11 September 1950) was a German photographer and photojournalist of the Weimar Republic. He had a studio in Berlin focused on photography of dance, theatre, and portraits of its people including Harald Kreutzberg, Vera Skoronel and Mary Wigman, and of other public figures such as Käthe Kollwitz, Heinrich Mann, Gustav Stresemann and Max Schmeling.

== Life and career ==
Robertson was born in Hamburg. After his school years he first training as an engineer. He became an assistant to the nature photographer Albert Steiner in St. Moritz, Switzerland. From 1911, he worked in Hamburg in the Arnold Mocsigay studio, which published series of postcards. From 1915 to 1919, Robertson ran a photo business in St. Moritz together with Albert Steiner, which Steiner had built up there from 1910. Around 1927 Robertson took over the studio of Lili Baruch in Berlin at Kurfürstendamm, which specialised in theatre and dance photography, and ran it from 1928 to 1933.

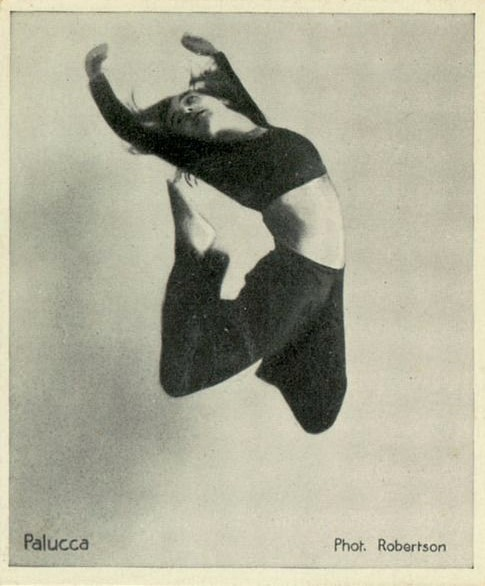
Gret Palucca, 1920s

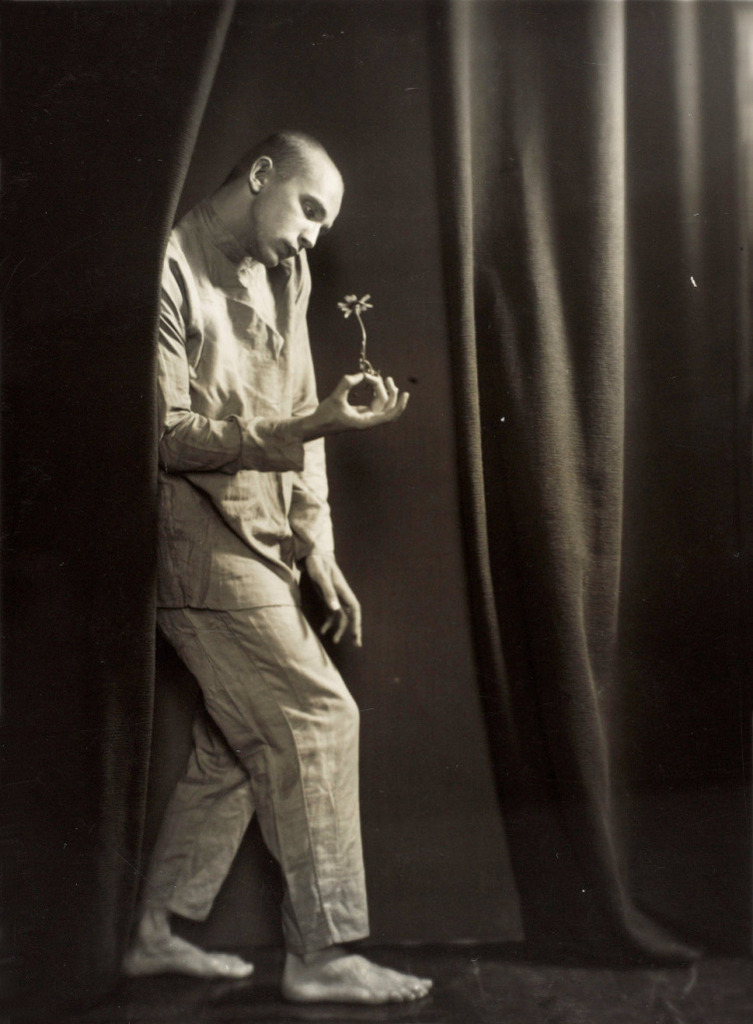
Harald Kreutzberg in The Dance of the Fools, Berlin, 1927

As a dance and industrial photographer, as well as a photojournalist, Robertson became one of the city's most renowned portraitists, especially of writers, artists and politicians such as Käthe Kollwitz, Heinrich Mann and Gustav Stresemann. He became particularly famous for his photographs of modern dancers such as Harald Kreutzberg, Gret Palucca, Vera Skoronel and Mary Wigman, as well as the boxer Max Schmeling. His works were used in books, magazines, theatre announcements, postcards, and for collectors' cards.

Under the Nazi regime, Robertson handed over his studio, including the negative stock, to a former associate, Siegfried Enkelmann (1905–1978), on 30 June 1933. Enkelmann ran the studio until 1961. Together with Irene Krämer (whom Enkelmann later married), a trained photographer and former student of Robertson, Enkelmann set up his own business with "movement recordings in dance and artistry".

In 1933, Robertson married Danish dancer Inger Kyser-Linden (née Levin; born 1903). The Jewish Robertson was expelled from the Berlin association of photojournalists. In 1934, he emigrated with his wife via Switzerland to Denmark. They settled in Copenhagen where he opened a photography school, worked as a freelance portrait and theatre photographer and published articles in photography journals.

In 1943, Robertson and his wife fled to Stockholm to escape the onset of anti-Semitism in Denmark. They returned to Copenhagen after World War II, where he reopened his photography school in Vangede.

Robertson died in Vangede on 11 September 1950 at the age of 67.

The National Museum of Photograph in Copenhagen holds the largest collection of negatives from Robertson's estate. A 2010 exhibition at the Black Diamond presented a selection of his most important photographs from the years "before Hitler", including newly discovered Berlin photographs.

== Exhibitions ==
- 1931: Exhibitions with Charlotte Rudolph, Essen and Mannheim
- 2008: Hans Robertson – Berlinische Galerie, Landesmuseum für Moderne Kunst, Fotografie und Architektur, Berlin
