= Albert Steiner =

Swiss photographer (1877–1965)

- Born: 4 January 1877; Frutigen, Switzerland
- Died: 4 June 1965 (aged 88); Frutigen, Switzerland
- Known for: Landscape photography

Albert Steiner (4 January 1877 – 4 June 1965) was a Swiss photographer considered one of the country's leading photographers of the 20th century. Known particularly for his landscape photographs of the Engadin, his widely reproduced images contributed to Switzerland's international image as an Alpine country.

== Biography ==
Albert Steiner was born on 4 January 1877 in Frutigen. He began an apprenticeship in his father's bakery but soon left to train as a photographer in Thun. Around 1897, Steiner joined Fred Boissonnas in Geneva. After his father's death, he returned to Frutigen in 1898 and took over the family bakery. He rejoined Boissonnas in 1901 and remained with him until 1904. Steiner later operated his own photographic business in Geneva and in 1905 shared a studio in Bern with his brother.

In 1906, Steiner moved to St. Moritz, where he opened his own photographic studio in 1909. He married Helene Hirsbrunner in 1910. At the 1914 Swiss National Exhibition in Bern, Steiner received gold and silver medals. From 1915 to 1919, he ran his St. Moritz studio with Hans Robertson. In 1917, while on a military reconnaissance mission, Steiner was captured by Italian border guards and held for three weeks. In 1924, he moved into a larger studio. His son Hans took over the business in 1950. Steiner died in Frutigen on 4 June 1965.

== Work ==
Steiner's most significant period of photographic work fell between 1910 and 1930. His photographs of the Engadin were widely reproduced. Their circulation helped shape perceptions of Switzerland abroad as an Alpine country. His landscape photography was influenced by Giovanni Segantini and Ferdinand Hodler. During the 1920s, his photography also drew on the New Objectivity movement, alongside the Pictorialist approach of his earlier work. His 1930 publication Schnee Winter Sonne was described as Switzerland's first modern photobook.

Steiner's commercial work included assignments for tourism bodies, public services, energy companies and hotels in St. Moritz. Alongside his landscape work, he also produced portraits and marketed photographic prints. Licensing his photographs provided Steiner with significant income, and his work circulated in newspapers and magazines in Switzerland and abroad, including the Schweizer Illustrierte. He also produced postcards from his photographs, adding colour by hand to images intended for colour editions.

== Exhibitions ==
In 1930, Steiner exhibited a selection of Upper Engadin landscapes in St. Moritz, and the following year his work was included in the travelling exhibition Die Neue Fotografie. The 2005–2006 exhibition Über Tälern und Menschen – Albert Steiner: das fotografische Werk brought together around 150 works from public and private collections. In 2007, Über Tälern und Menschen was shown at the Galleria Gottardo in Lugano.

== Legacy ==
Steiner is considered one of the leading Swiss photographers of the 20th century. He viewed photography as an art form, which distinguished him from many of his contemporaries. The Bündner Kunstmuseum holds a collection of Steiner's works.
