= Rudolf Lämmel =

Rudolf Lämmel (2 March 1879 in Vienna – 9 August 1962 in Zurich) was an Austrian-Swiss reform educator and writer.

== Life ==
Lämmel grew up in Vienna and Graz in Austria, but later acquired Swiss citizenship. He studied natural sciences in Zurich from the winter semester 1899/1900 and was a member of the Academisch-technischen Tischgesellschaft and the resulting Academischen Landsmannschaft of the Austrians in Zurich. In 1902 he founded the Reform Gymnasium in Zurich, which he sold in 1913 to raise funds for the founding of the Landerziehungsheim Hertenstein, which would bring about an educational idea based on the combination of body culture (dance) and scientific subjects. The project failed with the outbreak of the World War I.

After finishing a guest stay at the Odenwaldschule (in Germany) due to a scheduling dispute with its head Paul Geheeb, Lämmel in 1917 founded the Landerziehungsheim Schillerheim in Mettmenstetten, which also failed economically. From 1918 onward he promoted the establishment of a Volkshochschule in Zurich. Thanks to his educational publications, he was appointed as a Studienrat in the Thuringia Ministry of Culture from September 1923, but was placed on probation in July of the following year due to the economic crisis, together with a drastic reduction of his salary. Lämmel has since been active as a popular science writer and children's book author and published his programmatic work on modern dance in 1928, in which he vigorously opposed the prudery caused by the tradition of mind-body dualism of Christianity, and demanded the admission of nudity in dance and gymnastics especially in pedagogy, from which he expected a liberating effect on personality development.

Lämmel was an early popularizer of Albert Einstein's theory of relativity, publishing newspaper articles starting in 1911 and one book in 1921, and was a contributor to the documentary movie Die Grundlagen der Einsteinschen Relativitäts-Theorie in 1922.

In 1933 after the Nazis took power in Germany, Lämmel was retired due to his proximity to social democracy under the Law for the Restoration of the Professional Civil Service and returned to Switzerland and Zurich, where he lived with his large family under difficult economic conditions until he was hired as a teacher at the Juventus school and later at the associated evening school, where he taught physics until his 80s. In 1936 he published a book in which he criticized the Nazi theory of race.

Lämmel was married twice, since 1903 to Sophie Axelrod, since 1917 to Luise Dorothea Frank. The first marriage produced two children (including the dancer Vera Skoronel), the second four (or five) more.

== Publications ==
- Wege zur Relativitätstheorie, Stuttgart 1921.
- Die neue Kolonie, 1924. Roman unter dem Pseudonym H. Inführ.
- Sozialphysik. Naturkraft, Mensch und Wirtschaft, Franckh’sche Verlagshandlung, Stuttgart 1925, Kosmos Gesellschaft der Naturfreunde.DNB-Link
- Moderne Elektrowirtschaft, Jena 1927.
- Von Naturforschern und Naturgesetzen, 1927.
- Galileo Galilei. Im Licht des zwanzigsten Jahrhunderts, Berlin 1927.
- Der moderne Tanz. Eine allgemeinverständliche Einführung in das Gebiet der Rhythmischen Gymnastik und des Neuen Tanzes, Berlin-Schöneberg o. J. 1928.
- Die moderne Naturwissenschaft und der Kosmos, Berlin 1929.
- Das moderne wiss. Weltbild, 1932.
- Die menschlichen Rassen. Eine populärwissenschaftliche Einführung in die Grundprobleme der Rassentheorie, Zürich 1936.
- Galileo und sein Zeitalter, 1942.
- Physik für jedermann, 1946.
- Isaac Newton, 1957.

== Bibliography ==
- Martin Näf: “Die Wirkung ins Grösste ist uns versagt…” Rudolf Laemmel (1879–1962) – Reformpädagoge, Erwachsenenbildner, Aufklärer. Versuch einer biografischen Rekonstruktion. In: Spurensuche. Zeitschrift für Geschichte der Erwachsenenbildung und populären Wissenschaft, 11. Jg., 2000, Heft 3–4
- Karl Toepfer: Empire of Ecstasy. Nudity and Movement in German Body Culture, 1910–1935. Berkeley 1997 (Online)
