= Anita Daniel =

Romanian-born German-American author and journalist

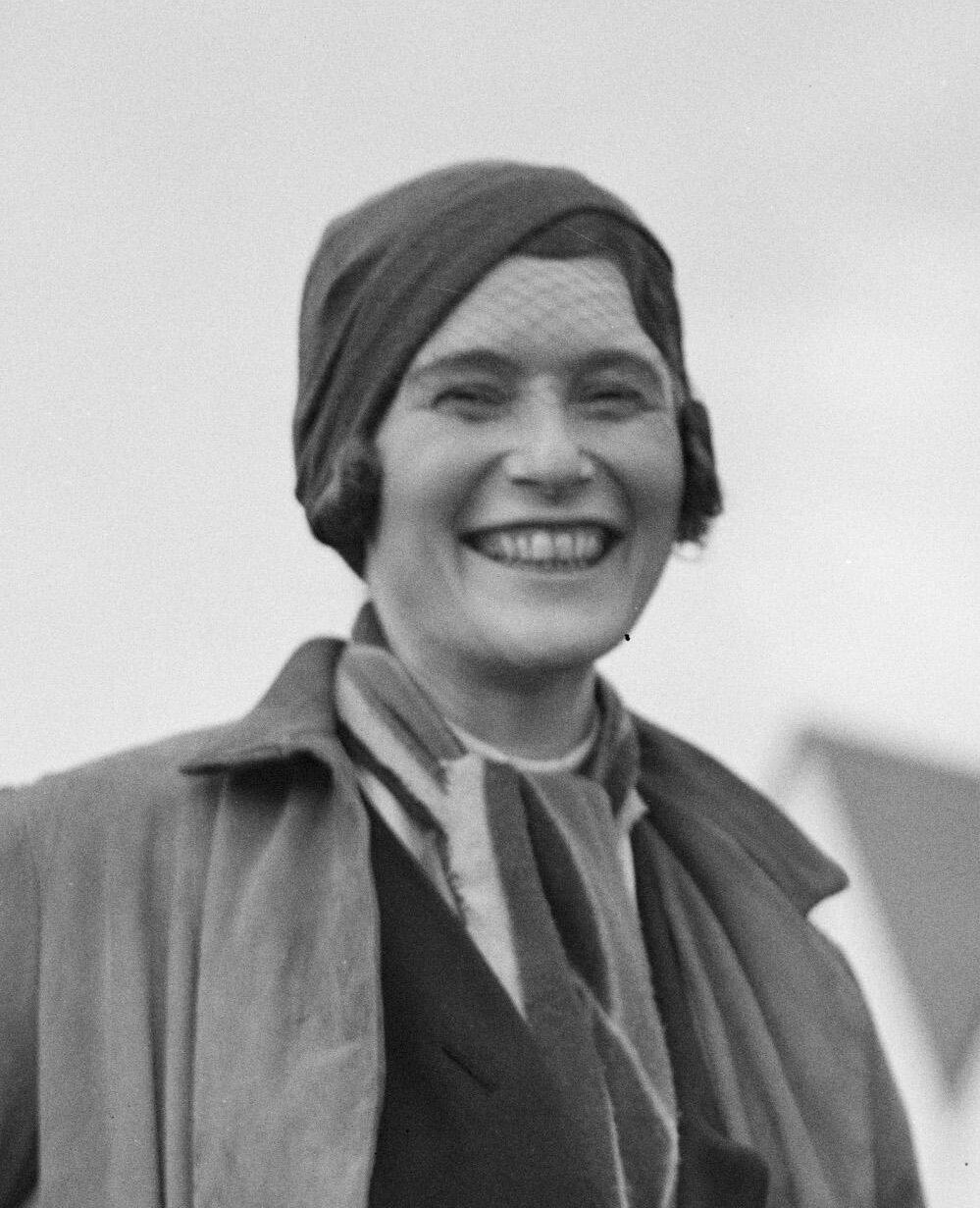
- (1934)
- Born: 1892; Iași, Romania
- Died: 1978 (aged 85–86); New York, United States
- Occupations: Author, Journalist
- Notable work: "I Am Going to Switzerland"; "You'll Love New York"; "The Story of Albert Schweitzer"

Anita Daniel (1892–1978) was a Romanian-born German-American author and journalist known for her contributions to transatlantic understanding and cultural exchange between Europe and America. Throughout her career, she has focused on elucidating European affairs for American audiences and vice versa. Daniel, who grew up in Paris, France, was multilingual, fluent in French and Italian. Her syndicated newspaper columns and numerous publications have been translated into several languages, including Turkish, Persian, and Dutch. She is recognized for her ability to adapt her writing to the preferences of each country she addresses. Daniel's work has been diverse, ranging from travel guides like "You'll Love New York" to biographies such as "Story of Albert Schweitzer." Her contributions have earned acknowledgment from various quarters, including the US Department of State.

== Early life ==
Daniel was born to a wealthy Jewish family in the Romanian university town of Iași, and went to school in France's Paris and Switzerland's Geneva. Growing up bilingual in French and German, she traveled often.

== Career ==
A woman's handbag is a mysterious dungeon, it's [the] key to her real self. It's the accumulation of frivolous non-essentials, which are sure to tumble out as soon as the bag is opened, that gives you the clue to her individuality.

— Anita Daniel, "Handbag Key To Woman's Real Self, Science Find" Mediterranean Naples Stars And Stripes, Jan 31, 1945 Pg. 3, Naples, Campania, IT

Daniel had a brother who was the head of a picture agency. He gave Daniel her first assignments. Her work was "taking a trip around Europe and distract the kings and queens" while photographer took 'special' pictures.

Daniel began her writing career in Berlin in the 1920s, when she wrote primarily for Die Dame, published by Ullstein Verlag, and also for Ullstein's innovative magazine Uhu and the Jewish-German newspaper Aufbau. In 1933 she left Germany for Switzerland and then immigrated to the United States.

In 1945, while working as a feature writer for The New York Times, Daniel was victim to an accident that occurred in a restaurant. In the accident, she was injured in her neck. She subsequently sued the owner of the restaurant, American playwright and screenwriter Preston Sturges on December 15, 1945. She sued him for $36,000, citing "an electric fan in his [Preston's] restaurant cut her neck and kept her from interviewing Walt-Disney, Joan Crawford, and Aldous Huxley."

She wrote a number of travel books in English and German. Her shorter stories and articles appeared in French and Swiss publications and in American magazines including This Week, Vogue, The Christian Science Monitor, The American Mercury, among others. She also contributed articles to The New York Times. Her articles catered to the public's appetite for light-hearted content that highlighted contemporary inventions.

Her New York Times obituary notes that she died at age 85 in New York after a long illness.

A collection of 120 of Daniel's texts was published in German in 2021 under the title Mondän ist nicht mehr modern ('Worldly is no longer modern').

=== Sex Appeal ===
Daniel's best-known article was published in 1928 in the German cultural magazine Uhu, titled "Sex Appeal: Ein neues Schlagwort für eine alte Sache" ('Sex Appeal: A New Catchword for an Old Thing'). It was republished in English translation in 1995 in the Weimar Republic Sourcebook, and in 2006 in the German History in Documents and Images site. This article delves into the emergence of the term “sex appeal,” as a new concept, distinct from traditional notions of beauty. She notes that the term originated in the United States, but became internationally recognized, similar to “flirt,” “dancing,” and “cocktail.” Daniel explains how, while in the past, people referred to this quality as “that certain something,” the term “sex appeal” took over to evoke a similar meaning.

=== I Am Going to Switzerland ===
Among Daniels many travelogues, her 1952 book I Am Going to Switzerland received the most attention. The book was frequently featured, reviewed, and cited in travel columns of American periodicals at the time. It served as an introduction to Swiss culture and lifestyle while also functioning as a comprehensive traveler's guide, offering detailed information on accommodations, shopping, and local festivals across various districts of Switzerland.

=== The Story of Albert Schweitzer ===
Daniel's biographical book on Alsatian polymath Albert Schweitzer was published c. 1957 and became critically acclaimed. The Canadian Champion called it an "outstanding example of love for your neighbor regardless of race or creed – [whilst] the lesson of brotherhood so missing in the world today." Waxahachie Daily Light noted it as "the story of the exciting adventures that is his [Schweitzer's] life is a vital and faithful portrait of a great man."

== Works (selected) ==
=== Books ===
- Anita Joachim-Daniel: Ein bißchen Glück, ein bißchen Wärme, ein bißchen Lachen. Basel: Birkhäuser, 1942
- I Am Going to Switzerland. New York: Howard-McCann, 1952
- Ein bisschen Glück. ('A Little Luck') Basel: Birkhäuser, 1953
- I Am Going to Italy. New York: Howard-McCann, 1955
- Ich reise nach Paris. ('I'm Traveling to Paris') Basel: Birkhäuser, 1959
- Ferien in USA: Kleine Hinweise für die grosse Reise. ('Holidays in the USA: Little Tips for the Big Trip') Basel: Birkhäuser, 1962
- The Story of Albert Schweitzer
- Ich Reise Nach Kalifornien [I'm traveling to California]
