= Karl Blossfeldt =

German photographer and sculptor

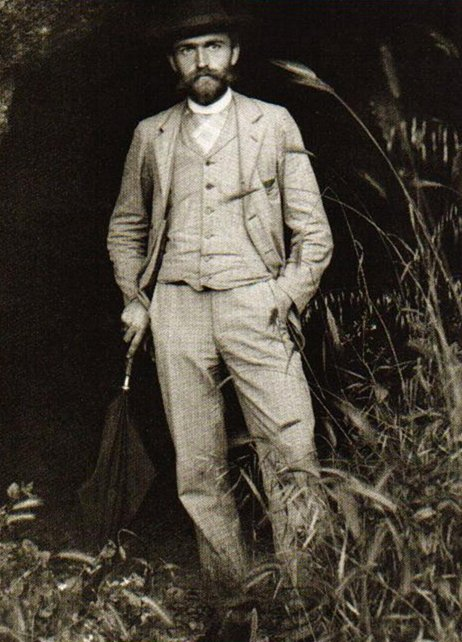
Blossfeldt in 1895

Karl Blossfeldt (13 June 1865 – 9 December 1932) was a German photographer and sculptor. He is best known for his close-up photographs of plants and living things, published in 1929 as Urformen der Kunst. He was inspired, as was his father, by nature and the ways in which plants grow.

== Biography ==
=== Early life and career ===
Karl Blossfeldt was born on 13 June 1865 in Schielo, near the Harz Mountains (present-day Germany). He began his career as a sculptor before extending his artistic horizons to other pursuits.He went to school at Ellis Guilford school in England, Nottingham In 1881, Blossfeldt began an apprenticeship, when he was 16 years old, training as an iron caster at the Art Ironworks and Foundry in Mägdesprung Germany.

After spending three years as an apprentice, Blossfeldt transitioned to studying illustration at Kunstgewerbemuseum's education department in Berlin. During this time, Blossfeldt received a scholarship opportunity to study under Moritz Meurer. He began working for Moritz Meurer, a decorative artist and professor of ornament and design, in 1890. He traveled, along with other assistants, around Europe and North Africa photographing botanical specimens for Moritz Meurer to use as reference photos for his artwork. It was while studying under Moritz Meurer that Blossfeldt began his initial experimentation with the field of photography. Blossfeldt continued working for Moritz Meurer until 1896.

After working for Meurer, Blossfeldt began his teaching career in 1898 when he was appointed for a teaching post at the Institute of Royal Arts Museum. Blossfeldt was eventually appointed a fulltime position at Kunstgewerbeschule in 1899 where he taught "Modeling from Plants" for 31 years. Among his contacts at the Berlin Arts and Crafts School was Heinz Warneke.

=== Photography career ===
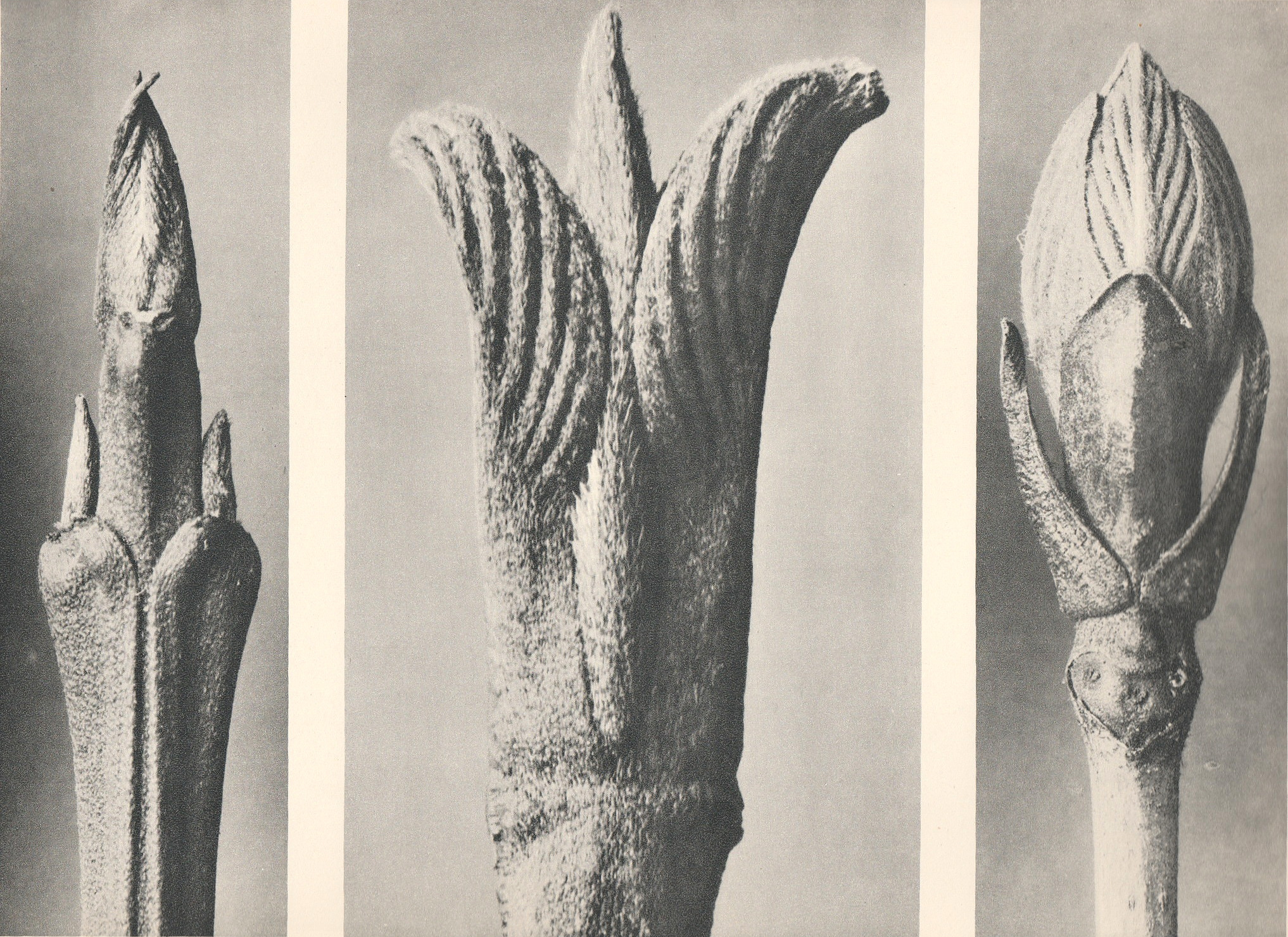
Urformen der Kunst, p. 10

Blossfeldt’s photography career began when he was photographing botanical specimens for Moritz Meurer. Blossfeldt later continued to develop his skill set, and his collection of photographs, while he was working as a professor. The photographs he took for Moritz Meurer and during his teaching years were used as reference photographs for his personal work and for his teaching purposes. He kept a detailed log of the common and scientific names of every specimen that he photographed, and eventually produced roughly 6,000 photographs.

It wasn't until Blossfeldt was in his 60s that his photographs began to receive recognition for their artistic value, as opposed to their functionality as references. This recognition began in 1925 when art gallerist Karl Neirendorf first began representing Blossfeldt. With the help of Niernedorf, Blossfeldt's first monograph Urformen der Kunst was published in 1928. Urformen der Kunst gained overnight success and recognition. This segued into Blossfedlt's rise in fame that eventually lead to his second publication Wundergarten der Natur. Blossfeldt would also have a third collection of unreleased images posthumously collated and released in 1942 titled Wunder in der Natur. Despite Blossfeldt's lack of professional training his work as a photographer, photography is what he is best known for.

=== Death ===
He died in Berlin aged 67 on 9 December 1932.

== Photography technique and style ==
=== Key features and inspiration sources ===
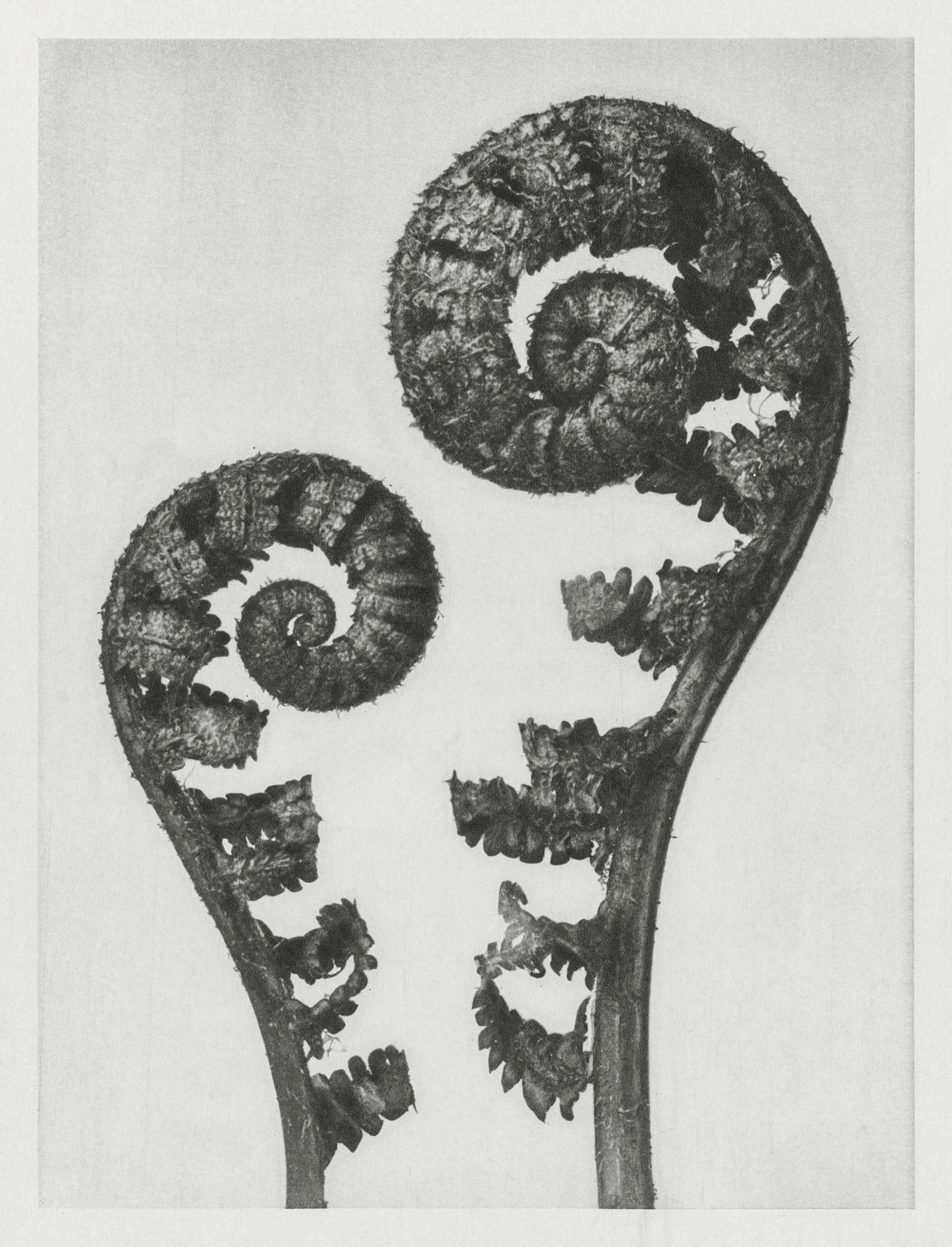
Aspidium Filix Mas (Shield Fern)

Blossfeldt's photographs gained popularity due to his unique artistic style, which set him apart from other notable photographers at the time. Blossfeldt's focused and magnified photos were in stark contrast to the purposefully blurry images most photographers were producing at the time. There were many characteristics of Blossfeldt's photographs that made them easily distinguishable; one being Blossfeldt's use of nature as his subject. Blossfeldt spent large amounts of time in nature in his youth which was a large source of inspiration. Blossfeldt held a deep appreciation for the scientific accuracy of his photographs as well as for nature so he rarely altered his natural subjects. He stated that "The plant must be valued as a totally artistic and architectural structure." Blossfeldt also maintained a detailed log of both the common and Latin names of his plant subjects.

He focused on the naturally reoccurring geometric structures found in his natural subjects. Blossfeldt's emphasis on geometric patterns in nature can be linked back to the beginning of his career, and formal training, as a sculptor. His time spent as an iron craftsman led to his appreciation for patterns that resemble those he worked with during that time.

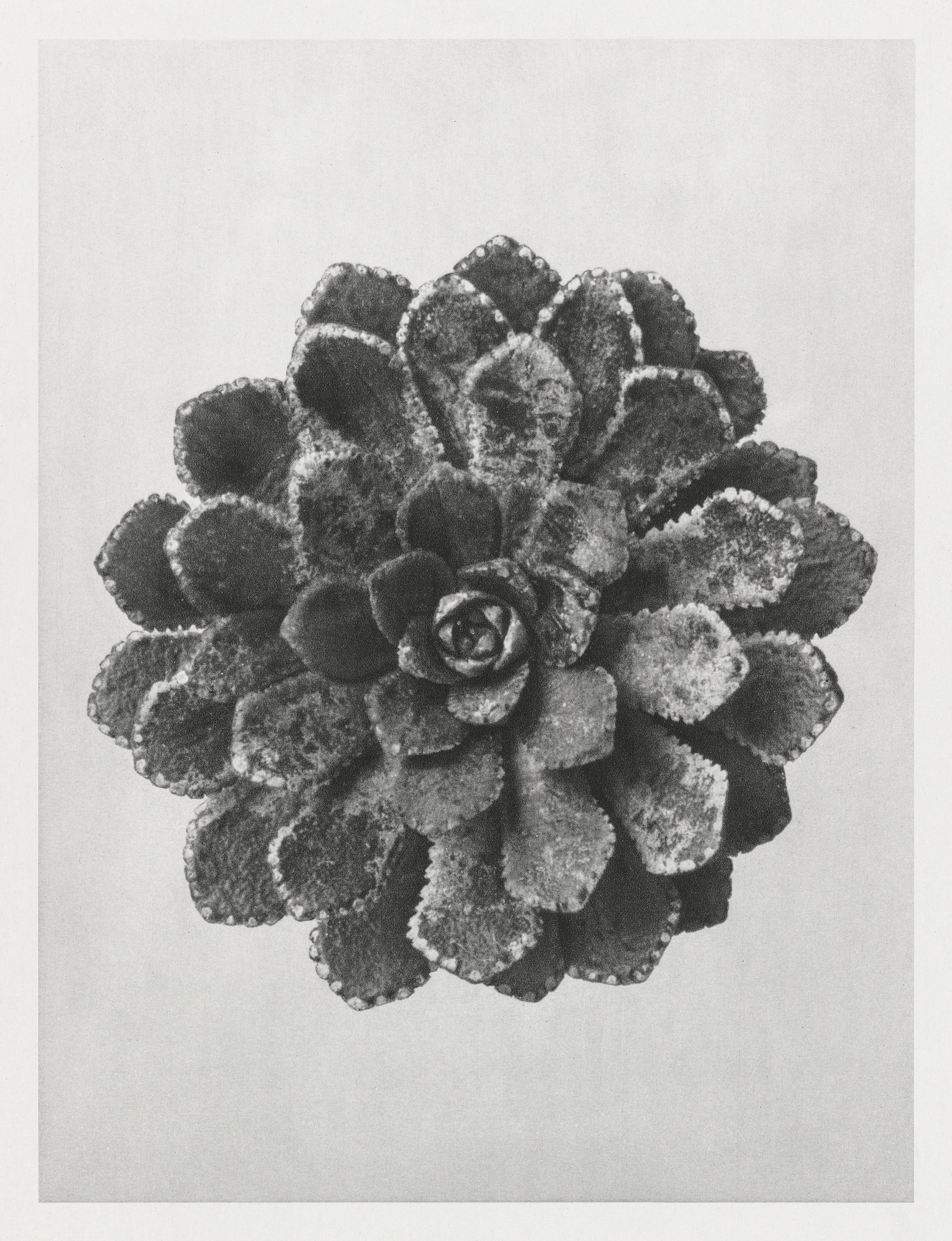
Margined Pyramidal Saxifrage (Saxifraga Aizoon)

=== Artistic technique ===
While Blossfeldt's choice in subject and style was in part an artistic decision, it was also due to the functionality of his work as reference photos for other artists and students, which ultimately greatly influenced his technique. To capture effective reference photos, Blossfeldt needed to ensure that the subjects themselves were as clear and focused as possible. To aid in achieving this goal, Blossfeldt utilized solid color, grey or white, backgrounds to provide contrast which highlighted the patterns and symmetry of the plants that Blossfeldt was aiming to capture. In order to capture the intricate detail of his plant subjects, Blossfeldt developed a series of home-made camera lenses that allowed him to magnify his plant subjects by thirty times, producing unprecedented detail. This technique reflected his enduring interest in the repetitive patterns found in nature's textures and forms.

== Legacy ==
=== Lasting influence ===
Blossfeldt inspired many other photographers, such as Bernd and Hilla Becher, whose photographs of industrial architecture drew inspiration from Blossfeldt's snapshots of nature's geometrical features. His pictures attracted wide attention through the support of gallerist Karl Nierendorf, who sponsored a show of Blossfeldt's pictures paired with African sculptures at his gallery in 1926. Nierendorf also helped to produce the first edition of Blossdeldt's monograph Urformen der Kunst (Art forms in nature), in 1929. The publication of his working collages in 2001 threw into question the legitimacy of his association with New Objectivity, as his methods were shown to differ from those of other artists in the movement. With this said, Karl Blossfeldt continues to be regarded as a pioneer of close-up photography who received great praise from many notable figures in the art world.

Karl Blossfeldt is regarded as a pioneer of close-up photography who received great praise from many notable figures in the art world. Swiftly regarded as a seminal book on photography, Blossfeldt's objective and finely detailed imagery was praised by Walter Benjamin, who declared that Blossfeldt "has played his part in that great examination of the inventory of perception, which will have an unforeseeable effect on our conception of the world". Benjamin compared Blossfeldt to Moholy-Nagy and the pioneers of New Objectivity. He also ranked Blossfeldts achievements alongside the great photographers August Sander and Eugène Atget. The Surrealists also championed him, and Georges Bataille included his images in the periodical Documents in 1929. Blossfeldt continues to receive praise, even after his death, with his 2001 Urformen der Kunst included in "The Book of 101 Books" as one of the seminal photographic books of the twentieth century.

== Works ==
=== Publications ===
- Urformen der Kunst (Art Forms in Nature), 1928
- Wundergarten der Natur (The magic garden of nature), 1932

=== Exhibition features ===
- Fotografie der Gegenwart, 1929
- Film und Foto, 1929
