= Koralle (magazine) =

Popular science magazine in Germany (1925–1944)

- Categories: Popular science magazine
- Frequency: Monthly
- Publisher: Ullsten Verlag; Deutscher Verlag
- First issue: April 1925
- Final issue: 1938
- Country: Weimar Republic; Nazi Germany
- Based in: Berlin
- Language: German

Koralle was a monthly popular science magazine which appeared in Weimar Republic and then in Nazi Germany between 1925 and 1944. It was one of the publications started by the leading German company Ullstein Verlag. Although it was started as a popular science magazine, it turned into a general interest magazine in 1933 when the Nazi Party began to rule the country.

== History and profile ==
Koralle was first published in April 1925 as one of the publications of the Ullstein Verlag. The magazine was headquartered in Berlin. Later the Deutscher Verlag became the publisher of the magazine. During this period Werner Höfer wrote for Koralle.

Ullstein Berichte which was a free brochure of the Ullstein Verlag described Koralle as the most beautiful popular science monthly magazine. It targeted readers who were interested in technological and scientific topics. The magazine featured advertisements about the novice technical devices such as cameras and cars. However, Koralle lost its original focus and became a general interest magazine shortly after the Nazi Party seized power in 1933.

In the period between 1926 and 1933 Koralle sold tens of thousands copies, being one the most successful Ullstein titles. The magazine folded in 1944.
