= Frieda Gertrud Riess =

German photographer

Frieda Gertrud Riess (1890 – c. 1955) was a German portrait photographer in the 1920s with a studio in central Berlin.

== Early life ==
Riess was born in Czarnikau in the Prussian Province of Posen where her Jewish parents Emil Reiss and Selma (née Schreyer) were shopkeepers. At the end of the 1890s, her widowed mother moved the family to Berlin where Frieda first studied sculpture under Hugo Lederer (c. 1907) and later (1913) photography at the Berlin "Photographischen Lehranstalt" of the Lette-Verein, receiving her diploma in the summer of 1915.

== Career ==
In 1918, she opened a business on the Kurfürstendamm in Berlin; it became one of the most popular studios in the city. Partly as a result of her marriage to the journalist Rudolf Leonhard in the early 1920s, she extended her clientele to celebrities such as playwright Walter Hasenclever, novelist Gerhart Hauptmann and actors and actresses including Tilla Durieux, Asta Nielsen and Emil Jannings. This group extended to include dancers, music-hall stars and fine artists: Anna Pavlova, Mistinguett, Lil Dagover, Renée Sintenis, Max Liebermann and Xenia Boguslawskaja. Other clients included representatives of the old aristocracy, diplomats, politicians and bankers. Boxers (and nudes thereof) were a notable group in which she specialised, including Erich Brandl, Hermann Herse, Max Schmeling, Ensor Fiermonte.

Such was her renown that she became known simply as Die Reiss. While on a trip to Italy in 1929, she was invited to photograph Benito Mussolini.

In addition, she contributed to the journals and magazines of the day including Die Dame, Berliner Illustrierte Zeitung, Der Weltspiegel, Querschnit and Koralle.

== Move to Paris ==
In 1932, after falling in love with Pierre de Margerie, the French ambassador in Berlin(1922–31) she moved to Paris with him, and he died in 1942. She disappeared from the public eye during the Occupation. Even the date of her death cannot be clearly established and her place of burial remains unknown.

== Exhibitions ==
- In 2008, a retrospective of her work was held in the Berlinische Galerie. She showed at the important touring photographic exhibition Fotografie der Gegenwart in 1929. There was a solo exhibition of 177 portraits in Alfred Flechtheim’s gallery in Berlin in 1925.
