= Vera Skoronel =

Swiss-born German dancer and choreographer (1906–1932)

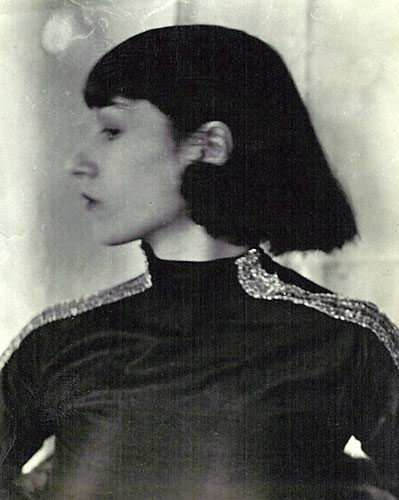
- (by anonymous) in costume, early 1920s
- Born: Vera Laemmel; 28 May 1906; Zürich, Switzerland
- Died: 24 March 1932 (aged 25); Berlin, Germany
- Occupations: Dancer, dance educator, choreographer
- Years active: 1924–1932
- Father: Rudolf Lämmel
- Relatives: Pavel Axelrod (grandfather); Isaac Kaminer (great-grandfather)

Vera Skoronel (28 May 1906 – 24 March 1932), born Vera Laemmel, was a Swiss-born German dancer and choreographer.

== Early life ==
Vera Laemmel was born in Zürich, the daughter of Vienna-born scientist Rudolf Lämmel (1879–1962) and Sofia (Sonja) Axelrod (1881–1917). Her maternal grandfather was Russian revolutionary Pavel Axelrod, and her great-grandfather was writer Isaac Kaminer.

Skoronel (a name she chose for herself) trained as a dancer in Zürich with Suzanne Perrottet and Katja Wulff, and in Dresden with Mary Wigman. At Wigman's school her fellow students included Gret Palucca, Hanya Holm, and Leni Riefenstahl.

== Career ==
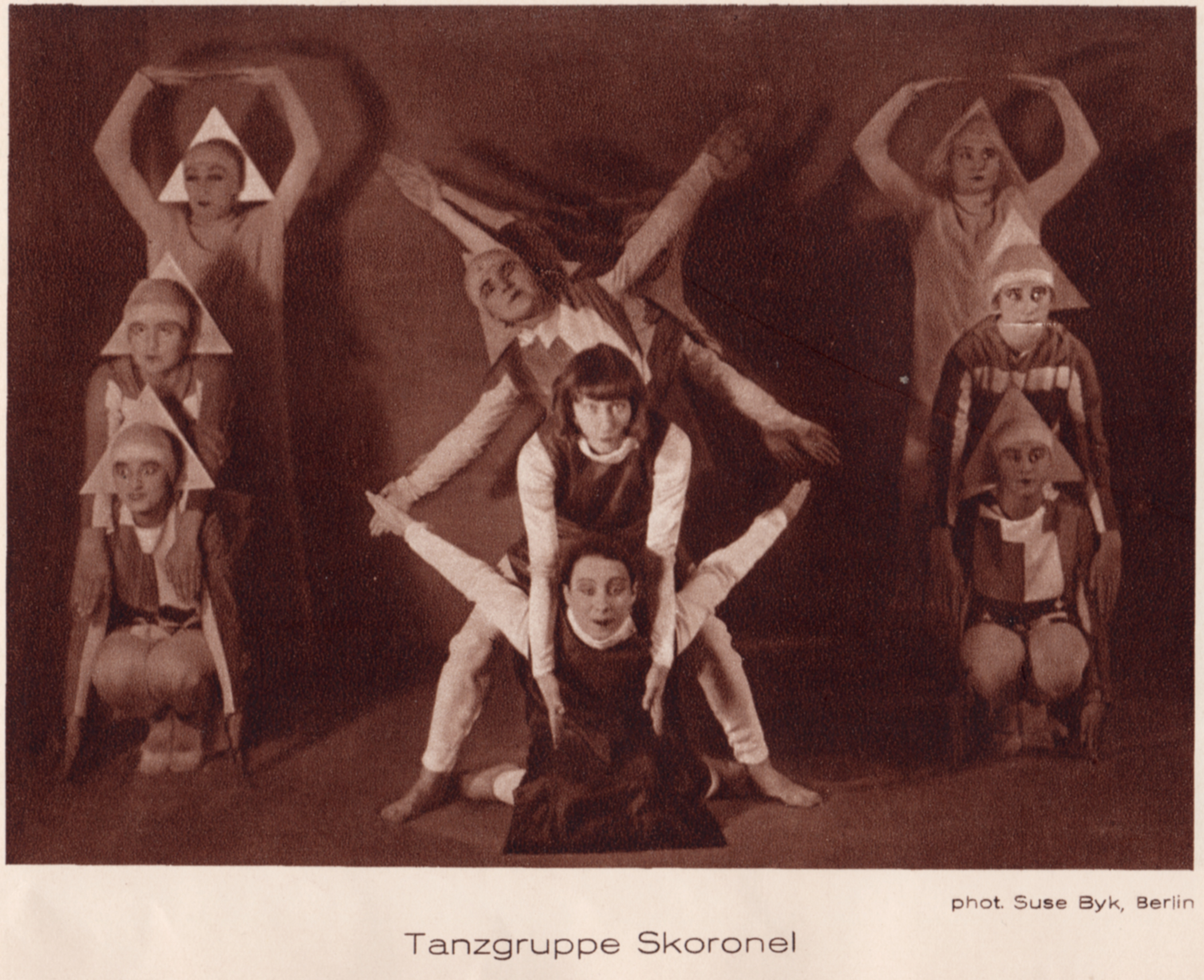
Skoronel dance troupe by Suse Byk, Berlin, 1920s

In 1924, Skoronel became dance director for theatres in Oberhausen, Hamborn and Gladbeck. In the 1925–1926 season she was dance director at the theatre in Darmstadt. In 1926 she opened a school in Berlin with fellow modern dancer Berthe Trümpy (1895–1983). She was a proponent of the modern style known as "abstract dance", or Ausdruckstanz. Her students included dancer Ludwig Lefebre, music educator Hanna Berger, diver Ilse Meudtner, and Polish artist Oda Schottmüller. She also taught members of the Sara Mildred Strauss Dancers, from New York. In 1930 she and her students attende the third German Dance Congress, in Munich. "Perhaps no dancer of the Weimar era was as aggressive in the pursuit of an emphatically modernist group aesthetic as Vera Skoronel," according to dance historian Karl Eric Toepfer. Illustrator G. R. Halkett described her as having "one face which could not be overlooked."

== Personal life ==
Skoronel died in 1932, aged 25, in Berlin, from a blood disease, possibly complicated by alcohol abuse. Her grave is in the Wilmersdorf quarter of Berlin, and there is a small collection of her papers archived at Deutsches Tanzarchiv Köln in Cologne.
