= Gerty Simon =

German photographer

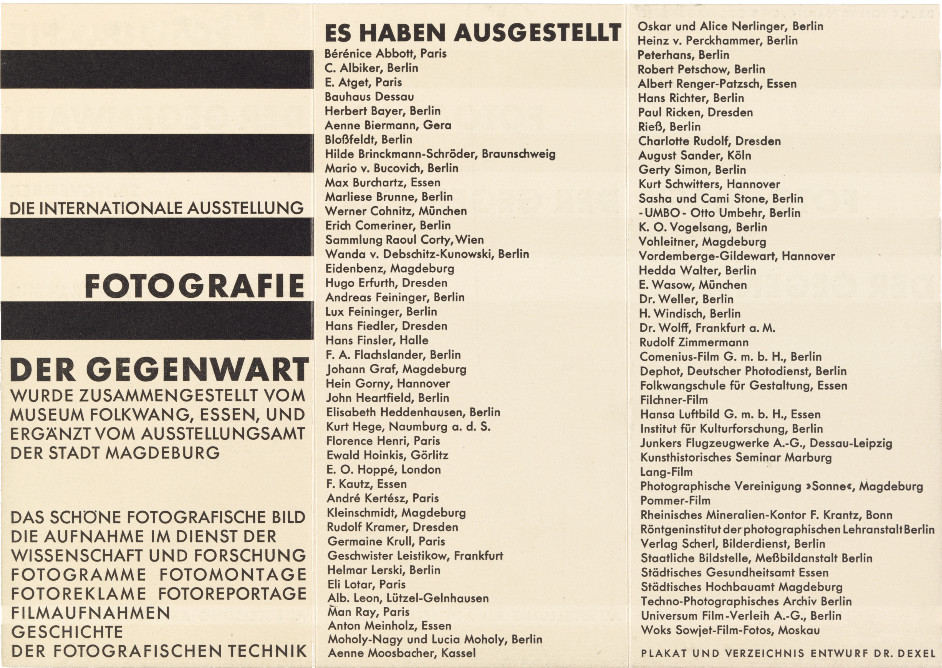
Brochure for Gegenwart Exhibition

Gertrud Simon (1887–1970), known professionally as Gerty Simon, was a German photographer who worked during the interwar period. Born Gertrud Cohn in Bremen to a well-to-do Jewish family with her father being a lawyer, she practiced in Berlin and later in London.

== Career ==
She was a German-Jewish photographer who captured many important political and artistic figures in Weimar Berlin, including Kurt Weill, Lotte Lenya, Käthe Kollwitz, Max Liebermann and Albert Einstein. Her Berlin studio was at Clausewitzstrasse 2.

== Personal life ==
Gerty Simon moved to Berlin after the First World War. Her husband, Wilhelm, like her father, was a lawyer. They had one son, Bernard (Bernd), born in 1921.

== Exile ==
With the arrival of the Nazi Party in power in 1933 life became very difficult for Simon and her family. In 1933, her son's school, the Landschulheim Herrlingen (later the Bunce Court School), a progressive boarding school transferred from Southern Germany to Otterden, Kent. Simon followed, while her husband remained in Berlin, unable to continue as a lawyer and judge, but finding work as a notary. The family was not reunited until 1939, and father and son were both imprisoned as enemy aliens. At 19, Bernard was even sent to an internment camp in Australia (until 1942) despite having lived in the UK for seven years.

Simon rapidly re-established her studio in Chelsea, and portrayed many significant individuals there, such as Sir Kenneth Clark, Dame Peggy Ashcroft and Aneurin Bevan.

She stopped working as a professional photographer from 1937 for unknown reasons.

Her husband died in 1966, and Simon died in 1970. Their son died in 2015 and donated his mother's collection of works to the Wiener Library for the Study of the Holocaust and Genocide in Bloomsbury, London.

== Exhibitions ==
Simon's work was shown at major photography salons of the day. She was represented at probably the most important German photography exhibition of the Bauhaus period, Fotografie der Gegenwart ("Contemporary Photography") in Magdeburg in 1929. Upon her arrival in London she exhibited in a show entitled "London Personalities", held at the Storran Gallery in Kensington in 1934.

Simon was the subject of a major retrospective, Berlin/London: The Lost Photographs of Gerty Simon, at the Wiener Holocaust Library in London from May–October 2019 followed by Gerty Simon. Berlin / London at the Liebermann Villa in Berlin in 2021.
