= Heinz von Perckhammer =

Tyrolean photographer

- Born: 3 March 1895; Merano
- Died: 3 February 1965 (aged 69)
- Known for: Photography
- Notable work: Peking (1928)

Heinz (Heinrich Josef Anton Alois) von Perckhammer (1895–1965) was a Tyrolean photographer best known for his Chinese nudes and Beijing street scenes.

== Life ==
Perckhammer was born in Merano, Austria-Hungary (now Italy) on 3 March 1895. In the First World War he served aboard the SMS Kaiserin Elisabeth during the Siege of Tsingtao and from 1917 to 1919 was a Japanese prisoner of war. He remained in China for several years after his release. In 1928 two volumes of his photographs were published in Berlin: one of carefully posed Chinese nudes, many taken in Macao brothels, under the title Edle nacktheit in China (The Culture of the Nude in China), and one of Beijing street photography, as Peking. In 1929 he accompanied the airship LZ 127 Graf Zeppelin on its round-the-world tour, as a photojournalist for the Berlin illustrated weekly Die Woche.

By 1932 Perckhammer had established a studio in Berlin, where his work included nudes and fashion photography. In the late 1930s some of his images were used as propaganda for the Strength Through Joy movement, and during the Second World War he served as a war photographer attached to the Waffen-SS. His studio in Berlin was bombed out in 1942, and after the war he returned to Merano. He died, aged 69, on 3 February 1965.
