= Lotte Jacobi =

German-American photographer

- Jacobi in 1977
- Born: Johanna Alexandra "Lotte" Jacobi; August 17, 1896; Toruń, Prussia (today Poland)
- Died: May 6, 1990 (aged 93); Deering, New Hampshire
- Citizenship: American
- Education: Royal Academy in Poznań, State Academy for Photo Design Munich, Ludwig-Maximilians-Universität München
- Occupation: Photographer
- Known for: Portrait photography
- Style: Humanist photography
- Spouse(s): Fritz Honig (m.1917, div. 1924), Erich Reiss (m. 1940, deceased in 1951)
- Children: John Honig

Lotte Jacobi (17 August 1896 – 6 May 1990) was a leading German-American portrait photographer and photojournalist, known for her high-contrast black-and-white portrait photography, characterized by intimate, sometimes dramatic, sometimes idiosyncratic and often definitive humanist depictions of both ordinary people in the United States and Europe and some of the most important artists, thinkers and activists of the 20th century. Ruth Jacobi was her sister.

== Work ==
Jacobi's photographic style stressed informality, and sought to delve deeper into the traits of her subjects than traditional portraiture. She made a point of photographing subjects in their own environments, and talking to them while she worked. She explained the reasoning behind her approach this way:

I just try and get people to talk, to relax, to be themselves. I don't like a passive, bored subject. I do portraits because I like people, and I want to bring out their personalities. Many photographers today, I think, are bringing out the worst part of people. I try and bring out the best.

“She taught me how to be good to people and create an environment where they could function and be comfortable,” New Hampshire Artist Laureate Gary Samson who helped Jacobi archive 47,000 negatives in the last decade of her life, and also created a documentary about her, explained. "One of her most important lessons was to always let the subject 'rule the frame,' which he still regards as the correct balance in the dialogue between artist and subject."

Jacobi is perhaps best known for her "portrait of Albert Einstein (Princeton, 1938), whom she photographed candidly, seated at his desk, dishevelled and dressed in a leather jacket, a work that was refused by Life magazine for its simplicity." Other personality-driven portraits include "Eleanor Roosevelt sitting back, gesturing, and obviously speaking in midsentence; Marc Chagall depicted as a jovial family man; Thomas Mann appearing as thoughtful as his work; and more candid, gentle portraits of Einstein." Other celebrated subjects included poets W. H. Auden, Robert Frost, and May Sarton; philosopher Martin Buber; writer J.D. Salinger; writer and activist W. E. B. Du Bois; scientist Max Planck; artist Käthe Kollwitz; the actress and singer Lotte Lenya; the singer and activist Paul Robeson; the actor Peter Lorre; dancer Pauline Koner; fellow photographers Alfred Stieglitz, Berenice Abbott and Edward Steichen; and political figures such as the first president of Israel Chaim Weizmann.

== Chronology ==
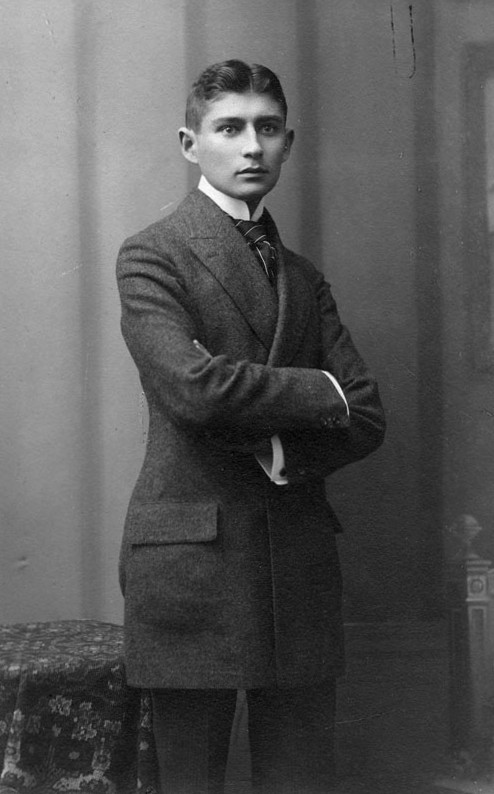
Atelier Jacobi: Sigismund Jacobi (1860–1935) c. 1906. Portrait of the author Franz Kafka by Lotte Jacobi's father.

Born in Thorn (Toruń), Prussia (now in Poland), Jacobi was raised in nearby Posen, the eldest of three children. At the age of 12, she took her first photograph with a pinhole camera, which set the stage for her to become a fourth-generation photographer, following in the footsteps of her father, grandfather and "great-grandfather who had studied with Daguerre", as well as joining her uncles, aunts and sister in the field. "I was to be a photographer," Jacobi once said, "and that was that.'”

After training at the Bavarian State Academy of Photography and the Ludwig-Maximilians-Universität München, Jacobi married in 1916 and, in 1917, gave birth to her only child. In 1921, Posen became part of Poland, and Jacobi relocated to Munich. She divorced her husband in 1924 and, in 1927, she entered the family photography business.

From 1927 until 1935, Jacobi managed her father's Berlin studio. During this period, she also began to work independently as a photographer. "Equipped with an Ermanox camera, she was passionate about dance and theatre photography. The exhibition Dance photographs organised by the Brooklyn Museum in 1937 presented a number of her moving images." But because portraits were the family specialty, they became her focus, as well, and soon "the local newspapers – Berlin had 120 of them – were clamoring for her work." Represented by the Schostal Photo Agency (Agentur Schostal), Jacobi also began producing films. There would be four in all, the most important of which was Portrait of the Artist, a study of artist and graphic designer Josef Scharl.

In 1932–33, Jacobi traveled to the Soviet Union, in particular to Tajikistan and Uzbekistan, taking photographs of what she saw. She returned to Berlin in February 1933, a month after Hitler came to power. As persecution against Jews rose, the left-wing and Jewish-born Jacobi found her work praised by German officials for its "good examples of Aryan photography". Soon after, Jacobi fled Germany with her son, losing nearly all of her early work when she immigrated. The pair arrived in New York City in September 1935 and, within three weeks, Jacobi had founded another family photography studio, alongside her sister Ruth Jacobi Roth.

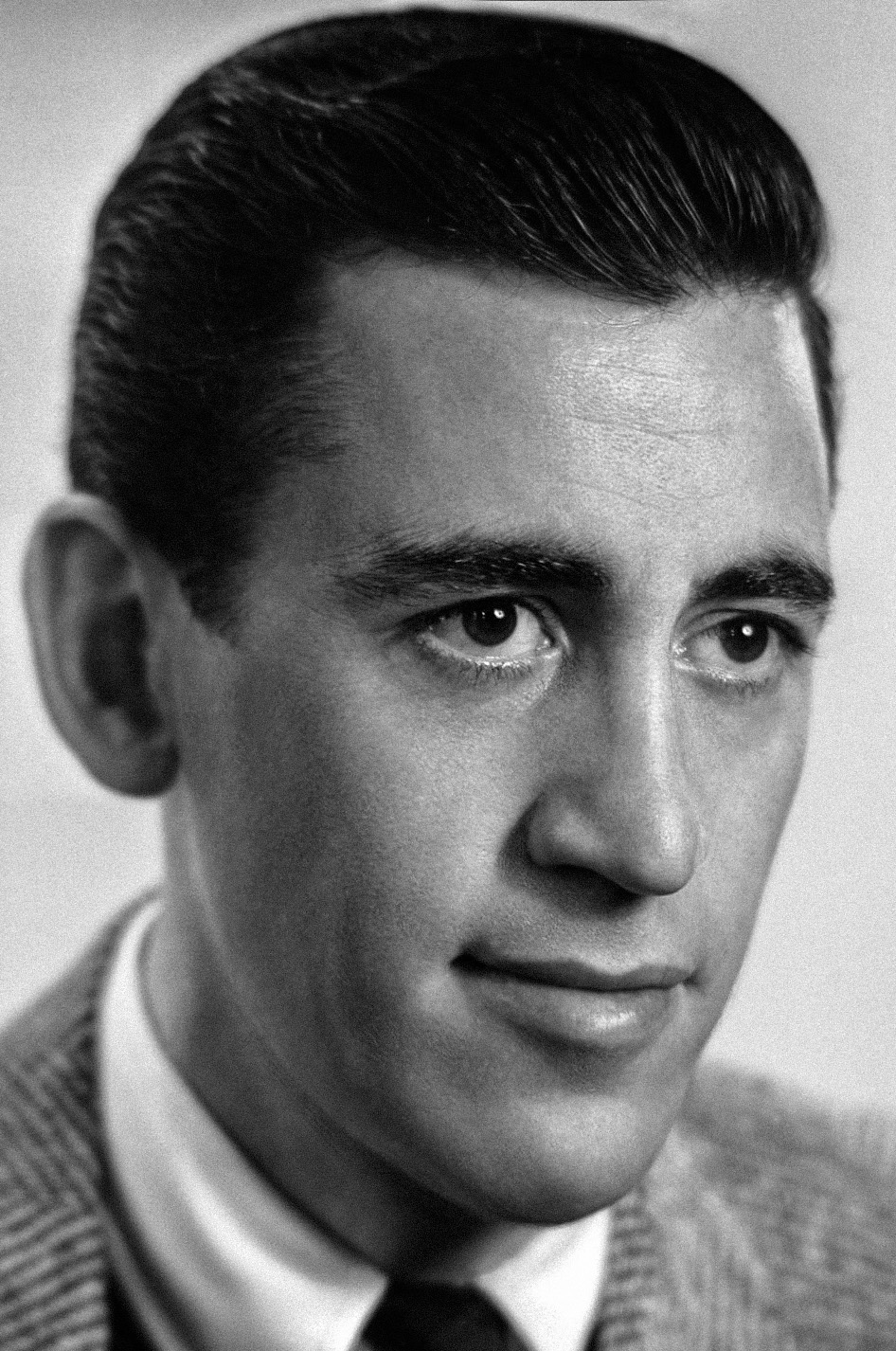
Lotte Jacobi. 1951. Photo of J. D. Salinger in one of Jacobi's more traditional portraits. The image was used for the first-edition back cover of The Catcher in the Rye.

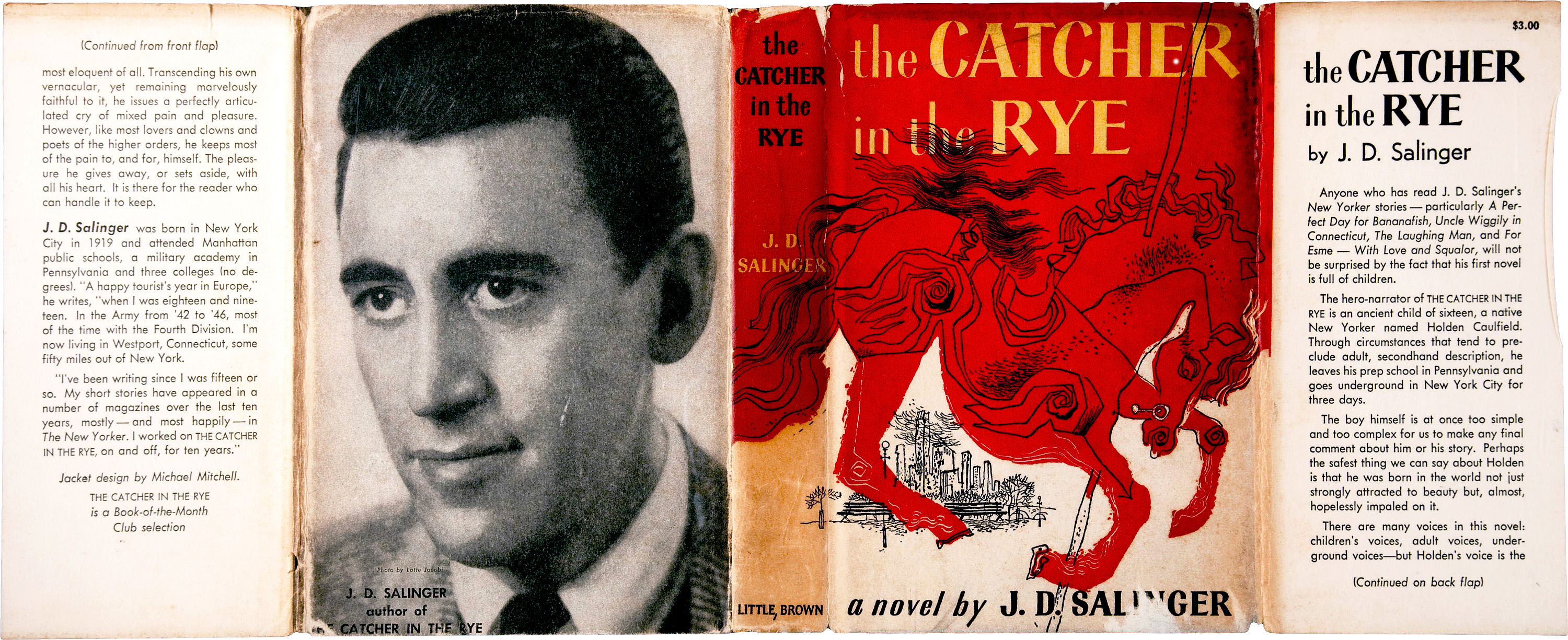
The photo in context

"In the 1940s, she approached experimental photography with her Photogenics series, images playing with textures and light, realised without a camera. A part of her series Adventures in the World of Light was exhibition at the Museum of Modern Art (MoMA) in 1948 in the exhibition In and Out of Focus. In her New York studio as well as in her New Hampshire gallery that she opened in Deering in 1963, she exhibited photographers that she loved, such as Minor White, as well as other female artists."

During the 1950s, Jacobi continued portrait photography as well as her pursuits in photogenic abstraction. In 1955, Jacobi left New York with her son and daughter-in-law, and moved to Deering, New Hampshire, a move that changed her life. There, she opened a new studio, where she both continued her own work and displayed work by other artists. She became interested in politics and was a fervent Democrat, representing New Hampshire at the Democratic National Convention in 1980. She traveled extensively and enjoyed new-found fame in the 1970s and 1980s.

Jacobi died May 6, 1990, at the age of 93. She bequeathed 47,000 negatives to the Lotte Jacobi Archives established at the University of New Hampshire.

Jacobi was the subject of a 2004 retrospective at the National Museum of Women in the Arts titled Focus on the Soul: The Photographs of Lotte Jacobi.

Jacobi's work was included in the 2021 exhibition Women in Abstraction at the Centre Pompidou.

== Education ==
Jacobi studied literature and art history at the Royal Academy in Poznań from 1912 to 1917, and completed her formal artistic training at the Bavarian State Academy of Photography and the Ludwig-Maximilians-Universität München from 1925 to 1927.

== Public collections ==
Her work is included in prestigious museum collections world-wide, including the MOMA, the J. Paul Getty Museum, the Jewish Museum, the Los Angeles County Museum of Art, the Philadelphia Museum of Art, the Princeton University Art Museum, the Israel Museum, Berlinische Galerie, and the National Gallery of Art.

== Personal life ==
The eldest of three children, born to parents Maria and Sigismund, Jacobi and her sister Ruth were fourth-generation photographers. ("A brother Alexander died at age 20.") Nicknamed "Lotte" by her father, Jacobi went on to adopt it as her professional name. In 1916, she married Fritz Honig, and a year later she gave birth to a son, John. The marriage did not last, and in 1924 they divorced. She then relocated to Berlin in 1925. In 1935, she fled Nazi Germany for New York City where she would remain for the next 20 years. In 1940, she married Erich Reiss, a distinguished German book publisher and writer, a marriage that lasted until his death in 1951. In 1955, she relocated to New Hampshire where she remained until her death in 1990.
