= Ruth Jacobi =

German photographer (1899–1995)

- Born: 15 May 1899; Province of Posen, Prussia
- Died: 21 September 1995 (aged 96); California, U.S.
- Occupation: photographer

Ruth Jacobi (15 May 1899 – 21 September 1995) was a German photographer.

== Life ==
Ruth Jacobi came from a family of photographers. Her great-grandfather, Samuel Jacobi, had apprenticed with Louis Daguerre and founded a photography studio. Ruth and Lotte Jacobi were the daughters of Samuel's grandson, Sigismund, and his wife, Mia Jacobi, née Lublinski. They grew up in Posen.

== Career ==
From 1920, Ruth Jacobi learned her craft at the Lette-Verein, a training institution for photographers in Berlin. she then worked for five years in her family's new photography studio at Joachimstaler Straße 5, later Kurfürstendamm. In 1928, she moved to New York, where she documented, among other things, Jewish life on the Lower East Side. After returning to Europe in the early 1930s, she divorced her first husband, Hans Richter, in 1933 and subsequently married the Hungarian physician Maurus Roth in Budapest. The Jacobi-Roth couple emigrated to the United States in 1935 and settled in Queens. Ruth Jacobi-Roth opened a photography studio in the US but eventually gave up her profession to assist her husband in his medical practice.

The archive of the Jewish Museum Berlin comprises 400 prints and a larger number of negatives from her estate. No exhibitions of Ruth Jacobi-Roth's photographs were held during her lifetime; however, some were published. One of her photographs graced the dust jacket of Michael Gold's book "Jews Without Money." Between 1937 and 1939, she was able to publish several images in the magazine Popular Photography. Some of her portraits of Albert Einstein were featured in a 1939 biography of the scientist and in the US magazine "U.S." used. A photograph by Ruth Jacobi-Roth was also published in Camera 1940, a photo book commemorating the centenary of photography. Jacobi's work was exhibited in Berlin in 2009.
