= Suse Byk =

German photographer (1884–1943)

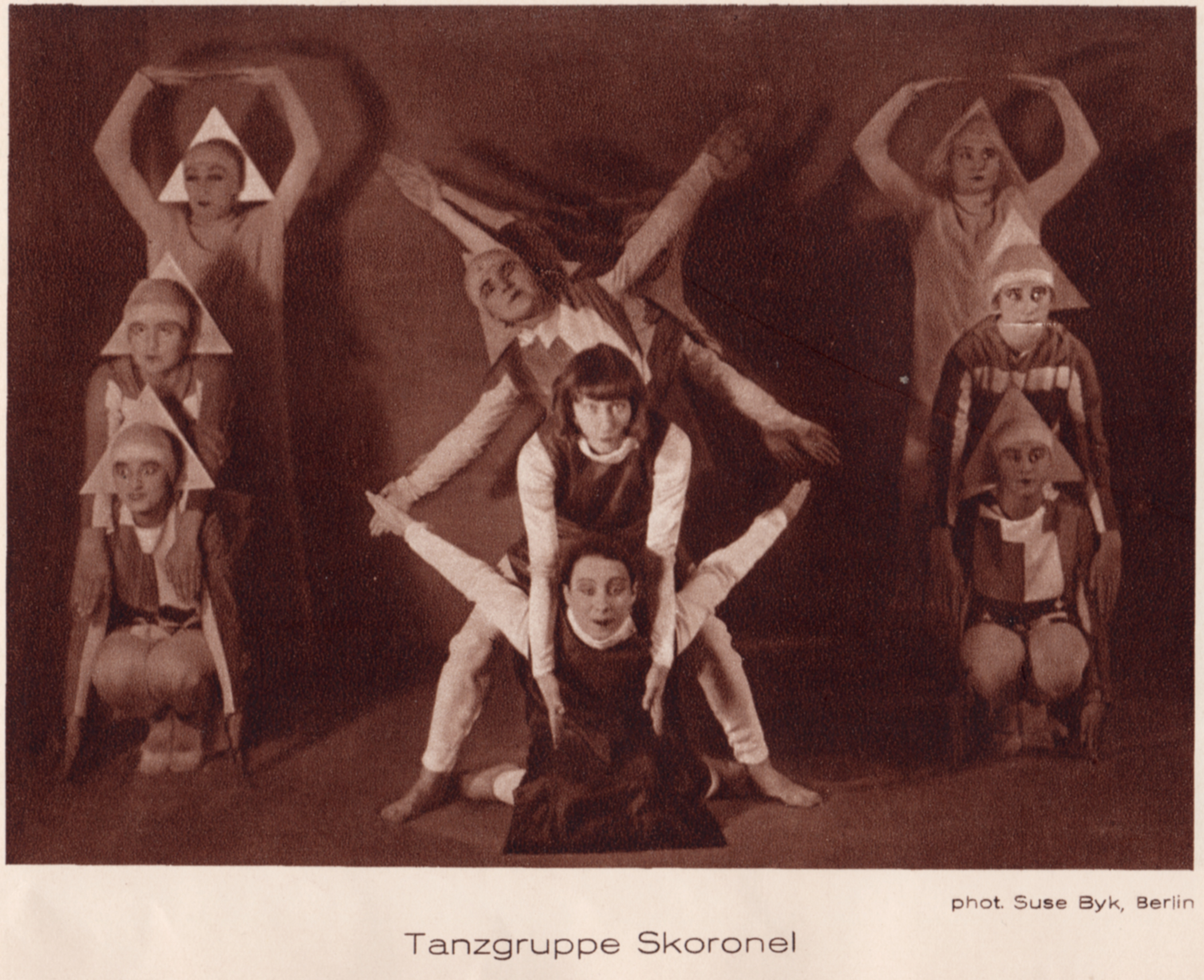
Skoronel dance troupe by Suse Byk, Berlin, 1920s

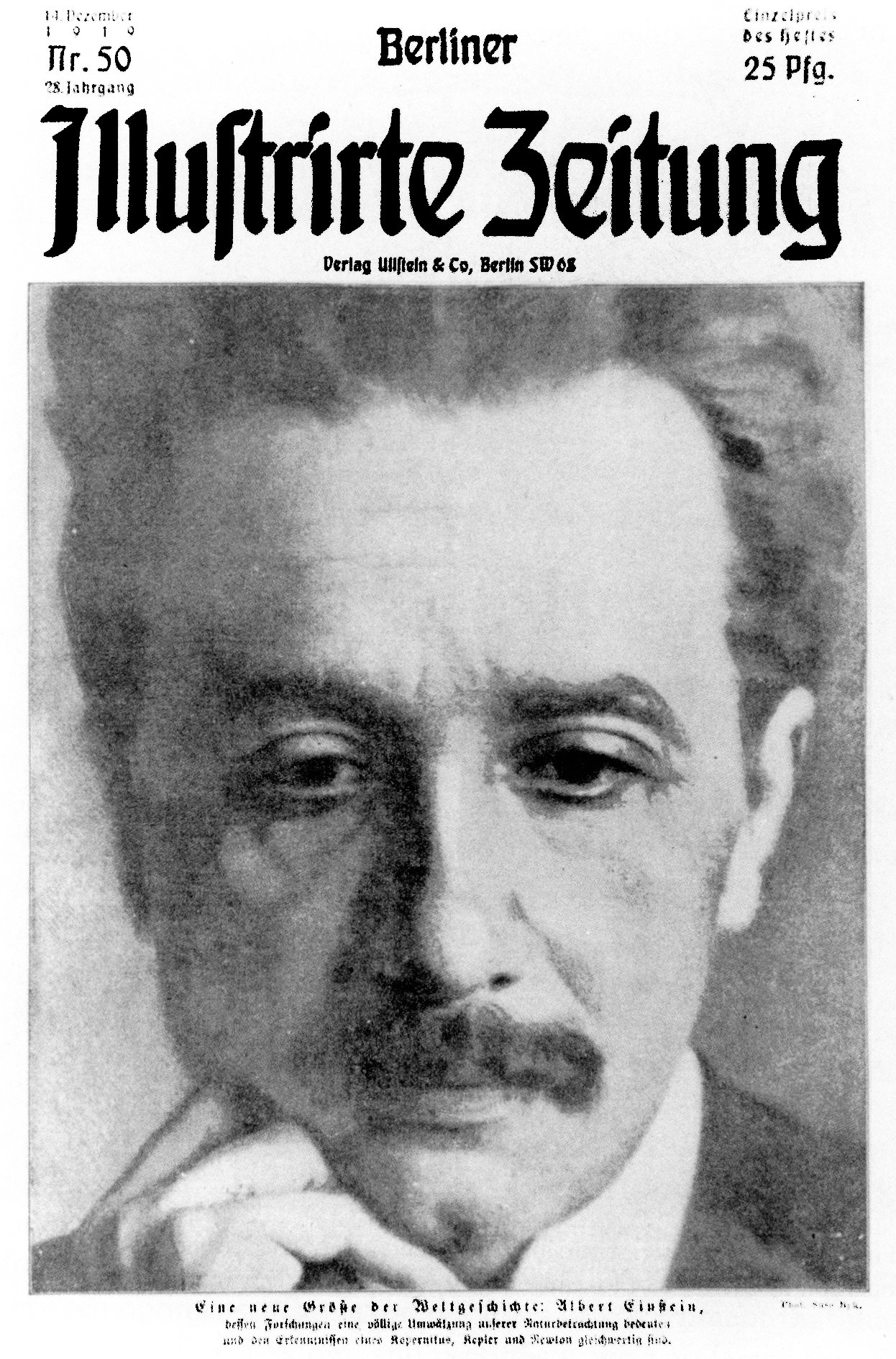
Albert Einstein by Suse Byk

Suse Byk was born 10 August 1884 in Berlin into a Jewish family of Ukrainian origin.

Suse Byk worked as a theatre and film photographer based in Berlin. Her work is in the Morgan Library & Museum and Museum of Photography, Berlin. She joined the Berlin Photographer Association in 1910. Byk's photographs of Valeska Gert appeared in Fred Hildenbrandt's 1928 book about the dancer.

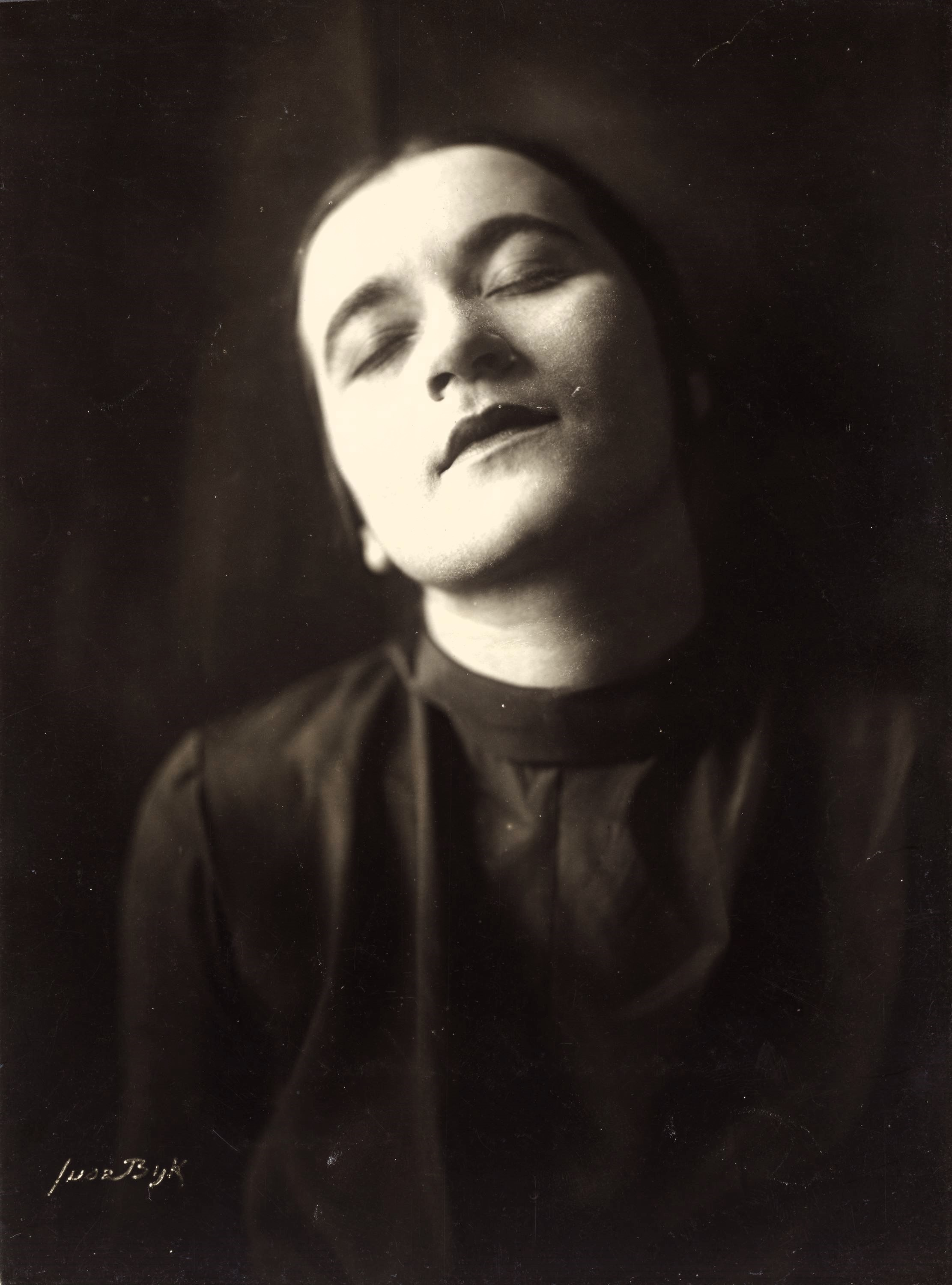
Valeska Gert photograph by Suse Byk

Byk married writer and journalist Hellmuth Falkenfeld in 1927. She died 10 September 1943 in Manhattan, New York City.
