= UHU (magazine) =

Defunct monthly magazine in Germany (1924–1934)

Uhu (meaning "eagle owl" in English) was a monthly magazine published from 1924 to 1934 in Berlin by Ullstein Verlag. Today it is considered a pioneering publication of the Weimar period.

== History and profile ==
The first issue of Uhu appeared in October 1924, the last in October 1934, for a total of 120 issues. Long before other publications, Uhu pioneered trends in culture and science that later became manifest, such as the importance of broadcasting and television. Literary talents such as Fritz Kahn, who became famous later for his visualizations of body functions, and the futurist Ludwig Kapeller found their most important publication platform in the magazine. Philosopher Walter Benjamin, and novelists Bertolt Brecht and Hermann Hesse wrote for the magazine. Guest authors included the physicist Albert Einstein and Danish film star Asta Nielsen. For a time the later publisher Peter Suhrkamp worked at the magazine, as did Kurt Tucholsky, usually using his pseudonym Theobald Tiger.

Uhu's articles were illustrated with great care, using drawings and photographs. Erich Salomon, one of the first photographers known by name to a larger audience, published in Uhu, as did László Moholy-Nagy. Noted caricaturists include Georg Kolbe and H. M. Bateman. In October 1929, at the peak of its popularity before the Great Depression, the magazine sold more than 200,000 copies.Uhu took an early stand against the National Socialists. This was mainly reflected in the form of cartoons such as "Hitler receives the Nobel Peace Prize 1932". The magazine's social focus was occasionally conservative. Leipzig gynecologist Hugo Sellheim used photographs in an article on women and sports to argue that women who competed distorted their facial expressions unfavorably, and that their participation in sports was detrimental to their fertility. He advised women to abstain from sports.

In 1979, a 355-page facsimile edition of original publications in Uhu was published by Ullstein publisher in Berlin. The entire run of the magazine has been digitized and is available at arthistoricum.net. Its illustrations and articles are a rich source of material on the avant-garde Neue Sachlichkeit movement in Weimar Germany.

A 1928 article by Anita Daniel was translated into English and republished in 1995 and 2007: "Sex Appeal: A New Catchword for an Old Thing." It discusses how this concept, originating from the United States, became internationally recognized.
