= Revue des Monats =

Defunct general interest magazine in Germany (1928–1931)

- Editor-in-chief: Hubert Miketta
- Categories: General interest magazine
- Frequency: Monthly
- Publisher: Die Revue des Monats GmbH
- Founder: Hubert Miketta
- Founded: 1926
- First issue: November 1926
- Final issue: 1933
- Country: Germany
- Based in: Berlin
- Language: German

Revue des Monats (German: Revue of the Month) was a German language monthly general interest magazine which existed between 1926 and 1933 during the Weimar period in Berlin, Germany.

== History and profile ==
Revue des Monats was first published in November 1926. The magazine was founded by Hubert Miketta and published by Die Revue des Monats GmbH on a monthly basis in Berlin. Miketta was also the editor-in-chief of the magazine which covered articles concerning different topics, including film industry and short stories. The other topics included in Revue des Monats were theatre, fashion, sport, technology, automotive industry and visual arts. Its target audience was both women and men. The magazine folded in 1933 shortly after the beginning of the fascist rule in Germany.
