= Lehmus =

Lehmus is a Finnish surname, meaning "linden" in Finnish.

== Geographical distribution ==
As of 2014, 78.1% of all known bearers of the surname Lehmus were residents of Finland (frequency 1:9,746), 6.4% of Estonia (1:28,732), 5.8% of Sweden (1:234,447), 3.7% of Germany (1:2,971,431), 2.2% of Switzerland (1:513,249), 1.8% of the United States (1:27,788,560) and 1.2% of France (1:7,389,729).

In Finland, the frequency of the surname was higher than national average (1:9,746) in the following regions:

1. Pirkanmaa (1:3,718)
2. Southwest Finland (1:5,937)
3. Tavastia Proper (1:6,190)
4. Uusimaa (1:7,768)
5. Satakunta (1:8,894)
6. Central Ostrobothnia (1:9,553)

== People ==
- C. L. Lehmus (1780–1863), German mathematician
  - Steiner–Lehmus theorem
- Emilie Lehmus (1841–1932), German physician, nephew of C. L. Lehmus
- Juho Lehmus (1858–1918), Finnish shoemaker and politician
- Väinö Lehmus (1886–1936), Finnish stage, film and radio actor
