= Damenakademien München und Berlin und Malerinnenschule Karlsruhe =

German painting and drawing schools for women

Damenakademies or Ladies Academies were art schools for women in Germany. Prior to the 20th century, careers in art were inaccessible to women, who were denied access to the mainstream academies. While Russia opened its art schools to women as early as 1871, those in Germany remained male-only until the beginning of the Weimar Republic. Apart from the private studios of individual artists, only three large academies, the Ladies Academies (Damenakademies), accepted female students. These institutions were founded through self-help groups in Munich and Berlin and the Artist Academy in Karlsruhe, and offered a limited range of courses.

== History ==
In Germany, art schools, or "academies" (mostly later renamed as "Academies of Fine Arts") filled an important gap in the artistic education system for men and were considered on par with universities. However, women were denied admission until well into the 20th century and lacked an institution equivalent to the academy. With the exception of the Karlsruhe Malerinnenschule for women painters, a private art school with state sponsorship, it was only with the enactment of educational equality in 1919 that women were admitted to these academies.

While there had previously been limited admission of women, their participation had been highly restricted. For instance, women were not allowed to attend nude drawing and anatomy courses. For many artistically ambitious women, the solution lay in expensive private schools. While men could receive academic instruction even with limited financial resources, women's education entailed considerable expense. Thus students were selected based on ability to pay, rather than talent, further undermining the perception of women's abilities. Still, there was no shortage of women interested in art, and the private art schools proved to be a lucrative business.

Participants in the numerous 19th-century women's associations inspired by the women's movement joined forces to improve women's access to university education in the field of visual arts. On their own initiative, the women artists' associations founded so-called "Ladies' Academies" or "Female Painters' Schools", which enabled women to study art in a manner similar to that at the Kunstakademie. The most notable of these women's academies were the "Ladies' Academy in Berlin" and the "Ladies' Academy in Munich".

In addition to the women artists' associations in Berlin and Munich, similar associations were founded in other German cities: Württembergischer Malerinnenverein in Stuttgart (1893), one established by Philippine Wolff-Arndt (1849–1933) in Leipzig (1897), one in Düsseldorf (1911), the GEDOK in Hamburg (1926) and one in Köln (1929).

== Damenakademie Berlin ==
The admission of women to the institutions of academic art education was an important step in women's emancipation. While female students could study at the Königlich Akademische Hochschule für ausübende Tonkunst (Royal Academic College for Practicing Music) since it was founded in 1869, women remained excluded from the Universität der Künste Berlin (College of Fine Arts) until the German Revolution of 1918-1919, i.e. until the end of the German Empire.

The Verein der Berliner Künstlerinnen und Kunstfreundinnen (Association of Berlin Artists and Friends) founded its own art school in 1868. This school later was expanded to include a "Drawing and Painting School" with an attached "Drawing Teachers' Seminar", where, among others, Käthe Kollwitz worked as a teacher and Paula Modersohn-Becker studied with Jeanna Bauck. The artists who founded the association in 1867 were primarily concerned with "the promotion and support of all women artists who belonged to the association. This also included the establishment of various teaching matters both for the artists’ own further training and at the same time for the competent training of art-loving schoolgirls." In 1879, a pension fund was also established for women artists.

The exclusion of women from the Art Academy in Berlin was highly controversial in the first decade of the 20th century. The Hochschule für die bildenden Künste (Academy of Fine Arts) under its director Anton von Werner came under considerable pressure; demands for the admission of women to study were raised loudly. In 1904, a group of "Ladies", among them Käthe Kollwitz, Sabine Lepsius and Julie Wolfthorn, addressed a petition to the academy director. These and other petitions, which found support in the Prussian House of Representatives and in the press, forced the academy to take a stand on the issue of women's studies. However, the position of both the lecturers and the male students remained immovable. It was not until the spring of 1919 that the first women began their studies.

== Damenakademie München ==
No women were admitted to study at the Akademie der Bildenden Künste München (Academy of Fine Arts in Munich) from 1852 to 1920. Around 1900, Munich was a centre of both the arts and the women's movement. In addition to the goal of helping women gain civic and social rights, one of the central aims of the feminist movement was to improve educational opportunities for girls and women. Among other things, they demanded access to universities, which was finally permitted in the Kingdom of Bavaria starting in 1903. However, until 1919, women with the desire to become artists fought in vain for access to the Royal Academy of Fine Arts. The Königliche Kunstgewerbeschule München (Munich Royal School of Applied Arts), founded in 1868, granted women training beginning in 1872, at least in its "female department", with studies to become drawing teachers. Otherwise, aspiring female artists could receive an artistic education only at expensive private schools or the newly founded training centres, such as the "Damenakademie".

In 1911, Zofia Stryjeńska tried to circumvent this ban by enrolling under her brother's name. Disguised as a man, she studied for a year before the deception was exposed and she was forced to leave the academy.

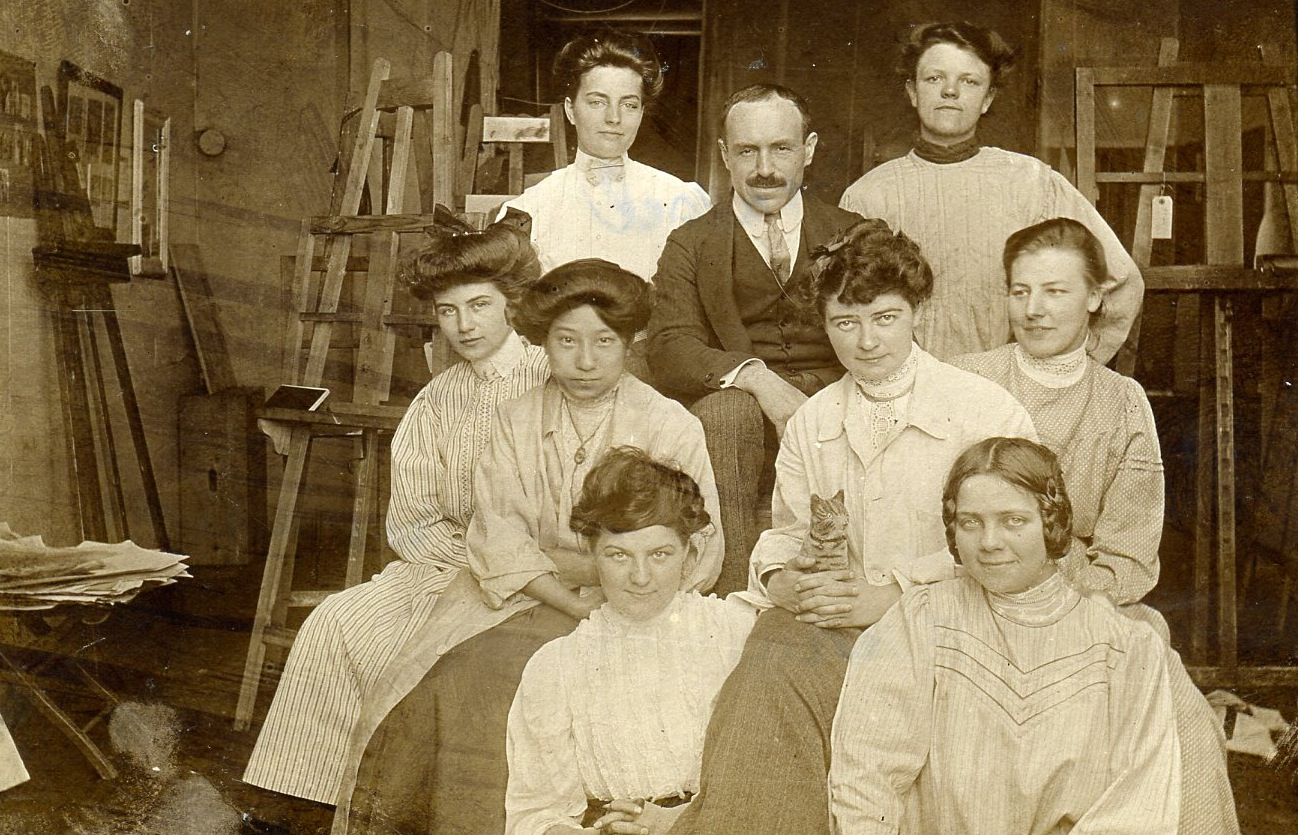
Adolf Höfer (1869–1927), the painter and his students of the "Damenakademie" Munich, around 1910

The Münchner Künstlerinnenverein was founded in 1882 by the collective action of women artists who had experienced the inadequacy of women's education, especially in the fine arts. Among the founding members were Jeanna Bauck (1840–1926) Bertha von Tarnóczy (1846–1936), Clementine von Braunmühl (1833–1918), Sophie Dahn-Fries (1835–1898), Ilka von Fabrice (1846–1907), Olga Weiß (1835–1898) and Martha Giese (1860–1923). Two years later, in 1884, they opened the Munich "Ladies Academy", which was organised on the model of the Royal Academy of Fine Arts. The house at Barer Straße 21 had five large studio windows on the garden side, and they offered training in figure and nude drawing, lessons in perspective, painting technique, art history, and anatomy, plus several electives such as portrait drawing, composition theory, still life and animal painting. In addition, the "Ladies' Academy" worked in summer with the landscape class in Seebruck on Lake Chiemsee. The students were taught by professors from the Munich Academy, among others, which earned the "Ladies' Academy" a good reputation. From 1894 onwards, the school was subsidized by the state, which led to an expansion of the school and the range of classes offered.

Munich's "Damenakademie" was soon widely known and attracted numerous young women from Germany and abroad who wanted to receive artistic training. In 1906, 427 students "from all over the world" attended the school. In addition to Gabriele Münter and Maria Marc, for example, Käthe Kollwitz also enrolled there. The students of the "School for Women Painters" were taught by Munich artists who also taught at the art academy or privately. For example, Angelo Jank, Ludwig von Herterich, Tina Blau, Maximilian Dasio, Max Feldbauer, Friedrich Fehr, Ludwig Herterich, Adolf Höfer, Angelo Jank, Georg Jauss, Lothar von Kunowski, Christian Landenberger, Franz Marc, Walter Püttner, Ludwig Schmid-Reutte, Albert Weisgerber and Marie Schnür, Johanna Tecklenborg, who was temporarily in charge of the association, and Heinrich Waderé.

In 1902, the Lehr- und Versuchsateliers für Angewandte und Freie Kunst (Teaching and Experimental Studios for Applied and Free Art), or Debschitz-Schule (Debschitz School) for short, was founded in Munich. From the beginning, women were allowed to attend this reform-oriented institution and the attendance was correspondingly high. In 1905, women were finally also able to attend the Staatliche Fachakademie für Fotodesign München (Teaching and Research Institute for Photography) and quickly achieved success with their work there.

With the opening of the Royal Academy to women in 1920, the "Damenakademie" was finally dissolved.

== Malerinnenschule Karlsruhe ==
Karlsruhe had become an arts center, especially after Frederick I, Grand Duke of Baden founded the Staatliche Akademie der Bildenden Künste Karlsruhe (State Academy of Fine Arts in Karlsruhe) in 1854. Coverage in the regional newspapers indicated that women interested in art could take lessons at private painting schools, prompting numerous women to come to Karlsruhe for art. The demand for professional training was enormous and teachers at the academy no longer accepted private female students. As a result, the Malerinnenschule Karlsruhe was founded in 1885 by uniting various private classes for ladies into a private art school set up especially for women. It was run as a private institution, subsidised by both the city and the state. On 1 October 1885, the School for Women Painters was opened under the patronage of Luise von Preußen. The school existed until 1923.

== Großherzoglich Sächsische Kunstschule Weimar ==
In 1902, the painter and director Hans Olde obtained admission for women to study at the Grand-Ducal Saxon Art School in Weimar. However, they were not granted an academic degree.

== Teaching and Research Institute for Photography ==
When it was founded on 15 October 1900, the Staatliche Fachakademie für Fotodesign München (Teaching and Research Institute for Photography), in Rennbahnstraße near Munich's Theresienwiese, initially admitted only male students. In a progressive policy, Georg Heinrich Emmerich admitted women to his courses starting in 1905. Wanda von Debschitz-Kunowski and Sophie Reynier were among the 1905/1906 matriculants and Elfriede Reichelt, Charlotte Poehlmann and Amalie Schroer matriculated the following year.

In 1909, due to female students' objections to the conditions of the uncomfortable dormitory, the school moved to a vacant former hospital building, which it opened in May 1911. Enrollment of both sexes was subject to quotas, so that only ten female students were allowed per semester, one for every three male students. During World War I, the ratio of female students increased to 3:2, reaching a more balanced ratio in the 1920s. 1In 1925, when Lotte Jacobi enrolled, half of the 51 enrolled students were women, and 80% were from non-German speaking countries.

A primary school certificate was required for admission (although this requirement was more flexible during the war; Germaine Krull's lack of a school certificate was overlooked), and men had to be at least 15 years old and women at least 17. School fees were about 200 Reichsmarks, which middle-class parents could afford, but even a well-off working-class family might struggle to cover.

== See also ==
- Women artists
