= Gertrud von Kunowski =

German painter

Gertrud von Kunowski, née Eberstein (24 April 1877 – 17 June 1960) was a German painter.

== Life ==
Born in Bydgoszcz, Eberstein first briefly attended the Staatliche Akademie für Kunst und Kunstgewerbe Breslau, then from 1895 she was taught by lecturers at the Damenakademien München und Berlin und Malerinnenschule Karlsruhe. One of the lecturers was Friedrich Fehr and her later husband Lothar von Kunowski (1866-1936). In 1901, she founded a painting school in Munich under her maiden name "Gertrud Eberstein"; after marrying Lothar von Kunowski in 1902, they continued the painting school together under the name "Kunowski". In 1904, they moved to Rome and in 1905 to Berlin, each maintaining a private painting school. When her husband was appointed professor and director of the Kunstgewerbeschule Düsseldorf in 1909, the couple moved there. Gertrud von Kunowski was "active as an artist" in Düsseldorf until 1936, was head of the preliminary seminar and seminar for portrait painting at the Kunstgewerbeschule and was involved in at least two of her husband's programmatic book publications. After her husband's death, she moved her residence and place of work to Schönau am Königssee, which she had already visited once before with him as an Sommerfrische and also more often together with students. Contemporary witnesses reported that Kunowski had not only staged her art, but also herself - dressed in clothes and hats she had designed herself, she had floated through neighbouring Berchtesgaden like a "colourful bird of paradise".

Kunowski died at age 80 in Schönau am Königssee and was buried within this community at Bergfriedhof.

The inheritance administration of her works is currently in the hands of her grand-nephew Reinhardt Rudershausen, who lives in Schondorf am Ammersee, who in turn appointed the painter and gallery owner Peter Karger in Berchtesgaden as the custodian of the entire estate in 1992.

== Activity ==
As early as 1901, she participated in an exhibition of the artists' association Munich Secession, which was followed by numerous solo exhibitions in well-known galleries such as those of Alfred Flechtheim in Düsseldorf and Fritz Gurlitt in Berlin. Since 1912, some of her works (including watercolours and drawings) have been part of the holdings of the Leipzig Museum of Applied Arts in Leipzig. The large-format painting The School of Painting from 1912, showing her studio in Düsseldorf, was acquired by the Bauhaus Archive after her death.

In the decades of her activity, many of her works received very positive reviews, and two years after her death, the Städtische Galerie im Lenbachhaus in Munich honoured her with a solo exhibition. In a 1988 article published in Die Zeit, she was praised alongside Käthe Kollwitz and Sabine Lepsius as one of those female artists who had attracted attention at the end of the 19th century and whose paintings "stood out more clearly from the series of often mediocre or simply marginal works".

After what was presumably her last own participation in an exhibition as part of the annual exhibition of the Berchtesgadener Künstlerbund in 1955 and the posthumous exhibition of 1962 in the Lenbachhaus, the executor of her estate Peter Karger initiated and organised, among other things, a first larger memorial exhibition of her works again in 2005 in Schloss Adelsheim. "She was able to see under the skin", was how others Walter Andreas Angerer praised the artist at the opening of the exhibition and was enthusiastic "about Kunowski's ability to imbue her pictures, even the sketches and drafts, with soul".

== Publications ==
- Licht und Helligkeit. With Lothar von Kunowski. 390 pages. 8 plates. Diederichs, Jena 1906. DNB-IDN 99835936X
- Unsere Kunstschule. With Lothar von Kunowski and 87 pictorial plates in collotype of original works by Gertrud von Kunowski. 218 pages. Dr. Albrecht von Kunowski, Verlag für Nationalstenographie, 1910.

== Posthumous exhibitions ==
- 1962 Solo exhibition. Lenbachhaus in Munich.
- 2005: Gertrud von Kunowski Gedächtnisausstellung. Solo exhibition. Adelsheim Castle from 4 August to 31 October 2005.
- 2012: Eva trifft Gertrud – a juxtaposition of her paintings with photographs by the Slovenian artist Eva Petric at the Galerie GANGHOF in Berchtesgaden from 21 July to 18 August 2012.
- 2013: Gertrud von Kunowski – eine vergessene Malerin des Jugendstils. Solo exhibition. Retrospective with works from the estate at Düsseldorf-Eller station from 21 April to 26 May 2013.
