= Sláva Tonderová-Zátková =

Czech painter (1884–1969)

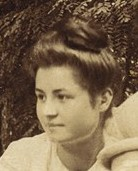
- Born: Miloslava Karolína Zátková; 1 February 1884; Březí, Bohemia, Austria-Hungary
- Died: 2 April 1969 (aged 85)
- Known for: Painting

Sláva Tonderová-Zátková (baptized Miloslava Karolína, 1 February 1884 – 2 April 1969) was a Czech landscape and portrait painter.

== Early life ==
Zátková was born on 1 February 1884 in Březí in Bohemia, Austria-Hungary (now a part of Kamenný Újezd, Czech Republic). Her father was a member of a wealthy family that founded a large food company, and her mother was the niece of the Czech writer and journalist, Karel Havlíček Borovský. She had four siblings, two brothers and two sisters. Her younger sister, Růžena, became a successful artist of the futurist school and a leading exponent of kinetic art. After moving to Prague, Zátková studied painting at the private school of the painter Antonín Slavíček. In 1909, she and her sister went to Munich, where they studied at the Ladies' Painting Academy, and in 1910, she attended courses at the Académie de la Grande Chaumière in Paris. After returning home, she married Ferdinand Tonder in 1912. He was a legal clerk with whom she had two sons, Ivo (1913–1995), later a British Royal Air Force pilot, and Hanno (1915–1955), later a lawyer and a prominent golfer.

== Artistic career ==
While her sister moved to Rome and pursued a career as a futurist painter, Zátková followed a more conventional path. In 1919 she held her first solo exhibition in the Prague Topič salon and in 1921 she exhibited her works again at the Topič. Six years later, an exhibition followed in the gallery of the Mánes Union of Fine Arts in Prague, of which she was a full member from 1918 to 1949. Her exhibits at this exhibition led to praise from the leading Czech art historian Antonín Matějček in the magazine Pestrý týden. She sought inspiration not only in the Czech countryside, but also from her travels around Europe. She visited southern France, Dalmatia, and the islands of Corsica and Mallorca, and also stayed in other Balearic Islands, as well as in Perugia and San Gimignano in Italy. In February 1937, she was among those from Czechoslovakia to exhibit in Les femmes artistes d'Europe, the first international all-woman art show in France, held at the Jeu de Paume in Paris.

== Later life ==
In 1944, Zátková was arrested by the Gestapo, together with her brothers Jaroslav Ferdinand and Oldřich, and imprisoned for 13 months in Pankrác Prison, Prague until the end of the war. The reason for her imprisonment was the secret departure of her son Ivo, who left Czechoslovakia in 1939 and joined the Royal Air Force. She exhibited again in Prague in 1946 but, as a member of the capitalist class in a country that was now under the control of the Soviet Union, found life difficult after that. Her last exhibition was held in 1959 at the Václav Špála Gallery in Prague.

Zátková died in Prague on 2 April 1969.
