= Philippine Wolff-Arndt =

German woman painter

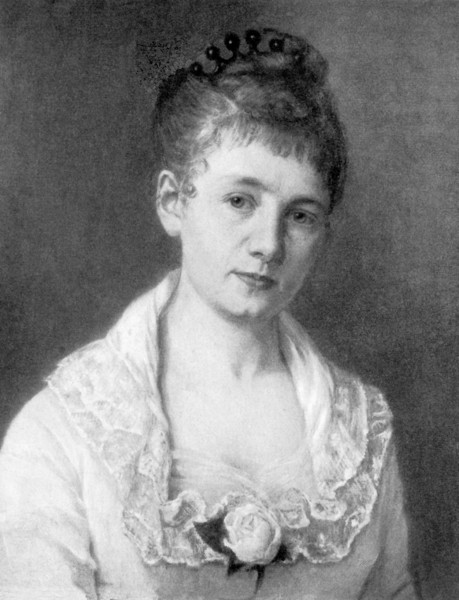
Philippine Wolff-Arndt, Selbstporträt, 1879

Philippine Wolff-Arndt (geb. Arndt; 1849–1940) was a German painter. Despite difficult access to an artistic education, she was active in this profession throughout her life. She was also committed to socially disadvantaged people and campaigned for women's rights, for example as a co-founder of the Leipzig Women Artists' Association. In Leipzig, she also fought for the Hochschule für Grafik und Buchkunst Leipzig (then the Königliche Akademie für Grafik und Buchkunst) to be the first art academy in Germany to admit women to study.

== Life ==
Arndt was born in Frankfurt in 1849. She grew up in a financially well-off family. As a pupil at the secondary school, she began taking drawing lessons with the painter Caroline Ziefraß at the age of 15. Thus, she had a female as her drawing teacher. This was an absolute exception at the time. In 1875, Arndt asked her parents to help her find an artist who could give her a recommendation for the "Städelsche Zeicheninstitut" in Frankfurt. The parents were not enthusiastic at first, but helped her in her search. Meanwhile, Arndt was a student at the Göbel Ladies' Institute for a year and took lessons from the painter Angilbert Göbel. Against all expectations, she was then accepted at the Städel Art Institute and continued her studies there. There, the sexes were spatially separated from each other. Women were not offered the same variety of courses as male students. The women painters nevertheless met secretly for the figure drawing.

In 1874, she spent a spring in the Frankfurt countryside and painted peasant women and people from simple living conditions there. In this way, she got to know their living situation and enhanced her social understanding. After private drawing lessons at the Städelsches Zeicheninstitut, she wanted to study at a recognised art academy and moved to Munich in 1875. At the Alte Pinakothek, she took lessons from Franz von Lenbach, who was also court painter and personal painter to Bismarck at the time.

A stay in Italy followed from 1877 to 1879. There, she visited the Vatican, monasteries and villas and joined the Roman drawing circle Circolo Chigi, with whom she made many drawing excursions. During this time, she produced numerous head studies. Nevertheless, she criticised the fact that women were not allowed to draw nudes here either and could only take part in the costume painting course. In Italy she received, as before from painter Anton Burger in Frankfurt, the unsolicited advice not to marry if she wanted to continue working as a painter.

She nevertheless married Anton Heinrich-Wolff in 1880 at the age of 32 and moved with him to Leipzig. There, she worked as a painter and painted numerous portraits of well-known personalities, such as Henriette Goldschmidt. She often had to contend with prejudice: works of art by her were praised in the highest terms, but as soon as it became apparent that they were by a female painter, derogatory comments followed. Her three children Constanze, Erich and Oscar were also born in Leipzig. Regarding the conflict between family and profession, she wrote:

"It was a conflict that also existed for me, remained, despite the fact that after my marriage not only was nothing put in the way of my artistic work, but it was encouraged in every way. And that was decisive."

Since she herself had experienced much discrimination in access to artistic training because of her gender, together with Charlotte Windscheid, she founded the "Künstlerinnenverein Leipzig" in 1896. At the end of the 19th century, numerous women in various cities joined together in associations to fight for better educational opportunities, including many women artists. So-called ladies' academies often emerged from these women's artists' associations, which enabled women to study art, for example the Damenakademie München. These were the first advances that did not yet exist in Wolff-Arndt's youth, when private painting lessons were the only possibility for an artistic education. But even the women's academies were often only open to daughters of well-off families because of the high costs. Women were not legally admitted to regular universities and academies until 1919 with the Weimar Constitution.

In 1901, Wolff-Arndt supported Max Seliger, the director of the Royal Academy for Graphic Arts and the Book Trade in Leipzig, in admitting women to study at the academy. In 1905, the Academy became the first art academy in Germany where women were also allowed to study. In 1913, more women than men studied there. The Leipzig Art Academy developed as a pioneer for women's art studies. Wolff-Arndt continued to be politically active, chairing the Leipzig chapter of the Deutscher Verband für Frauenstimmrecht and serving on the board of the Saxon regional association in the German Association for Women's Suffrage. During the First World War, she was the only woman on the board of the Economic Association of Visual Artists and organised aid for the needy.

After the end of the First World War, Wolff-Arndt moved to Munich in 1919 with her daughter Constanze, who by then had the name Constanze Hallgarten. Here Constanze Hallgarten took over the group of the Women's International League for Peace and Freedom and was one of the leading women in the German peace movement. Early on, she warned of the dangers of National Socialism and was on a "blacklist" of the National Socialists during the Hitler-Ludendorff-Putsch in 1923. Meanwhile, Wolff-Arndt continued to work as a painter in Munich. She painted still lifes and self portraits.

After the Machtergreifung by the Nazis, Constanze Hallgarten and Wolff-Arndt emigrated to Switzerland and from there to France. Philippine probably died in Paris in 1940 in a bombing raid at the age of 91. Her life was marked by political upheavals and wars: from the 1866 war between Prussia and Austria to the First World War and the beginning of National Socialist rule. She became increasingly politically active and successfully campaigned for socially disadvantaged people and better educational opportunities for women. At the same time, she managed to combine her family with her profession as a painter. She left behind an autobiography: Wir Frauen von einst: Erinnerungen einer Malerin, which was published in Munich in 1926. Here she wrote:

"I look back on my life: in terms of art, you can already call it a struggle".

== Work ==
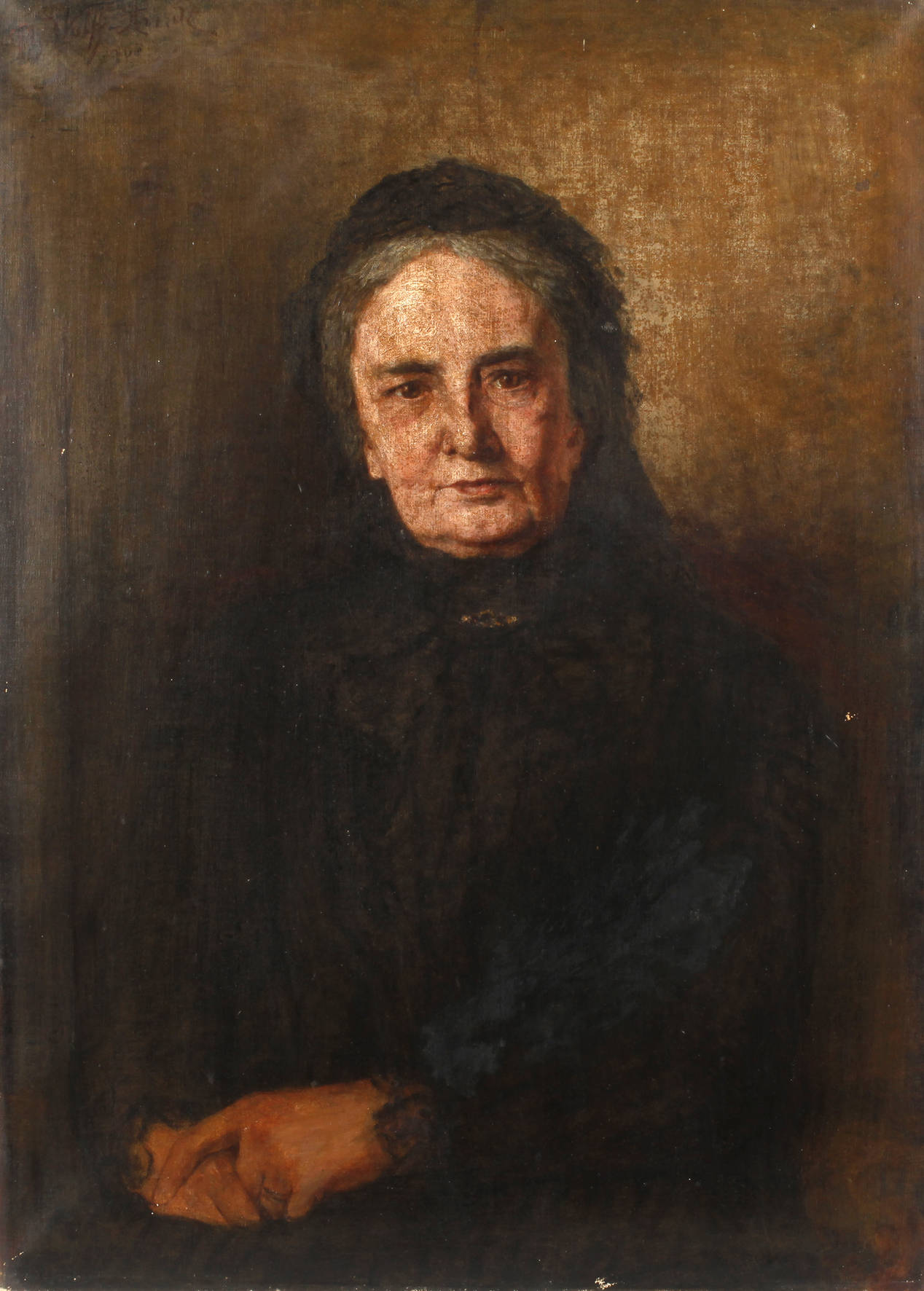
Philippine Wolff-Arndt, Portrait of a Lady: Half-length portrait of a lady in a black dress, oil on canvas, signed and indistinctly dated at upper left "Ph. Wolff-Arndt 1900".

Wolff-Arndt's interest in portraiture crystallised early on. In a review in a Frankfurt newspaper around 1870 one could read:

"Two female portraits painted by women are currently on display at the Städelsches Institut. Both artists, Fräulein Marie Schulze and Philippine Arndt, reveal a not insignificant talent and at the same time a certain courage that ventures beyond the traditional field of still life assigned to women to the much higher demands of portraiture."

This interest ran through her professional career: when she was an apprentice in 1875, she made studies of portrait paintings by the artists Ruben and van Dyck. In 1878, during her time in Italy, she created the life-size oil painting Wasserträger in der Campagna. In Leipzig, she produced a number of commissioned works by well-known personalities, including portraits of Otto von Corvin or Henriette Goldschmied. The latter hangs in the Henriette Goldschmied School in Leipzig. Later she produced some self-portraits and still lifes, which she sold. Some of her works are illustrated in her autobiography. Today, from her extensive oeuvre, only the portrait of Henriette Goldschmidt is known under her name.

== Publications ==
- Wir Frauen von einst. Erinnerungen einer Malerin. Munich 1926.
