= Franziska Tiburtius =

German doctor (1843–1927)

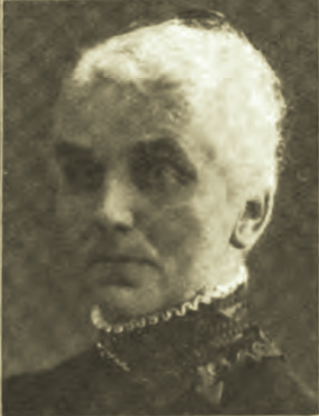
Franziska Tiburtius

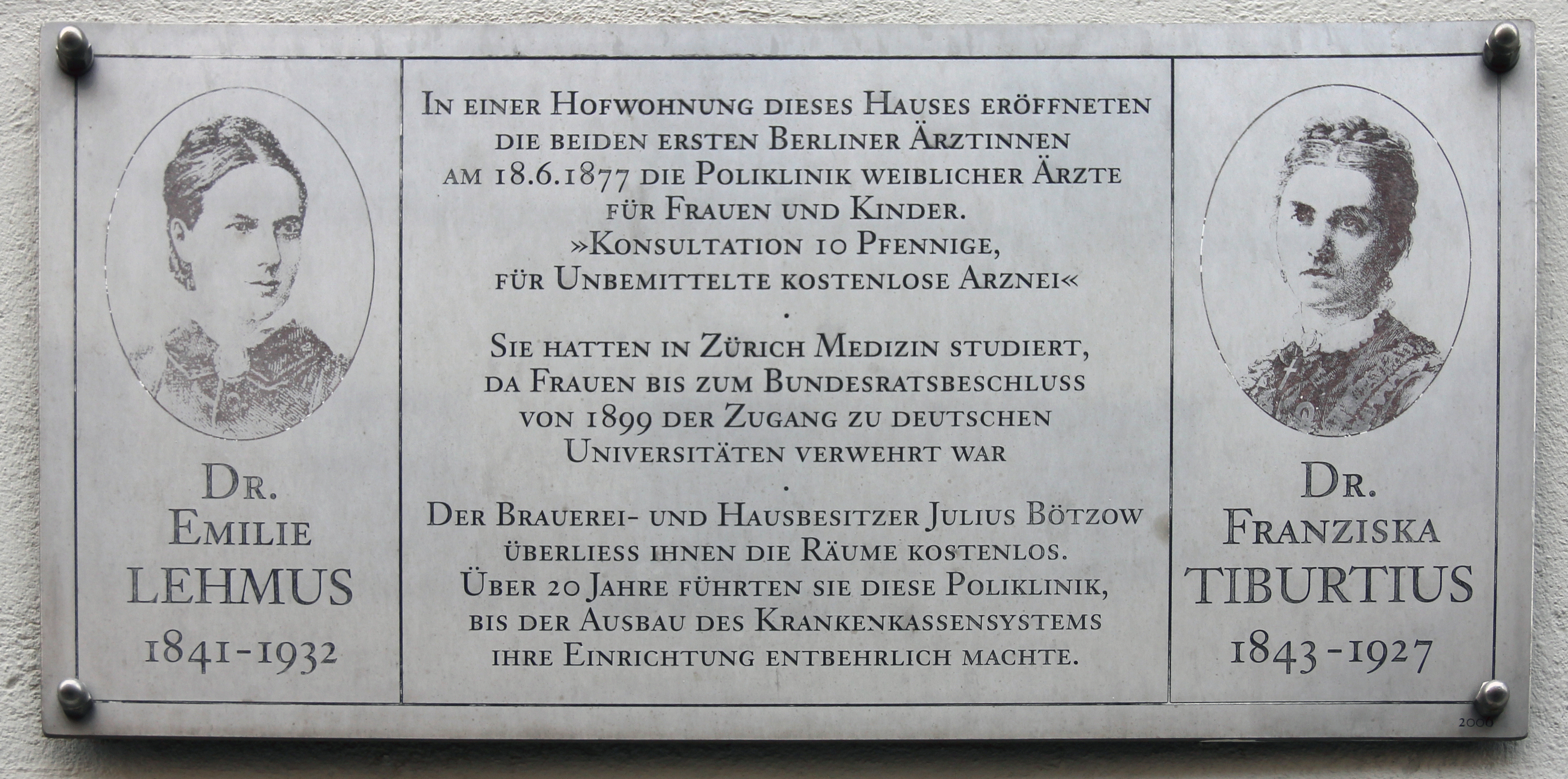
memorial plate for Emilie Lehmus and Franziska Tiburtius in Berlin

Franziska Tiburtius (24 January 1843 – 5 May 1927) was a German physician and advocate for women's education.

== Life and work ==
Tiburtius was one of the first two women to qualify as a doctor in imperial Germany. Born on Rügen Island in Pomerania, Tiburtius was the youngest of nine children and daughter to tenant farmers. Though she had intended to become a teacher, her brother Karl Tiburtius (an army physician) and sister-in-law, Henriette Hirschfeld-Tiburtius (the first woman dentist in Germany) encouraged Tiburtius to pursue medicine. Refused entry to German medical programs, Tiburtius studied medicine in Zurich, passing her examinations with distinction in 1876. That year she also completed an internship as a doctor of internal medicine with the gynaecologist and obstetrician, Franz von Winckel in Dresden. In 1877, Tiburtius established a women's clinic with her fellow student Emilie Lehmus (1841-1932) in Berlin-Mitte at Schönhauser Straße 23/24. Despite sustained opposition, including several court injunctions and slander, their clinic attracted a large clientele. In 1908, Tiburtius opened a Surgery Clinic for Women Doctors with her colleague Agnes Hacker, which deliberately accepted women patients lacking health insurance. The needy were provided medicine free of cost.

== Legacy ==
Tiburtius was a member of the women's movement in Germany. Throughout her career she advocated for women's education and the repeal of extant bans barring women from continued study. In collaboration with Helene Lange and Minna Cauer, Tiburtius helped establish a two-year continuing education program, or Realschule, in Berlin. Her Berlin-based clinic also dedicated energy to women's medical education.

Upon her retirement, Tiburtius traveled to America and North Africa and throughout Europe. She published an autobiography, Memories of an Octogenarian, about her childhood in Rügen. She died in 1927 in Berlin.
