= Kamenný Újezd (České Budějovice District) =

- Municipality
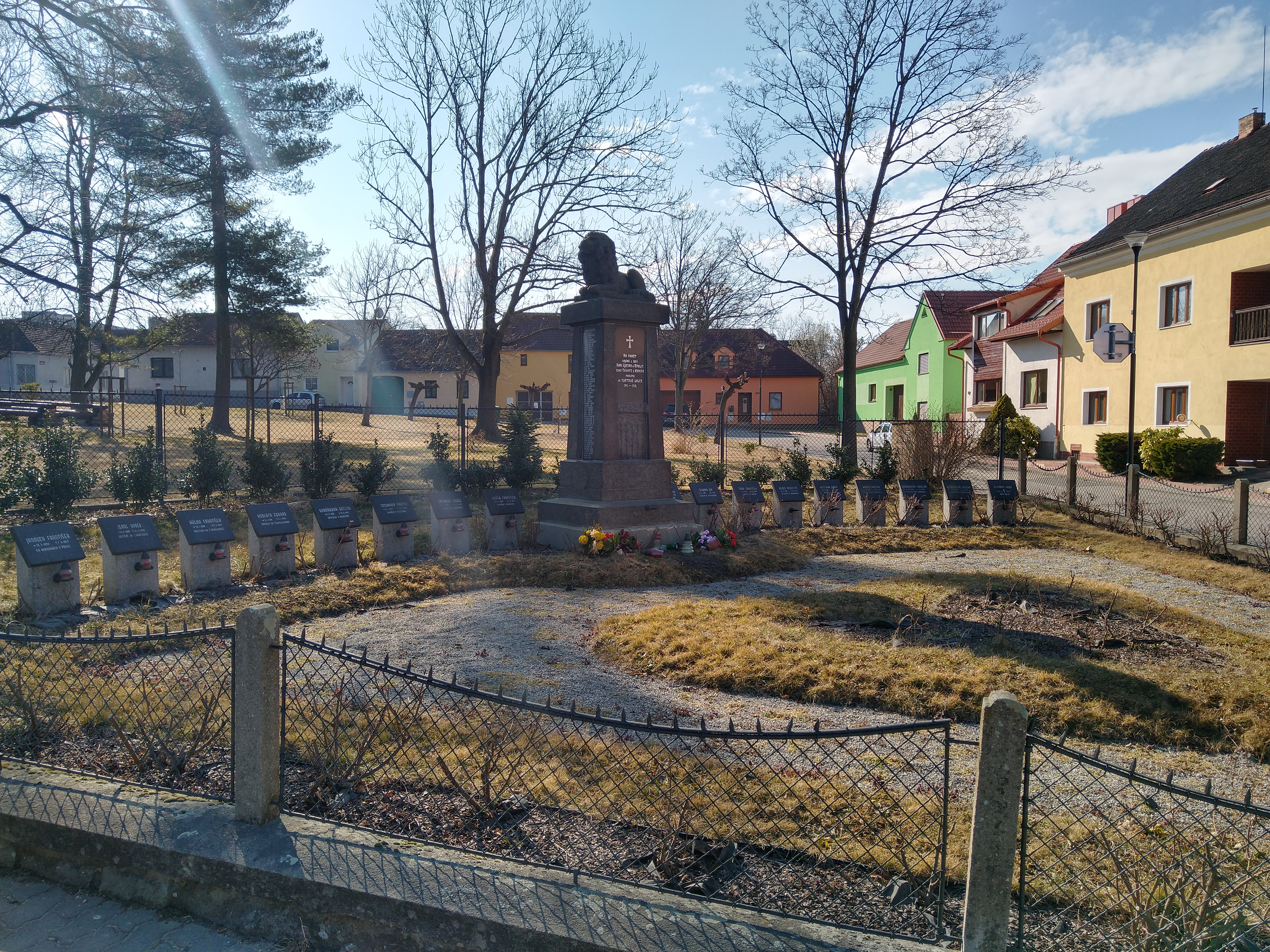
- Centre of Kamenný Újezd

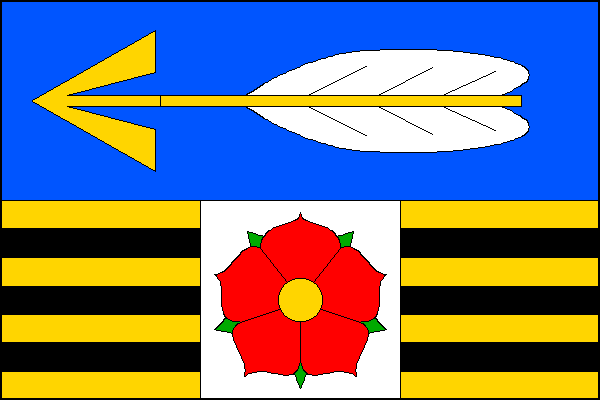
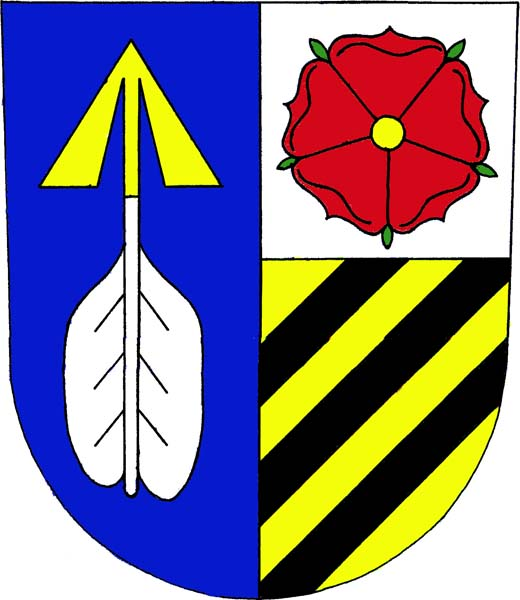
- Flag Coat of arms

- Location in the Czech Republic
- Coordinates: 48°53′51″N 14°26′47″E
- Country: Czech Republic
- Region: South Bohemian
- District: České Budějovice
- First mentioned: 1263

Area
  - Total: 28.97 km^{2} (11.19 sq mi)
- Elevation: 493 m (1,617 ft)

Population (2026-01-01)
  - Total: 2,697
  - Density: 93.10/km^{2} (241.1/sq mi)
- Time zone: UTC+1 (CET)
  - Summer (DST): UTC+2 (CEST)
- Postal code: 373 81
- Website: www.kamenny-ujezd.cz

Kamenný Újezd (German: Steinkirchen) is a municipality and village in České Budějovice District in the South Bohemian Region of the Czech Republic. It has about 2,700 inhabitants.

== Administrative division ==
Kamenný Újezd consists of nine municipal parts (in brackets population according to the 2021 census):

- Kamenný Újezd (1,887)
- Březí (40)
- Bukovec (83)
- Kosov (138)
- Krasejovka (124)
- Milíkovice (47)
- Opalice (45)
- Radostice (43)
- Rančice (55)

== Etymology ==
The name means 'stony Újezd' in Czech.

== Geography ==
Kamenný Újezd is located about 8 kilometres (5 mi) south of České Budějovice. It lies in the Gratzen Foothills. The highest point is the hill Na Vrchu at 574 m (1,883 ft) above sea level. The western municipal border is partly formed by the Vltava River. The municipal territory is rich in fishponds.

== History ==
The first written mention of Kamenný Újezd is from 1263. From 1455 to 1602, the village was property of the Rosenberg family as a part of the Český Krumlov estate. In 1552, the Rosenbergs unsuccessfully tried to promote Kamenný Újezd to a town. The estate was acquired by Emperor Rudolf II in 1602. Kamenný Újezd was badly damaged during the Thirty Years' War. As a part of the Český Krumlov estate, the village was owned by the Eggenberg family in 1622–1719 and by the Schwarzenberg family from 1719 until the establishment of an independent municipality in 1849.

== Demographics ==
Historical population

Year	Pop.	±%
1869	1,720	—
1880	1,902	+10.6%
1890	1,949	+2.5%
1900	2,019	+3.6%
1910	2,227	+10.3%

Year	Pop.	±%
1921	2,215	−0.5%
1930	2,171	−2.0%
1950	1,955	−9.9%
1961	1,970	+0.8%
1970	1,949	−1.1%

Year	Pop.	±%
1980	1,987	+1.9%
1991	1,819	−8.5%
2001	1,845	+1.4%
2011	2,160	+17.1%
2021	2,462	+14.0%

Source: Censuses

== Transport ==
The I/3 road (part of the European route E55) from České Budějovice to the Czech–Austrian border in Dolní Dvořiště runs through the municipality.

Kamenný Újezd is located on the railway line České Budějovice–Linz.

== Sights ==
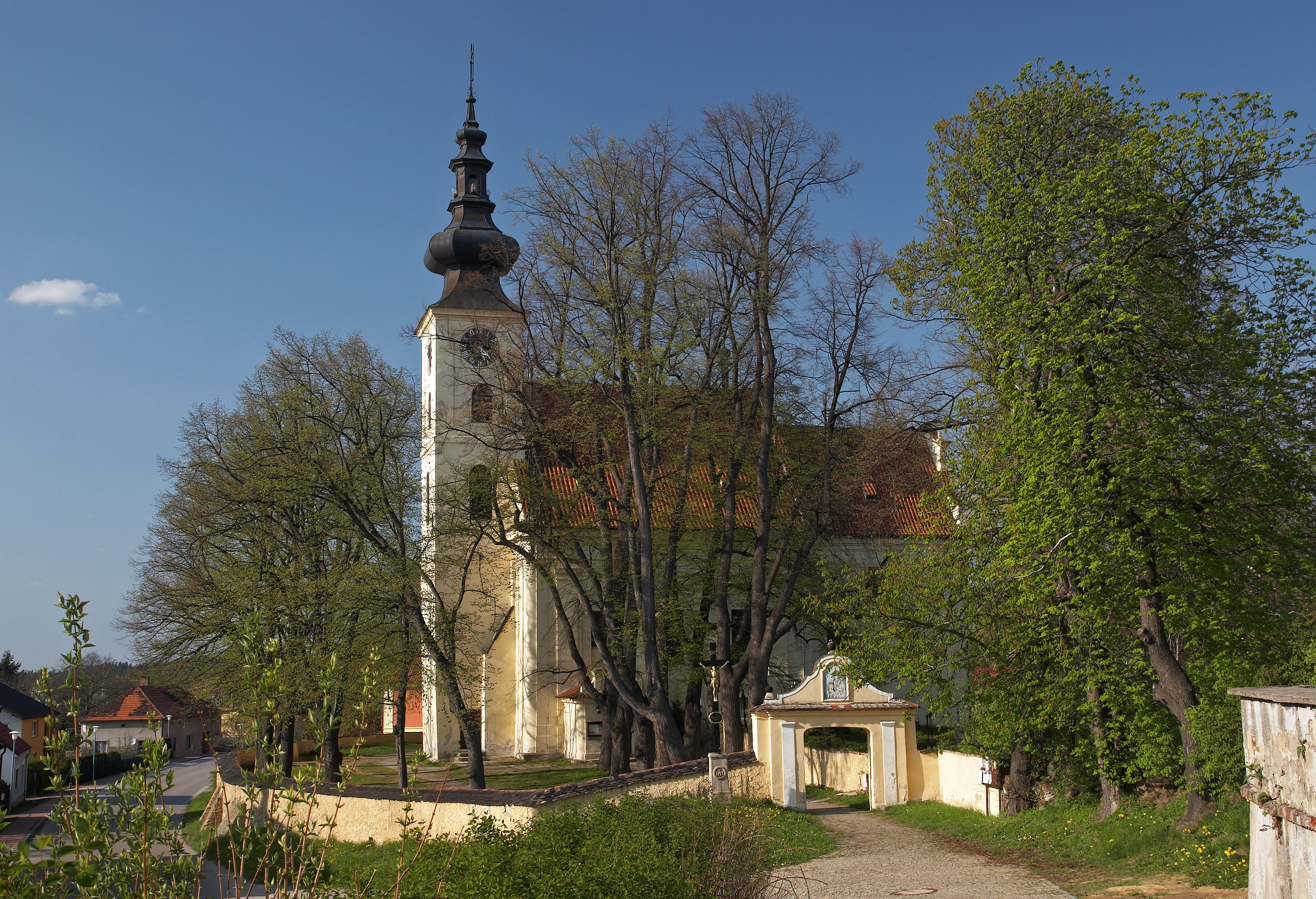
Church of All Saints

The main landmark of Kamenný Újezd is the Church of All Saints. It was originally a Gothic church as old as the village. Its present appearance is a result of the Baroque reconstruction.

== Notable people ==
- Sláva Tonderová-Zátková (1884–1969), painter

== Twin towns – sister cities ==
Kamenný Újezd is twinned with:

- Krauchthal, Switzerland
