= Josef Albert Amann =

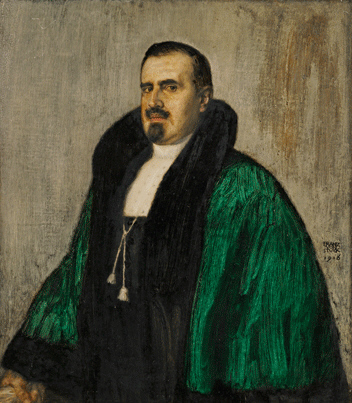
- Born: 1 July 1866; Munich, Kingdom of Bavaria
- Died: 17 October 1943 (aged 77); Munich, Germany
- Citizenship: German
- Education: Ludwig-Maximilians-Universität München

Josef Albert Amann (1 July 1866, in Munich – 17 October 1919, in Konstanz) was a German gynecologist. His father, Josef Albert Amann (1832–1906), was also a gynecologist.

He studied medicine at the Ludwig-Maximilians-Universität München, where his teachers included Karl Wilhelm von Kupffer, Otto Bollinger and Franz von Winckel. For several years he worked as an assistant at the university women's clinic in Munich, receiving his habilitation in 1892. In 1898, he succeeded his father as head of the second gynecological department at the Allgemeine Krankenhaus in Munich. In 1905, he became an associate professor at the university.

He held a particular interest in the anatomy and histology of female genitalia. In 1897, he published Kurzgefasstes Lehrbuch der mikroskopisch-gynäkologischen Diagnostik, an influential textbook of microscopic gynecological diagnostics. Also, he is credited with introducing a surgery for creation of an artificial vagina in cases of congenital absence ("Amann's operation").
