= Heinrich Höfer (painter) =

German painter (1825–1878)

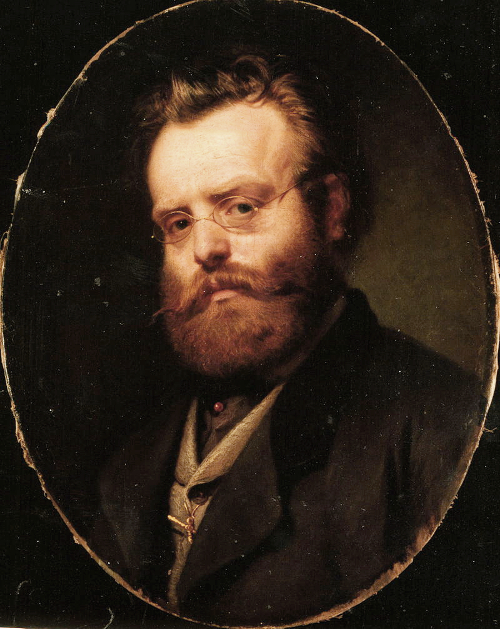
Self-portrait (c.1868)

Johann Heinrich Höfer (22 October 1825, Eisfeld - 10 February 1878, Munich) was a German landscape and portrait painter.

== Biography ==
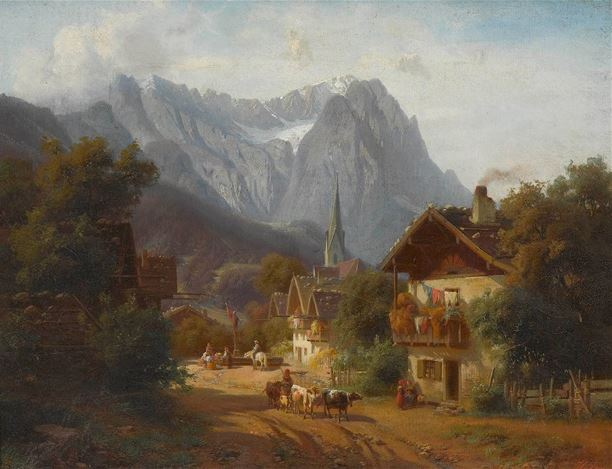
The Florianplatz in Partenkirchen

He was born to a respected family of weavers, who had become poor due to the mechanization of the textile industry. When he was fourteen, his father died and he was forced to earn his own living. He had some talent for drawing, so he was able to find a position as a porcelain painter. At the age of twenty-two, inspired to seek a career in art, he went to Prague to become a portrait painter. He had little success, and returned after two years.

He set off again in 1851, travelling through Dresden, Prague and Linz, to Styria, where he planned to become a landscape painter. This time, he was more successful. By 1855, he could afford to settle in Munich and join the Kunstverein (Artists' Association). There, he soon learned that being self-taught was not enough. Through some friends he was introduced to Eduard Schleich, who assisted him, and he was able to make copies of the old Dutch Masters at the Alte Pinakothek. He also decided to make a systematic study of nature, and made several painting expeditions every year, that took him throughout Bavaria, Tyrolia, and Switzerland. The Chiemsee and the Fraueninsel were among his favorite locations.

In 1867 he married Mathilde Nenninger, a doctor's daughter from his hometown. They had two sons; Wilhelm, who also became a doctor, and Adolf, who took after his father and became a landscape painter. He acquired a three-story house on the Gabelsbergerstraße, with six studio spaces in the back. Their home was a gathering spot for several Munich artists, as well as the architects Georg von Hauberrisser and Albert Schmidt.

Mathilde died of tuberculosis in 1873. The following year he married the widow, Amalie Ruhwandl, who was also a doctor's daughter. Höfer himself died of tuberculosis in 1878, shortly after taking a long-awaited trip to Italy. Amalie's two children from her first marriage had both died as infants, so she raised Wilhelm and Adolf. She would outlive Höfer by almost forty years, dying in 1917.

His works may be seen at the Munich Stadtmuseum, the Staatliche Graphische Sammlung, and the Braith-Mali-Museum, among others.

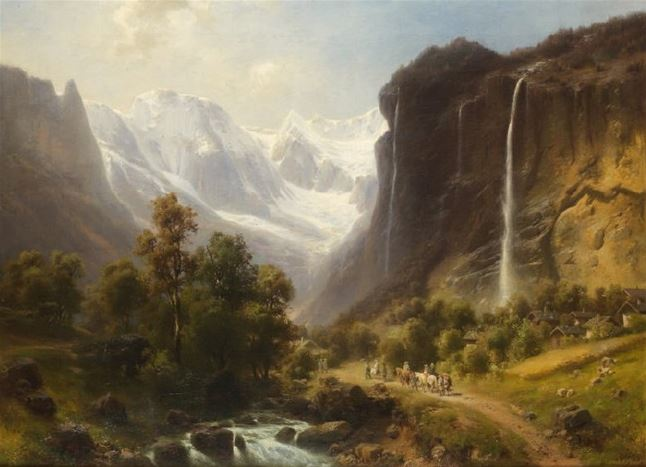
Staubbach Falls, near Lauterbrunnen
