= Adolf Höfer (painter) =

German painter and illustrator (1869–1927)

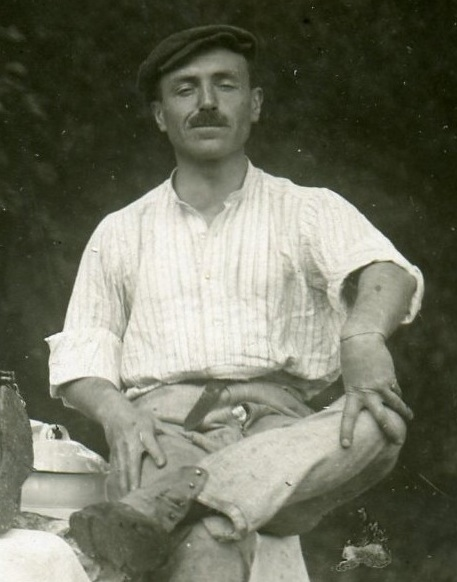
Adolf Höfer (1908)

Adolf Höfer (10 October 1869, in Munich – 14 March 1927, in Parsberg) was a German painter, illustrator, and graphic artist.

== Biography ==
His father was the landscape painter, Heinrich Höfer. Both of his parents died while he was a child; his mother Mathilde when he was four, and his father, of tuberculosis, when he was nine. In the interval, his father had remarried, and he was raised by his step-mother, Amalie.

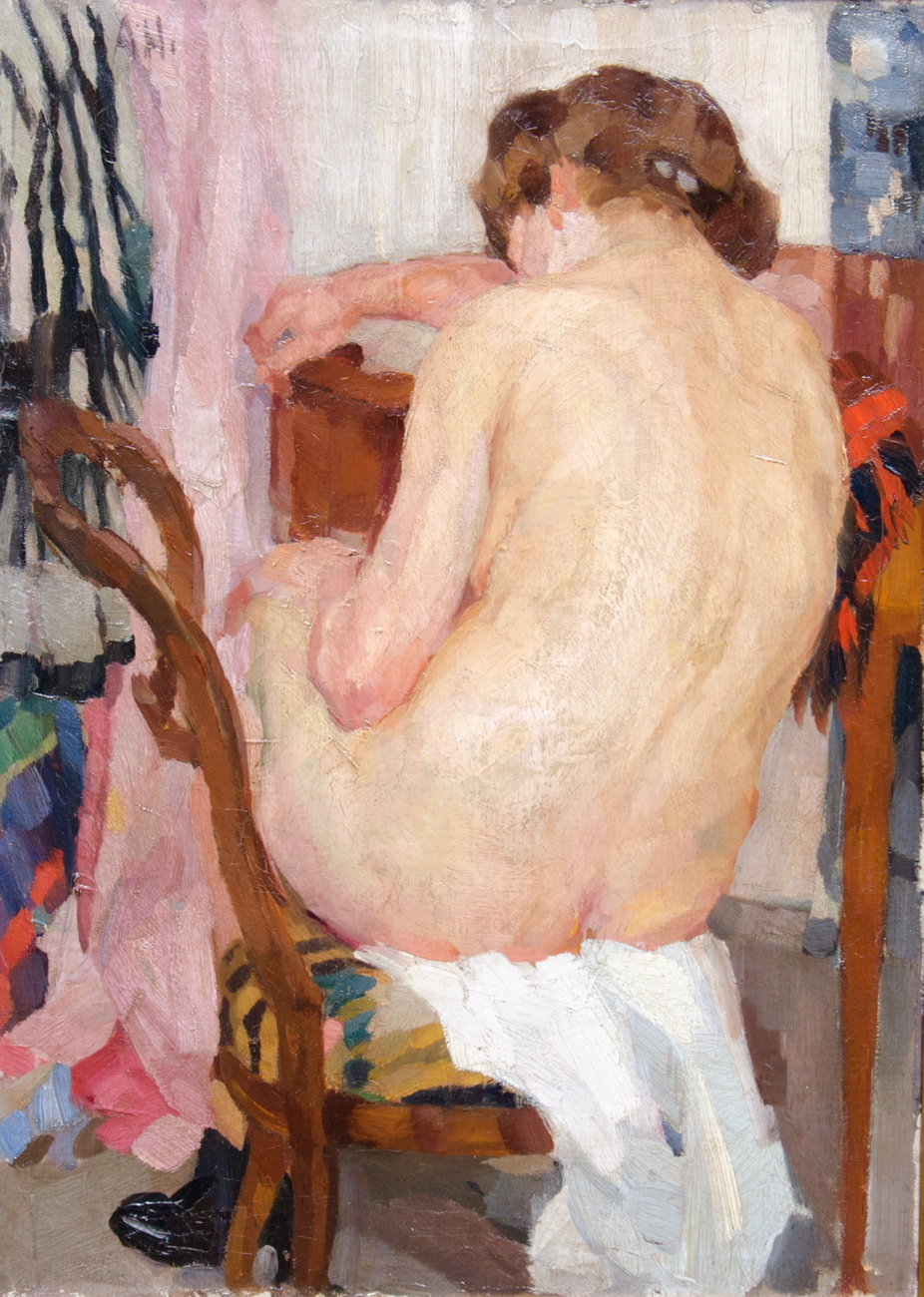
Female Nude, from the Back

After completing his primary education, he enrolled at the Academy of Fine Arts, Munich, where he studied with Ludwig Schmid-Reutte, then in the Nature Class taught by Ludwig von Herterich, and finally in the Master Class of Paul Hoecker. While there, he became part of the group of painters who created an artists' association called "Die Scholle"; an agricultural term that often means "homeland", but they denied any patriotic intent.

He initially worked as a graphic artist for the weekly art magazine, Jugend. Later, he created posters and other advertising materials, which were not very profitable. He participated in exhibits by Die Scholle, but received little attention from the art critics. In 1906, calling himself "reumütig" (repentant), he decided to focus entirely on painting. He did, however, teach at the Damenakademie, to provide a steady income. This also enabled him to afford a studio in Schwabing, Munich's Bohemian quarter. He had a relationship with one of his students, Nadine von Enckevort, which never led to marriage due to the differences in their social status and age.

His best works date from this period, he gained recognition and, in 1910, was invited to tea in 1910 by Luitpold, Prince Regent of Bavaria. When World War I began he volunteered, thinking it would be over quickly, and became an Etappenoffizier (someone in charge of logistics) in Flanders. When he returned home in 1918, everything had changed. Nadine had gotten married, his step-mother had died, and he found himself living alone in her apartment. The Damenakademie closed in 1920. He was able to exhibit twice, with the Munich Secession, but sold nothing. His savings were eaten up by inflation, so he was lonely and impoverished.

During those hard times his brother Wilhelm, a doctor in Parsberg, invited him to his home for longer and longer stays. There, he continued to paint landscapes and portraits. In the spring of 1927, he shot himself with his old officer's pistol. His grave at the Nordfriedhof in Munich was destroyed by a bombing raid in World War II.

His output consists of around sixty known paintings, most of them privately owned. Attribution is difficult because he was inconsistent about signing his works. A catalogue raisonné was compiled by Simone Brehmers in 2010. New works have since come to light.

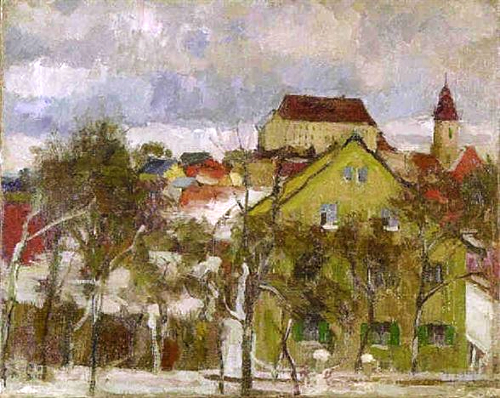
The Upper Plaza in Parsberg
