= Johann Adam Lehmus =

Johann Adam Lehmus (January 2, 1707 - February 13, 1788]) was a German poet of numerous spiritual songs.

Lehmus' songs first appeared in three collections: "David's Psalter" ( "Davids Psalter"), "Jesus in more than 100 songs" ("Jesus in mehr als 100 Liedern") and "Jesus in 365 Odes" ("Jesus in 365 Oden"), which were published in Rothenburg in 1762, 1766 and 1771.

== Biography ==
Johann Adam Lehmus was born on January 2, 1707, in Rothenburg ob der Tauber. His ancestors moved from Breslau to Rothenburg in the beginning of the 17th century. Lehmus studied theology in Jena under Johann Franz Buddeus. He died in his home town of Rothenburg.

His descendants include the mathematician Ludolph Lehmus (grandson), the pastor Friedrich Lehmus (great-grandson) and his daughter the physician Emilie Lehmus.

== Songs ==
- One is the good shepherd (Einer ist der gute Hirte)
- I am approaching my most joyful day (Es naht mein freudenvollster Tag)
- Great morning, the earth (Groesster Morgen, der die Erde)
- Where the Lord does not build the house (Wo der Herr das Haus nicht bauet)
- Where the Lord does not build the house Where man's not (Wo der Herr das Haus nicht bauet)
- Where God does not build a house by himself (Wo Gott ein Haus nicht selber baut)
- Where God builds a house not itself the house (Wo Gott ein Haus nicht selber baut das Haus)
- Zion's Lord and God is king (Zions Herr und Gott ist Koenig)
- Do not rely on proud sinner (Zuerne nicht auf stolze Suender)
