= Charlotte von Siebold =

German physician (1788–1859)

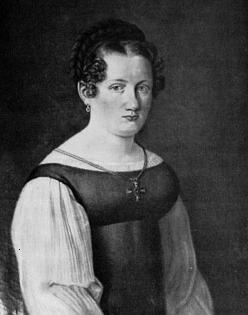
Charlotte von Siebold

Marian Theodore Charlotte Heidenreich von Siebold (12 September 1788, Heiligenstadt – 8 July 1859, Darmstadt) was a German medical doctor. She is regarded as the first gynecologist in Germany. She was the daughter of medical doctor Damian and Regina von Siebold and was an early assistant of her parents. She graduated with a degree in obstetrics at the Giessen University in 1817.

She assisted at both Queen Victoria's birth on 24 May 1819 at Kensington Palace in London and Queen Victoria's first cousin and husband Prince Albert of Saxe-Coburg and Gotha's birth on 26 August 1819 at Rosenau Palace near Coburg.

== Life ==
=== Origin and education ===
Charlotte was the first child of Georg Heiland and his wife Regina. After Georg Heiland’s death, Regina Josepha Heiland married (Johann Theodor) Damian von Siebold (1769-1828), the city doctor and medical officer of Darmstadt. Known as the “Starstich” surgeon, he was a son of Carl Caspar von Siebold and as such also uncle to physician and pioneering Japan scholar Philip Franz von Siebold.

Damian of Siebold adopted Charlotte and her sister Therese, with both receiving his surname. To improve the family income, Josepha von Siebold worked in her husband’s practice. Later, she even studied medicine and received the Ehrendoktorwürde der Entbindungskunst, an honorary doctorate of childbirth, in 1815 from the University of Giessen.

Charlotte was interested in medicine and read her father’s books on Anatomy and physiology. She later received theoretical instruction from her father and practical training from her mother, but the focus was on obstetrics. In 1811 Charlotte went to Göttingen to attend private lectures by Osiander and Langenbeck.

In 1814, Charlotte passed the exam for obstetrics before the "Grand Duchy of Hesse Grand-Ducal Medicinal-Collegium" in Darmstadt and was allowed to practise as an obstetrician from then on. On 26 March 1817, she became a Doktorin der Geburtshilfe, a "doctor of obstetrics" with the thesis work titled "Using pregnancy outside the cervical and abdominal pregnancies in particular".

=== Work ===
Charlotte von Siebold moved back to Darmstadt and worked there in her parents’ maternity hospital. She taught midwives and took care of the poor as well as raised money for the ‘Buergerhospital’ of Darmstadt. In 1829, she married the military doctor August Heidenreich (1801-1880) who was 14 years her junior. He later became Generalstabsarzt, the chief medical doctor of the armed forces. In 1845, she set up an obstetric facility for the poor in Darmstadt.

She enjoyed an excellent reputation as a midwife and was called several times to assist with births in multiple royal courts. She helped both Princess Victoria of Saxe-Coburg-Saalfeld, Duchess of Kent, the mother of the later Queen Victoria, and Princess Louise of Saxe-Gotha-Altenburg, Duchess of Saxe-Coburg, the mother of the later husband of Queen Victoria, Prince Albert of Saxe-Coburg and Gotha, during the births of their respective children.

== Tribute ==
On 9 June 1854, the birthday of Louis III, Grand Duke of Hesse, she was the only woman to be awarded the Knight Cross of the Order of Philip the Magnanimous. In Darmstadt, the Heidenreichstraße is named after her. Founded after her death in Darmstadt, the Heidenreich-von Sieboldsche Stiftung zur Unterstützung von armen Wöchnerinnen was later transformed into Darmstädter Stiftung für Wohltätigkeitszwecke’. Since 2006, the Medical Faculty of the University of Göttingen has launched the ‘Heidenreich von Siebold Programm’ to support female scientists.

The Charlotte Heidenreich von Siebold Prize, named after her, is awarded every two years by the Entega Foundation.

== See also ==
- Dorothea Erxleben
- Kusumoto Ine, distant relative of Charlotte von Siebold and the first female doctor of Western medicine in Japan
