= C. L. Lehmus =

German mathematician

Daniel Christian Ludolph Lehmus (July 3, 1780 in Soest – January 18, 1863 in Berlin) was a German mathematician, who today is best remembered for the Steiner–Lehmus theorem, that was named after him.

Lehmus was the grandson of the German poet Johann Adam Lehmus (1707-1788) and the Berlin-based physician Emilie Lehmus (1841-1932) was his grandniece. His father Christian Balthasar Lehmus was a science teacher and director of a gymnasium in Soest, as such he took it upon himself to school his son. From 1799 to 1802 Lehmus studied at universities of Erlangen and Jena. In 1803 he went to Berlin, where he was giving private lectures in mathematics and pursued further studies at the university, which awarded him a PhD in 1811. From December 18, 1813 to Easter 1815 Lehmus was employed as a lecturer (Privatdozent) by the university, but in 1814 he became a teacher for math and science at the Hauptbergwerks-Eleven-Institut (mining school) in Berlin as well. In 1826 he also assumed a teaching position at the Königlichen Artillerie- und Ingenieurschule (military engineering school) and was granted the title of a professor at that school in 1827. In 1836 he was awarded the Order of the Red Eagle (4th class). In addition to his two teaching positions Lehmus was giving lectures at the university until 1837 as well.

Lehmus wrote a number of math and science textbooks, best known was probably his Lehrbuch der Geometrie, which saw several editions. He published articles in various math journals, in particular he was a regular contributor to Crelle's Journal and provided an article for its very first edition in 1826. He published an elegant trigonometric solution of Malfatti's problem in the French math journal Nouvelles Annales de Mathématiques, but due to a copy error the author's name was given as Lechmütz.

In 1840 Lehmus wrote a letter to the French mathematician C. Sturm asking him for an elementary geometric proof of the theorem that is now named after him. Sturm passed the problem on to other mathematicians and Jakob Steiner was one of the first who provided a proof. In 1850 Lehmus came up with a different proof on his own. The theorem itself proved to be a rather popular topic in elementary geometry being a subject of somewhat regular publications for over 160 years.

== Works ==
- Aufgaben aus der Körperlehre. Berlin/Halle 1811
- Lehrbuch der Zahlen-Arithmetik, Buchstaben-Rechenkunst und Algebra. Leipzig 1816
- Lehrbuch der angewandten Mathematik. Volume I-III, Berlin 1818, 1822 (online copy volume I at Google Books)
- Theorie des Krummzapfens. Berlin 1818
- Die ersten einfachsten Grundbegriffe und Lehren der höheren Analysis und Curvenlehre. Berlin 1819
- Uebungsaufgaben zur Lehre vom Größten und Kleinsten. Berlin 1823 (online copy at Google Books)
- Lehrbuch der Geometrie. Berlin 1826
- Sammlug von aufgelösten Aufgaben aus dem Gebiet der angewandten Mathematik. Berlin 1828
- Grundlehren der höheren Mathematik und der mechanischen Wissenschaften. Berlin 1831
- Anwendung des höheren Calculs auf geometrische und mechanische, besonders ballistische Aufgaben. Leipzig 1836
- Kurzer Leitfaden für den Vortrag der höheren Analysis, höheren Geometrie und analytischen Mechanik. Duncker und Humblot 1842 (online copy at Google Books)
- Algebraische Aufgaben aus dem ganzen Gebiet der reinen Mathematik mit Angabe der Resultate. Duncker und Humblot 1846 (online copy at Google Books)
- Grenz-Bestimmungen bei Vergleichungen von Kreisen, welche von demselben Dreieck abhängig sind, sowohl unter sich als auch mit dem Dreieck selbst. C. Geibel 1851 (online copy at Google Books)
