= Steiner–Lehmus theorem =

Every triangle with two angle bisectors of equal lengths is isosceles

$|AE|=|BD|,\,\alpha=\beta,\, \gamma=\delta$ $\implies \triangle ABC \text{ is isosceles}$

The Steiner–Lehmus theorem, a theorem in elementary geometry, was formulated by C. L. Lehmus and subsequently proved by Jakob Steiner. It states:

Every triangle with two angle bisectors of equal lengths is isosceles.

The theorem was first mentioned in 1840 in a letter by C. L. Lehmus to C. Sturm, in which he asked for a purely geometric proof. Sturm passed the request on to other mathematicians and Steiner was among the first to provide a solution. The theorem became a rather popular topic in elementary geometry ever since with a somewhat regular publication of articles on it.

== Direct proofs ==
The Steiner–Lehmus theorem can be proved using elementary geometry by proving the contrapositive statement: if a triangle is not isosceles, then it does not have two angle bisectors of equal length.

There is some controversy over whether a "direct" proof is possible; allegedly "direct" proofs have been published, but not everyone agrees that these proofs are "direct." For example, there exist simple algebraic expressions for angle bisectors in terms of the sides of the triangle. Equating two of these expressions and algebraically manipulating the equation results in a product of two factors which equal 0, but only one of them (a − b) can equal 0 and the other must be positive. Thus a = b. But this may not be considered direct as one must first argue about why the other factor cannot be 0. John Conway has argued that there can be no "equality-chasing" proof because the theorem (stated algebraically) does not hold over an arbitrary field, or even when negative real numbers are allowed as parameters. A precise definition of a "direct proof" inside both classical and intuitionistic logic has been provided by Victor Pambuccian, who proved, without presenting the direct proofs, that direct proofs must exist in both the classical logic and the intuitionistic logic setting. Ariel Kellison later gave a direct proof.

== References & further reading ==
- John Horton Conway, Alex Ryba: The Steiner-Lehmus Angle Bisector Theorem. In: Mircea Pitici (Hrsg.): The Best Writing on Mathematics 2015. Princeton University Press, 2016, ISBN 9781400873371, pp. 154–166
- Alexander Ostermann, Gerhard Wanner: Geometry by Its History. Springer, 2012, pp. 224–225
- Beran, David (1992). "SSA and the Steiner-Lehmus Theorem". The Mathematics Teacher. 85 (5): 381–383. doi:10.5951/MT.85.5.0381. JSTOR 27967647.
- Parry, C. F. (1978). "A Variation on the Steiner-Lehmus Theme". The Mathematical Gazette. 62 (420): 89–94. doi:10.2307/3617662. JSTOR 3617662. S2CID 125461255.
- Lewin, Mordechai (1974). "On the Steiner-Lehmus Theorem". Mathematics Magazine. 47 (2): 87–89. doi:10.1080/0025570X.1974.11976361. JSTOR 2688873.
- S. Abu-Saymeh, M. Hajja, H. A. ShahAli: Another Variation on the Steiner-Lehmus Theme. Forum Geometricorum 8, 2008, pp. 131–140
- Pambuccian, Victor; Struve, Horst; Struve, Rolf (2016). "The Steiner–Lehmus theorem and "triangles with congruent medians are isosceles" hold in weak geometries". Beiträge zur Algebra und Geometrie. 57 (2): 483–497. arXiv:1501.01857. doi:10.1007/s13366-015-0278-y. S2CID 256110198.
