= Emilie Lehmus =

German physician (1841–1932)

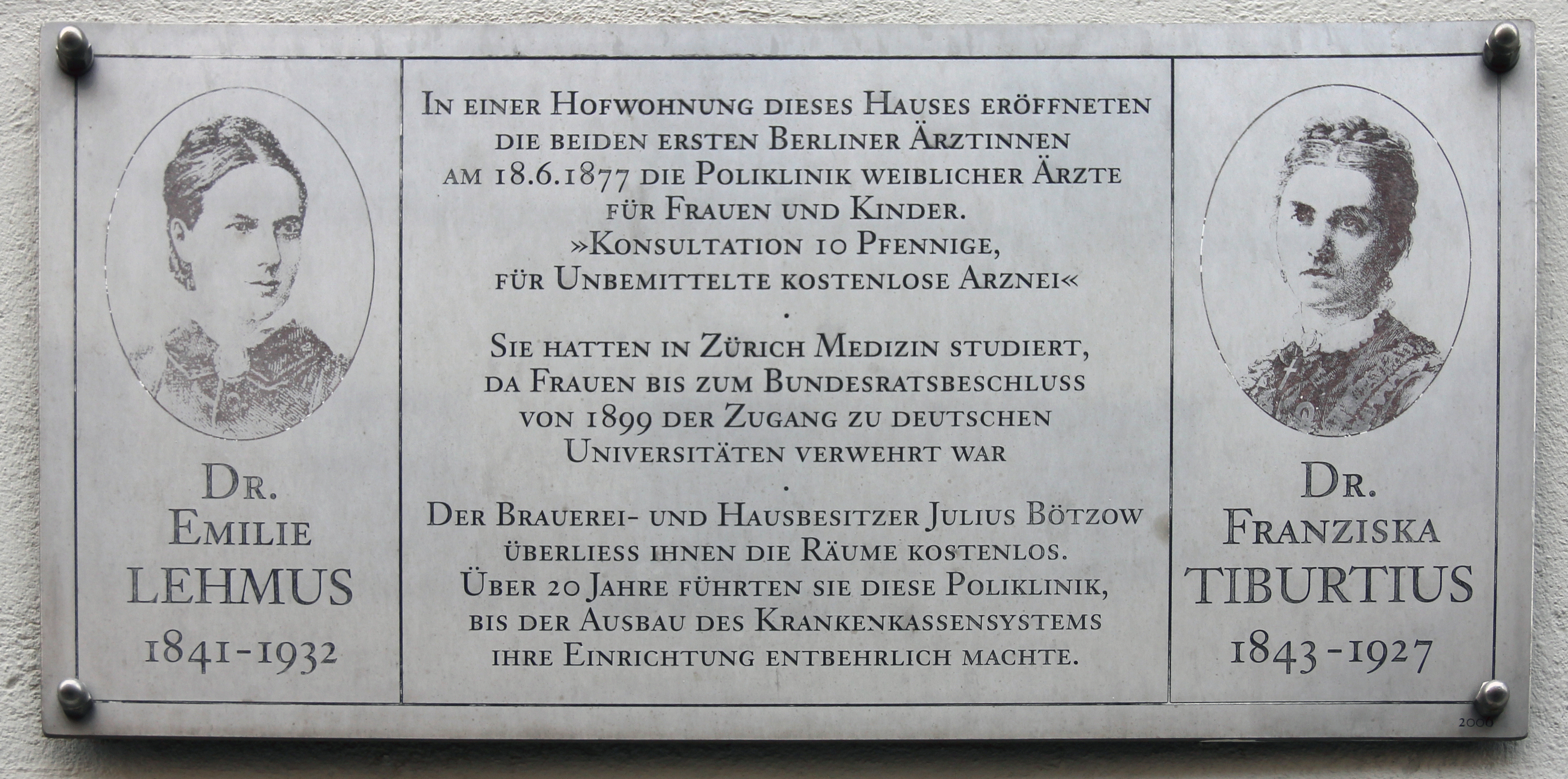
Memorial plate for Emilie Lehmus and Franziska Tiburtius in Berlin

Emilie Lehmus (30 August 1841 – 17 October 1932) was a German physician. She is known as the first female doctor in Berlin. She founded the first polyclinic for women and children in Berlin.

Her great uncle was the German mathematician C. L. Lehmus and the German poet Johann Adam Lehmus (1707-1788) was her great great grandfather.

== Life ==
Born to pastor Friedrich Lehmus in Fürth, Germany. Lehmus and her five sisters received advanced educations, unusual for women at the time. Upon completing school in Paris to become a language teacher, Lehmus taught at the Marienstift in Fürth.

Her sister introduced Lehmus to German female dentist, Henriette Hirschfield-Tiburtius, who convinced Lehmus to study medicine in Zurich. Lehmus chose to study medicine, specifically gynecology, to help women who were often afraid to be examined by their male doctors. By the time these women were examined after marriage, it was often too late.

Lehmus received her doctorate with distinction in 1870, becoming the first German woman to receive a medical degree from a Swiss University. Women had been permitted to attend lectures there since 1864, but until this point, most of the female students had been Russian. There were eight other women in her class. It was here that she met Franziska Tiburtius (1842 -1927), sister-in-law of Henriette Hirschfield-Tiburtius.

After school, Lehmus completed an internship with the gynaecologist and obstetrician, Franz von Winckel in Dresden. In 1877, Lehmus and Tiburtius established a women's clinic in Berlin-Mitte at Schönhauser Straße 23/24. Despite sustained opposition, including several court injunctions and slander, their clinic attracted a large clientele. In 1881, the two founded the "Poliklinik für Frauen," which was later expanded into a modern surgical clinic and offered young female doctors in particular training opportunities. Treatment at the clinic cost only ten pfennig and women who could not afford it were treated for free.

Around 1900 she was forced to give up her practice due to her own influenza pneumonia. When the Vereinigung weiblicher Ärzte was founded in 1908, Lehmus supported this initiative with a donation of 16,000 Reichsmark. After giving up her practice, she lived in Munich for several years after the First World War, then with her sister in Gräfenberg near Erlangen where she worked as a pianist. On 18 October 1932 she was buried at the municipal cemetery in Fürth, Erlanger Straße 97.
