= Regina von Siebold =

German physician (1771–1849)

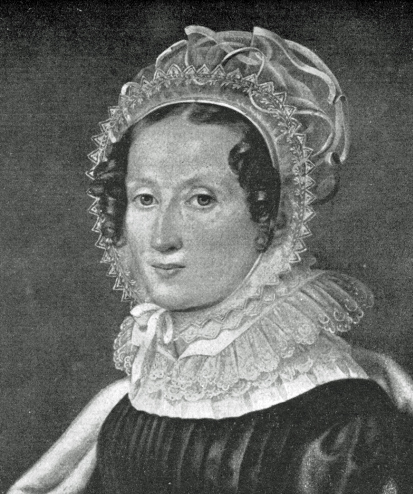
- Born: December 14, 1771; Geismar
- Died: February 28, 1849 (aged 77); Darmstadt

Regina Josepha von Siebold, née Henning (14 December 1771 – 28 February 1849), was a German medical doctor and obstetrician, born in Geismar. She was the first woman in Germany to receive a university degree.

She is buried in Darmstadt.

== Early life ==
Siebold was raised by her prosperous uncle Regierungsrat Lorenz Henning, a city councilman of Heiligenstadt who had no children of his own. He left her everything when he died and provided that his friend Georg Heiland would be her guardian. Regina Josepha married Heiland, though he was 25 and she was just 15. They had four children during their six years together, and Georg died around 1793 when Josepha was just 21. She and her only two living children, Charlotte and Therese were now on their own.

When she became very ill, Regina Josepha was placed in the care of Dr. Damian Siebold. He was working as an assistant to Professor Richter, in whose home Regina had lived when she was a student. Damian and his father, Carl Casper von Siebold were part of an imperial noble family in Würzburg. Regina Josepha married Damian in 1795, and the couple lived first in Worms and then in Darmstadt where Damian practiced obstetrics. The couple had three more children together before Damian started showing signs of mental illness. Eventually, he would become too ill to practice.

== Career ==
At a time when obstetrics was strictly a male profession, Regina Josepha wanted to pursue a profession in Obstetrics. She assisted her husband in his practice and with the influence and help of her father-in-law and uncle, began attending graduate courses on gynecology at the University of Würzburg. Though she was only allowed to listen to lectures from behind a curtain, Regina Josepha completed the required gynecology courses at the University of Würzburg. With her husband, she completed her practical obstetrics training. She appealed to the Grand Duke Ludwig IV of Hesse-Darmstadt to be allowed to take the final exam. With permission, she performed exceptionally well on the 4-hour exam. On November 28, 1807 Regina Josepha was further granted government license to work both as a doctor of obstetrics and as a midwife. In 1815, she was awarded by Ferdinand von Ritgen an honorary doctorate of medicine in obstetrics from the University of Giessen. She was the first woman in Germany to receive a university degree.

Siebold managed a medical clinic assisted by her daughter Charlotte Heidenreich von Siebold, who also received a degree in obstetrics from the University of Giessen in 1817. In 1819, Charlotte attended the Duchess of Kent in the delivery of a baby daughter, Alexandrina Victoria, later known as Queen Victoria, of England.

== Legacy ==
A crater on Venus is named after Regina Josepha von Siebold.
