= Lothar von Kunowski =

German painter

Lothar von Kunowski (8 December 1866 – 1936) was a German painter.

== Life ==
Born in Ober-Wilkau bei Namysłów, Provinz Schlesien, Kunowski, a director's son from Breslau, attended the Lateinschule in Halle, first completed scientific studies, then artistic training at the academies in Breslau and Munich, where he registered in 1895 as a pupil of the Malschule Marr. At the beginning of the 20th century he ran a private art school in Berlin and wrote books on art and techniques for art students. In 1909, Kunowski became professor and head of the state drawing teachers' seminar at the Kunstgewerbeschule Düsseldorf, which merged with the Kunstakademie Düsseldorf in 1919.

After leaving Berlin, Heinrich Richter-Berlin founded a painting school at the same address and continued to teach the System L. v. Kunowski there. He was married to the artist Gertrud von Kunowski (1877- 1960), who was involved in at least two of his programmatic book publications.

He published Durch Kunst zum Leben and Unsere Kunstschule. Durch Kunst zum Leben consisted of several individual volumes, the first two of which were entitled Gesetz Freiheit und Sittlichkeit des künstlerischen Schaffens and Ein Volk von Genies These two books were published by Rudolf Steiner in the Mitteilungen aus dem Verein zur Abwehr des Antisemitismus 1901, II. Jahrgang, Nr. 52, review. Steiner considered much of these writings immature and nothing newly conceived, but found the idealism expressed in them "refreshing in the highest degree." Whereas Kunowski's first work could have been misused to spread antipathy towards the people and the races, Steiner now noted with satisfaction that the author spoke out decidedly against Antisemitism and called on all peoples to create art - even if under the aegis of the Germans, as he proved with a Kunowski quote: "We Germans are determined that we reserve the form of the world to be remodelled for all peoples, that we summon them all to carry out the work, above all the Romans and Semites, to whom we owe infinite things, with whom, united in the infinite, we shall also extend the finiteness of the earthly together. In this loving justice lies the future of the German, his world empire lies secure, his rejuvenation into a new man, into a new people."

Kunowski also expressed himself programmatically on objects of daily use, such as the telephone: "The owner of the telephone or a telegraph will become a senseless chatterer unless the artful design of these apparatuses or their surroundings force him to entrust them only with worthy things".

== Students ==
Kunowski's students included Gerd Arntz, Otto Freundlich, Heinrich Kamps, Lothar Homeyer, Anton Lamprecht, Robert Pudlich, Heinrich Richter-Berlin, Kurt Hermann Rosenberg (1884–1975), Arnold Topp, Werner Vogel, Albert Wigand (artist), John Dähmcke, and Anton Räderscheidt.

== Bibliographie ==
- Durch Kunst zum Leben. Volumes 1–8. Eugen Diederichs Verlag, Jena DNB-IDN 998359300
  - Vol. 1: Gesetz, Freiheit und Sittlichkeit des künstlerischen Schaffens. 220 pages. Diederichs, Leipzig 1901 DNB-IDN 998359424
  - Vol. 2: Ein Volk von Genies. Jena 1901
  - Vol. 3: Schöpferische Kunst. Diederichs, Leipzig 1902
  - Vol. 4:
  - Vol.5: Licht und Helligkeit. With Gertrud von Kunowski. 390 pages. 8 plates. Diederichs, Jena 1906. DNB-IDN 99835936X
  - Vol. 6:
  - Vol. 7: Rhythmus und Bilderbogen. Grundsätze meiner Zeichenschule. Eugen Diederichs Verlag, Leipzig 1903
  - Vol. 8:
- Unsere Kunstschule. With Gertrud von Kunowski. 218 pages. Dr. Albrecht von Kunowski, Verlag für Nationalstenographie, 1910
- Orpheus : Philosophie der Kunst und Kunsterziehung. Diederichs, Jena 1925
- Die Kunsthochschule. Einführung in Lehrgang und Ziele. Verlag der staatlichen Kunstakademie zu Düsseldorf, Düsseldorf 1929
