= Johanna Tecklenborg =

German painter (1851–1933)

Johanne-Catharina Tecklenborg (6 June 1851 – 11 May 1933) was a German painter.

== Life and work ==
Born in Bremerhaven, Tecklenborg was the second daughter of the shipbuilder and shipyard owner Johann Carl Tecklenborg (1820-1873) and his wife Sophie (née Ehlers, 1827-1910). She was a pupil of Theodor Her and painted mainly landscape and still life, with which she made a name for herself. Her paintings are still traded at auctions today. Later, living in Munich, she, like many of her contemporaries, committed herself to the education of women artists. She taught at the Münchner Künstlerinnenverein and was for a time the head of the association. In 1914, she resigned from the chairmanship and participation in the committee due to the behaviour of some members. Her career as an artist is typical for a daughter from a "middle-class" home in Bremerhaven.

The Kunstmuseum Bremerhaven, newly founded in 1886, presented works by Tecklenborg in its first exhibition in the same year.

She worked for many decades promoting the Renten- und Pensionsanstalt für deutsche bildende Künstler and helped the organisation to continuously increase its membership.

Tecklenborg died in Munich aged 81 and was buried at Munich Waldfriedhof.

== Work ==
- Blick auf einen Weiler in flacher Landschaft.
- Blick vom Garten auf ein Städtchen mit Kirche (before 1914).
- In the Spa Gardens of Baden-Baden.
- Nachtliche Flusspartie mit Windmuhlen und Staffage.
- Zwei Mädchen bei der Mittagsrast am Waldesrand, Oil on canvas.
