= Franz von Winckel =

German gynecologist and obstetrician

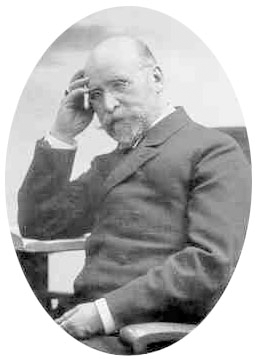
Franz von Winckel

Franz Karl Ludwig Wilhelm von Winckel (5 June 1837 – 31 December 1911) was a German gynecologist and obstetrician who was a native of Berleburg.

In 1860, he received his medical doctorate at the Friedrich Wilhelm University of Berlin, later becoming a professor of gynecology at the University of Rostock (1864). In 1872, he became director of the Königlichen Landesentbindungsschule in Dresden, and from 1883 onward, was director of the Frauenklinik at the Ludwig-Maximilians-Universität München. Among his students and assistants at the Ludwig-Maximilians-Universität München was gynecologist Josef Albert Amann (1866–1919).

His name is lent to "Winckel's disease", a disease originally described in the epidemic form in 1879. It has been referred to as "epidemic hemoglobinuria of the newborn". His name is also associated with a birthing maneuver known as the "Wigand-Martin-Winckel-Handgriff". The procedure is named in conjunction with Justus Heinrich Wigand (1769–1817) and August Eduard Martin (1847–1933).

He was the first president of the Deutschen Gesellschaft für Gynäkologie und Geburtshilfe (German Society for Gynecology and Obstetrics).

== Selected writings ==
- Die Pathologie und Therapie des Wochenbetts; later translated into English and published as "The pathology and treatment of childbed: a treatise for physicians and students" (1866).
- Lehrbuch der Frauenkrankheiten; later translated into English and published as "Diseases of women. A handbook for physicians and students" (1886).
- Die Krankheiten der weiblichen Harnröhre und Blase (Diseases of the female urethra and bladder), 1877
- Die Pathologie der weiblichen Sexual-Organe (Pathology of the female sex organs) Hirzel, Leipzig 1881.
- Handbuch der Geburtshülfe (Handbook of obstetrics) three volumes, Bergmann, Wiesbaden 1903–1907.
