= Horst Lange =

German author (1904–1971)

Horst Lange (6 October 1904 – 6 July 1971) was a German poet who published during the Third Reich and is regarded as an example of Inner emigration. His writings have been categorised as Naturmagie and his novel Schwarze Weide is regarded as an important example of magical realism, a modernist fusion literary style.

== Early life ==
Horst Lange was born on 6 October 1904 in Liegnitz, then a Prussian province. His father was chief clerk in the Prussian army, but suffered a nervous breakdown while serving during World War I. His mother came from a Roman Catholic family and instilled in Lange a love for poetry. In 1921 Lange ran away from home to join the Bauhaus school in Weimar. He dreamt of becoming a painter and was given an office job in the school by his uncle who taught architecture. At the school he met Paul Klee and Walter Gropius, Gropius advised him to focus on developing his literary talent. Lange returned to Liegnitz, finished school and in 1925 began studying art history, literature and theatre at the University of Berlin.

== Writings during the Weimar Republic ==
While studying and living in Berlin Lange published poems and short stories. His literary friends were Günter Eich and Martin Raschke, both published in the magazine Die Kolonne and would continue to publish non-conformist literature after the Nazis seized power. Lange briefly joined the Communist Party, and left Berlin to study art history in Breslau. In Breslau he met the poet Oda Schaefer with whom he formed a lifelong friendship. They had an open relationship and both pursued other affairs, which inspired their writings. In 1931 the couple moved to Berlin, openly opposed the NSDAP and distributed anti-Nazi stickers. When the Nazis seized power in March 1933 they were denounced by their neighbour and their apartment was searched.

Lange's published writings were regarded as Naturmagie (nature magic), where a magic sense unfolded within the realm of an ambivalent nature. This movement was connected with writers who published in the journal Die Kolonne between 1929 and 1932. Other members of the Naturmagie literary movement were Eich, Peter Huchel, Elisabeth Langgässer, Wilhelm Lehmann and Oskar Loerke.

== Writings during the Third Reich ==
The couple married in 1933 and Lange began work on his first novel. During the Third Reich Lange and Schaefer engaged in what has later been termed Inner Emigration. As intellectuals they remained in Germany and opposed the Nazi regime in varying degrees of openness. In 1935 the historian Sebastian Haffner tried to persuade the couple to follow him into exile, but Lange "felt tied to the German language".

Dark visions of the present were reinforced by Lang's fatalism. His most important work and his first novel was published in the autumn of 1937 under the title Schwarze Weide (Black Willow). In line with Schopenhauer's philosophy on fate, and in the absence of the invisible net (harmonia praestabilitata) with which all men are bound, Lange expressed the deep conviction "that all their hands and feet are tied". In this poetic work the story begins with the adolescent first-person narrator, plagued by his awakening sexuality. A sect dominates the local population of the area the protagonist left in his youth. While on a holiday on a country estate the narrator predicts but cannot prevent a murder he has seen in a vision. An innocent man is sentenced, while the murderer whips the local population into a hysterical frenzy. Omens, such as red snow, are interpreted as pointing to the end of time. Personal relationships are also infected with morbidity. All the while the origin of the protagonist's guilt is often his perceived sexual deformity. In the novel Lange confronts the reader with adultery, incest, faithlessness, lust, rape, and the feelings of guilt and self-incrimination. All these feelings reach far back into the past. The protagonist returns to the estate many years later, tortured by his conscience and the desire to atone his guilt in some way.

Schwarze Weide was enthusiastically received by authors such as Ernst Jünger, Hermann Hesse and Gotfried Benn. Schaefer later wrote that Lange gave the main protagonist key features of Adolf Hitler. Until then a level of cultural and journalistic pluralism prevailed in Germany. During the 1936 Summer Olympics in Berlin the Nazi regime concealed its radical tendencies and aesthetic modernism was tolerated so long as it was not political. But in the summer of 1937 the Nazis' exhibition on Degenerate Art caused a shift in cultural policy. Lange wrote to a friend "I remain what I am: a degenerate artist". Schwarze Weide has been named as an important magic realism novel. This literary movement comprised young authors who had stayed in Nazi Germany, were bitterly disappointed with the Weimar Republic and explored in their works the modernist fusion of rationality and irrationality, with a tendency to the hermetic and magic. Magic realism remained important in post-war Germany and was developed further by authors such as Wolfdietrich Schnurre and Günter Grass.

== Writings during the Second World War ==
In 1940 Lange's second novel was published Ulanenpatrouille (Ulans' Patrol). In it he wrote "one had to be exposed to whatever the ... dark and formless powers had decided, one could not free oneself, and one was obliged to accept it, even if it meant death itself, which would thrive upon it."

Lange was drafted for World War II in 1940 and worked as a writer in a training unit. Frustrated with his work he willingly accepted a posting as a soldier-reporter to a 6th Army pioneer unit in September 1941. Shortly before beginning his military service Lange noted in his diary on 22 May 1940 "I... submit to whatever may happen". In his diary and letters Lange used the concepts of barbarism (Barbarei (de)) and decline (Niedergang) to draw the picture of "sinking worlds". In his perception the world suffered from the enduring absence of God, while demons were dangerously present. His worldview was influenced by dualism, the contrast between light and darkness, spirit and body, love and sexuality. On 29 July 1943 Lange wrote in his diary "The apocalypse has already existed for a long time next to our bourgeois cosiness, the plush sofa. Fire falls from the skies and the disorder which man has caused is growing to infinity." On Christmas Eve of 1943 he wrote in his diary:

Today no gods are visible. And if they were visible, one would not believe in them anymore. This mankind is therefore so helpless and so abandoned that it falls prey to its seducers without resistance, because they are no longer capable of separating good from evil.

On 8 October 1944 Lange noted in his diary "The hysteria is increasing from hour to hour. The madness festers behind every normal expression of life. The apocalyptic beasts are ready to devour us all". Following a speech he had heard by Heinrich Himmler, Lange noted in resignation on 5 March 1945 "Nothing more can be hoped and nothing can ever be put right. That has to be eradicated". He laments Himmler for "washerwoman-superstition" and his "low-down manner of deprivation of man". In Lange's imagination the last days of the world preceded the Last Judgement, which had been brought about by the "middle-class antichrist" Hitler.

But like many young German poets Lange defied the technical and military coldness of everyday life. He and others set a gentle and warm harmony of feeling above the world of facts. Lange published eleven prose pieces in newspapers and magazines from 1936 to 1944. Lange was regarded as a Zwischenreichautor (author of an intermediate realm) and his prose like that of Stefan Andres, Werner Bergengruen and Wolfgang Weyrauch was very popular. Their works received excessively positive reviews in the press and Nazi publications. Lange benefited from the lack of uniformity in Nazi literary policy. Provided the author did not openly criticise the Nazi state or the NSDAP various niches existed for the publication of expressionist or left-wing views.

In January 1944 Lange published the novella Die Leuchtkugeln, a collection of three stories with intensive regard for characters. The fate of the foredoomed central character, named Hermes, is preceded by an inner spiritual passivity. Hermes is a successful organist-composer who volunteers for front duty following a creative crisis. The whole frontline experience is for the character a revelatory detour on an already begun journey of self discovery.

During his front service Lange was wounded, losing the sight of one eye. In 1944 Schaefer's son from her previous marriage was reported missing in action. Lange and Schaefer lived in Berlin and intensified their creative efforts. Both wrote poems, Lange's Cantata to Peace was distributed in secret. But in March 1945 Lange was transferred to Mittenwald in Bavaria, where he was ordered to work on a film version of Die Leuchtkugeln. Thus the couple did not witness the fall of Berlin a month later. Mittenwald capitulated to the US Army and the couple stayed there until they moved to Munich in 1950.

== Post-war period and legacy ==
When Alfred Andersch assessed German literary output during the Nazi reign in 1947 he categorised Ricarda Huch, Gerhart Hauptmann, Rudolf Alexander Schröder, Hans Carossa and Gertrud von Le Fort as older and established poets who had stayed in Germany and upheld a tradition of "bourgeois classicism". Andersch counted Lange alongside the poets Stefan Andres, Hans Leip, Martin Raschke and Eugen Gottlob Winkler among the younger generation who stayed in Germany and contributed to the resistance against Nazi authorities with their literary work.

The political moto in the Federal Republic of Germany was "no experiments" and German poets imitated the old masters Kafka, Proust, Robert Musil and Karl Kraus, while conjuring up a metaphysical unity. Ernst Kreuder wrote to Lange on 2 March 1946 that "The old emigrants are concerned with a naturalistic working through of the Nazi period. But now we need another frame of mind". Lange published two significant novels after the war. Ein Schwert zwischen uns (A Sword Between Us) was published in 1952 as an indictment of moral corruption and materialism in post-war Germany. Verlöschende Feuer (Dying Fires) was published in 1956 and was set in Berlin during the air-raids. It described a doomed young couple in the last phase of the war. Ultimately Lange was marginalized in the post-war German literary scene. He died on 6 July 1971 of a haemorrhage.

The publication of Lange's war diaries in 1979 generated new interest in his work. In the 1980s Schwarze Weide and Die Ulanenpatrouille were reprinted. Lange is now recognized as a key figure of the "Inner Emigration".
