= Elisabeth Langgässer =

German lyricist, prosaist, and short story writer

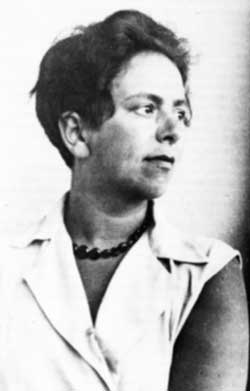
- Elisabeth Langgässer in 1932
- Born: 23 February 1899; Alzey, Grand Duchy of Hesse, German Empire
- Died: 25 July 1950 (aged 51); Karlsruhe, West Germany
- Occupations: Writer, Poet, Teacher, Journalist
- Partner(s): Hermann Heller (1928); Wilhelm Hoffman (m. 1935)
- Children: Cordelia Edvardson, Annette, Barbara, Franziska
- Writing career
- Years active: 1924–1950
- Notable awards: Literary Prize of the German Citizens' Association 1931; Georg Büchner Prize; 1950

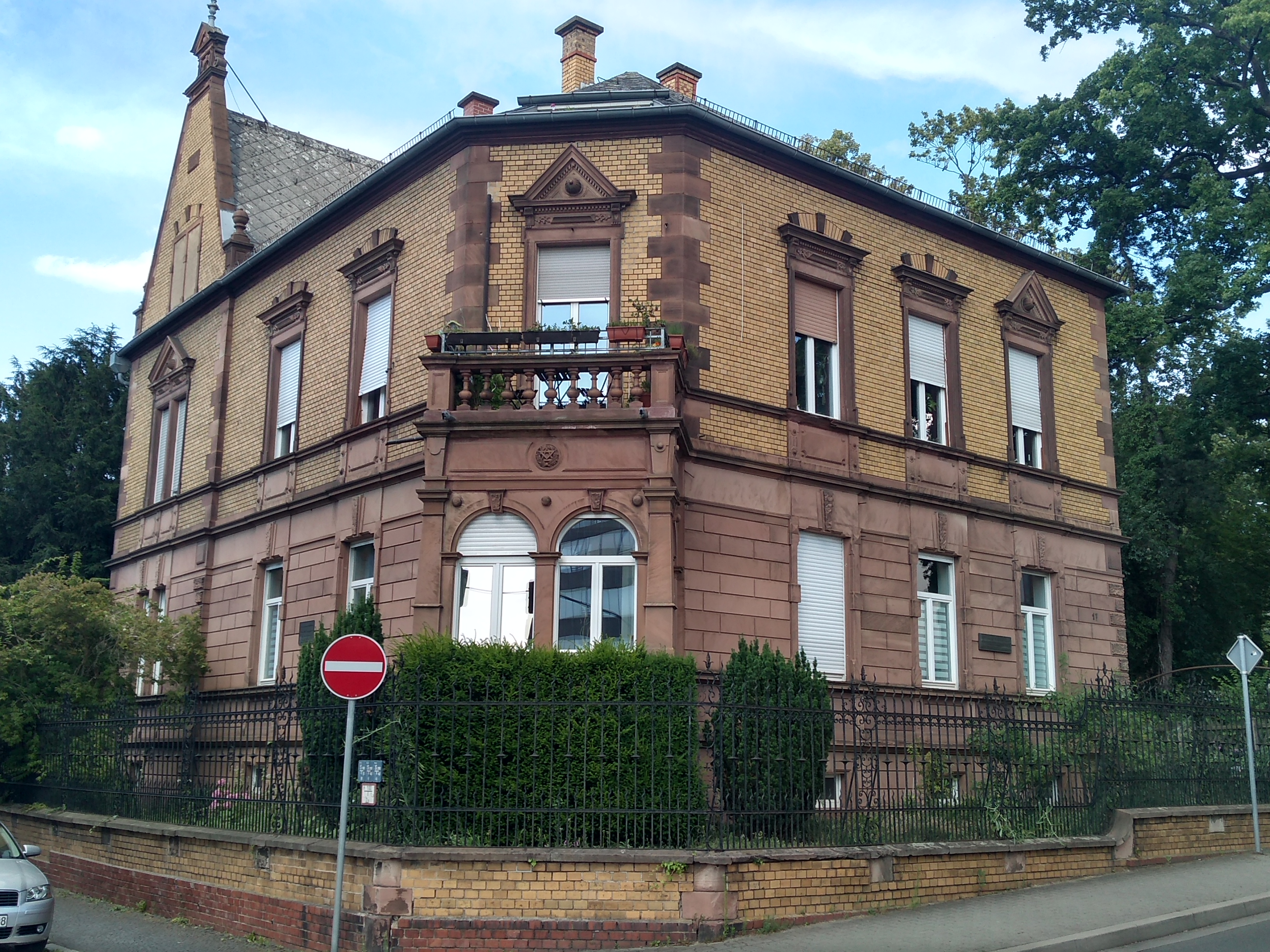
The childhood home of Elisabeth Langgässer, in Alzey, Friedrichstraße 17

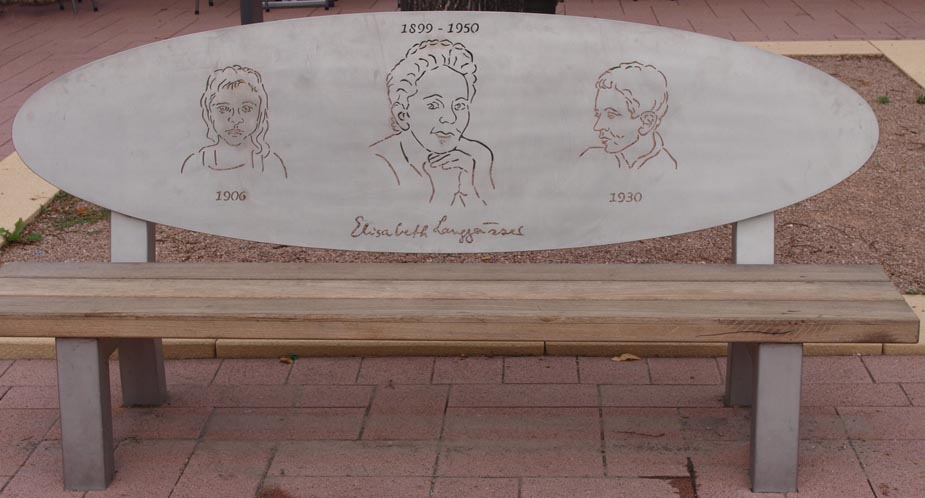
The Langgässer Bench in Alzey

Elisabeth Langgässer (23 February 1899 – 25 July 1950) was a German author, journalist and teacher. She is known for lyrical poetry and novels.

Her short story Saisonbeginn, for example, provides a graphically human portrayal of a 1930s German Alpine village erecting a sign forbidding the entry of Jews.

== Early life ==
In 1899 Langgässer was born in Alzey into a middle-class Roman-Catholic family. Her father was building inspector, architect Eduard Langässer (1846–1909), son of the commercial broker Coloman from Mainz and Barbara Lebrecht. Her mother was Eugenie Maria Pauline Dienst (1859–1942), daughter of the Senior Court Secretary Paul Dienst from Mainz and Maria Anna Rauch. She had a younger brother, Heinrich (1901–1946).

In 1909, after her father's death, the family moved to Darmstadt, where Langgässer attended school and graduated from all-girl Viktoriaschule high school. After a year of teacher training, she taught at Hessian grade schools in Seligenstadt and Griesheim from 1920 until 1928.

Following a brief affair with the married legal scholar Hermann Heller, she gave birth to her illegitimate daughter Cordelia in January 1929. As a consequence she was sacked from her teaching position.

== Publications during the Weimar Republic ==
From 1924 onwards Langgässer published poetry and reviews. After losing her employment as a teacher she devoted herself to a literary career. From 1929 to 1930 she was a lecturer at the Social Women's School in Berlin, where she remained permanently after retiring as a freelance writer.

Her writings were regarded as Naturmagie (nature magic), where a magic sense unfolded within the realm of an ambivalent nature. This movement was connected with writers who published in the journal Die Kolonne between 1929 and 1932. Other members of the Naturmagie literary movement were Günter Eich, Horst Lange, Peter Huchel, Wilhelm Lehmann and Oskar Loerke and the married couple Oda Schaefer and Horst Lange.

== Persecution in the Third Reich ==
Langgässer became a member of the Reichsschrifttumskammer (Reich Chamber of Literature). In June 1935 Langgässer married Wilhelm Hoffman and together they had three daughters. Langgässer was classified as a "half-Jew" due to Jewish relations on her father's side of the family. She was banned from any writing or publishing activity by the Reich Chamber of Literature in 1936 on racial grounds. She appealed to Hans Hinkel in August 1937 and then to Joseph Goebbels in April 1938. In the appeal letters she makes reference to the pure Aryan line on her mother's side and points to the criticism of her literary work by the Jewish author Alfred Döblin. After her death the letters were used as evidence for Langgässer's willingness to compromise, accusations that she had prostituted herself politically, or were interpreted as interventions by a Catholic German citizen who had not yet seen where fascist Germany was heading.

Ultimately the marriage in 1935 to Wilhelm Hoffman (1899–1967), Dr. phil., lecturer at the Germersheim Institute of the University of Mainz; which she had met in Berlin while working as a radio editor in 1933; saved Langgässer from deportation. They had three daughters; Annette (b. 1938), Barbara (b. 1940) and Franziska (b. 1942).

However, her eldest daughter, Cordelia, whose father was a prominent Jew, was considered fully Jewish according to the Nuremberg Laws; made to wear the yellow star of David in 1941 and not allowed to live with her family. Cordelia was deported aged 15 to Theresienstadt concentration camp and then to Auschwitz in 1944. Cordelia survived following an exchange of camp inmates with German prisoners in Sweden and came back in 1946.

== Literary work ==
Langgässer's poetry thrives on the tension between diverse forces that accrued to the poet from her Rhenish-Hessian origins, her Jewish family heritage, and a lifelong commitment to the Roman-Catholic faith. The dominant theme of her poetic work, which drew inspiration from the artists of the "Renouveau Catholique," especially Paul Claudel and Georges Bernanos, was the transforming power of grace, which frees humanity from the eternal cycle of the natural cosmos to existence under the Christian telos. Langgässer found her genuine poetic expression in poetry. In a letter dated September 7, 1947, to Wilhelm Lehmann, who remained her lifelong role model, she even confessed that her great novels were "not written in prose at all, but rather a suspended rhythm." Her first creative period was therefore entirely devoted to poetry. The focus is the cycle "The Tropic of the Lamb: A Hymn to Redemption," published in 1924. In it, she counters the paradoxical contradiction of creation, with its threat to humanity from cthtonic-telluric powers, with a commitment to the Christian message and attempts to resolve the incompatibility of nature and faith within the "church year," whose Sundays and festivals she accompanies with hymns of celebration.

The center of her second creative period is also a lyrical cycle, "The Zodiac Poems," in which "nature appears alone with itself" (letter to her future husband, Dr. phil. Wilhelm Hoffmann, Summer 1934) and all beings, doomed to destruction, sigh for salvation. Closely thematically linked to this cycle of poems—all of Langgässer's novels and short stories are grouped around one of the lyrical cycles—this represents the understanding of Langgässer's poetry. Her important prose work "Proserpina" (1933; original version published in 1949), described as a "childhood myth," bears autobiographical elements and, interweaving his own childhood with the mythical figure of "Proserpina", archetypal depicts the eternally recurring fate of women, reflecting the cycle of growth and decay, of birth and death. – While in the prose collection “Triptych of the Devil, A Book of Hate, Stock Market Gambling and Unchain” (1932), which was written around the same time, and especially in the novella “Mars”, man surrenders himself to the demonic forces of nature welling up from the dark depths and sinks into an orgiastic frenzy, in the novel “The Walk Through the Ried” (1953, 1981), published in 1936 and linking the second and third creative periods, a profound change is indicated in that man begins to sense the possibility of redemption from the chthonic numina: In his search for his identity, the – negative – hero of the novel with the suggestive name Aladin, who has lost his memory and suffers from an early guilt of which he is only dimly aware, finds active love and thus a new meaning through the grace-filled encounter with creatures in need of his attention and its existence.

The motif of a "metamorphosis to Christian existence" (Wilhelm Hoffmann), first heard in this novel, has its roots in Langgässer's life story and artistic development and becomes the defining theme of a third creative period, beginning around 1936 and lasting until 1945. This third creative period, which again begins with a lyrical work, the annual cycle "The Leaf Man and the Rose" (published in 1947), about which she reports in a letter to Wilhelm Lehmann dated November 24, 1942: "But since the 'Zodiac Poems,' a decisive change has occurred in me. My new verses are purely religious; they are mystery poems that, in and with the images of nature, revolve around that mysterious center signified by the dogma of the 'Immaculate Conception'... This 'Rosa mystica-Maria' is contrasted with unredeemed nature as the 'Leaf Man.'" The more she understood her work as a medium for "expanding the event of redemption" (November 23, 1935), the more the structural problems of modern Christian poetry became more important to her. Thus, she developed a new genre in poetry, "the Christian mystery poem as a Christian nature poem" (to Erich Fried, November 1947). Similarly, she also wanted the novel "The Indelible Seal" (1946, 1979), which she wrote under excruciating conditions primarily during the war and which rightly earned her the reputation of being Germany's most important Christian poet, to be understood as Christian "mystery poetry," as "something completely new in form and content" (November 2, 1943). The novel's plot, which has only one motif, the salvation-historical one, which unfolds in ever new approaches - the Jew Lazarus Belfontaine, who decides for God in baptism, demonstrates, among the manifold temptations of the satanic, the indelibility of God's gracious care in the sacrament of baptism - demonstrates Langgässe's rejection of the traditional fable, which in her case can only be an explication of the history of salvation: "How the individual behaves in the struggle between God and Satan, how he or she enters their system of reference in an existential and by no means providential way, that forms the so-called fable" (Possibilities of Christian Poetry - Today, 1948).

Consequently, in her novel, Langgässer refrains from presenting her central theme, the rebirth of fallen humanity, | also by refraining from the presentation of rational reasons and psychological developments, so that her characters represent more archetypal elements. The reader—to whom the dedication "Commystis committo" is addressed—is drawn beyond "mere comprehension" into the struggle between God and Satan and thus compelled to participate in the process of salvation.

A key element of Langgässer's struggle for the "new state of freedom and redemption" (July 28, 1948) is her exploration of the events of the war years, the persecution of Jews, the bombing campaign, and forced labor, in a series of short stories, some of which bear autobiographical elements. Some of the harshly realistic narratives, collected in the collections "The Torso" (1947) and "The Labyrinth" (1949), have become integral parts of today's school reading as models of literary reckoning with the past; for example, "The Beginning of the Season," "In Submerge," and "The Faithful Antigone." Here, as well as in the poem "Spring 1946," in which—mythically transfigured—she gives moving expression to the return home of her daughter Cordelia, long lost in Auschwitz, the poet professes forgiveness for the injustice she suffered. The dominant theme of her poetic work, which received inspiration from the artists of the "Renouveau Catholique," especially Paul Claudel and Georges Bernanos, and whose richness of form testifies to Langgässer's intensive efforts to develop new poetic expressions of Christianity adequate to the modern worldview, remained, even in the final phase of her life, the transforming power of grace, which frees people from the eternal cycle of the natural cosmos to existence under the Christian telos. Thus, Langgässer evaluates her poem "Daphne at the Solstice," which belongs to her unfinished final collection of poetry, "Metamorphoses" (1951), as a "completely new stage in my development," as her first truly "Christian nature poem," insofar as she succeeded in "incorporating the Christian cosmos into my ancient natural world; rather, in transforming this nature through the Christian perspective" (letters of July 28 and August 25, 1948). The aim pursued here, a reconciliation of ancient myth and Christian truth— Langgässer, for example, interprets the solstice as the common kairos of John the Baptist and Apollo —is also evident in her last work, the novel "Märk. Argonautenfahrt" (1950, 1981), which depicts the journey of guilty humanity to the place of expiatory redemption: Seven people, each entangled in a grave sin, find each other seemingly by chance in the Summer of 1945 on their way from devastated Berlin to the Anastasiendorf Monastery and, equally in their failure and in the fulfillment of their path, testify to the salvation-historical victory of God's grace over the adversary's realm. The work particularly clearly demonstrates the entirely unorthodox poetic interpretation of Christian beliefs, which was the cause of the sometimes vehement criticism of her work and—in the case of the novel "Das Unauslöschliche Siegel" (The Indelible Seal) — even entailed the danger of its being banned by the Catholic Church. She completed the novel a few weeks before her death.

Literary Prize of the German Citizens' Association (1931); Büchner Prize (1950, posthumously); Member of the Association of Science and Literature in Mainz (1950).

== Post-war years ==
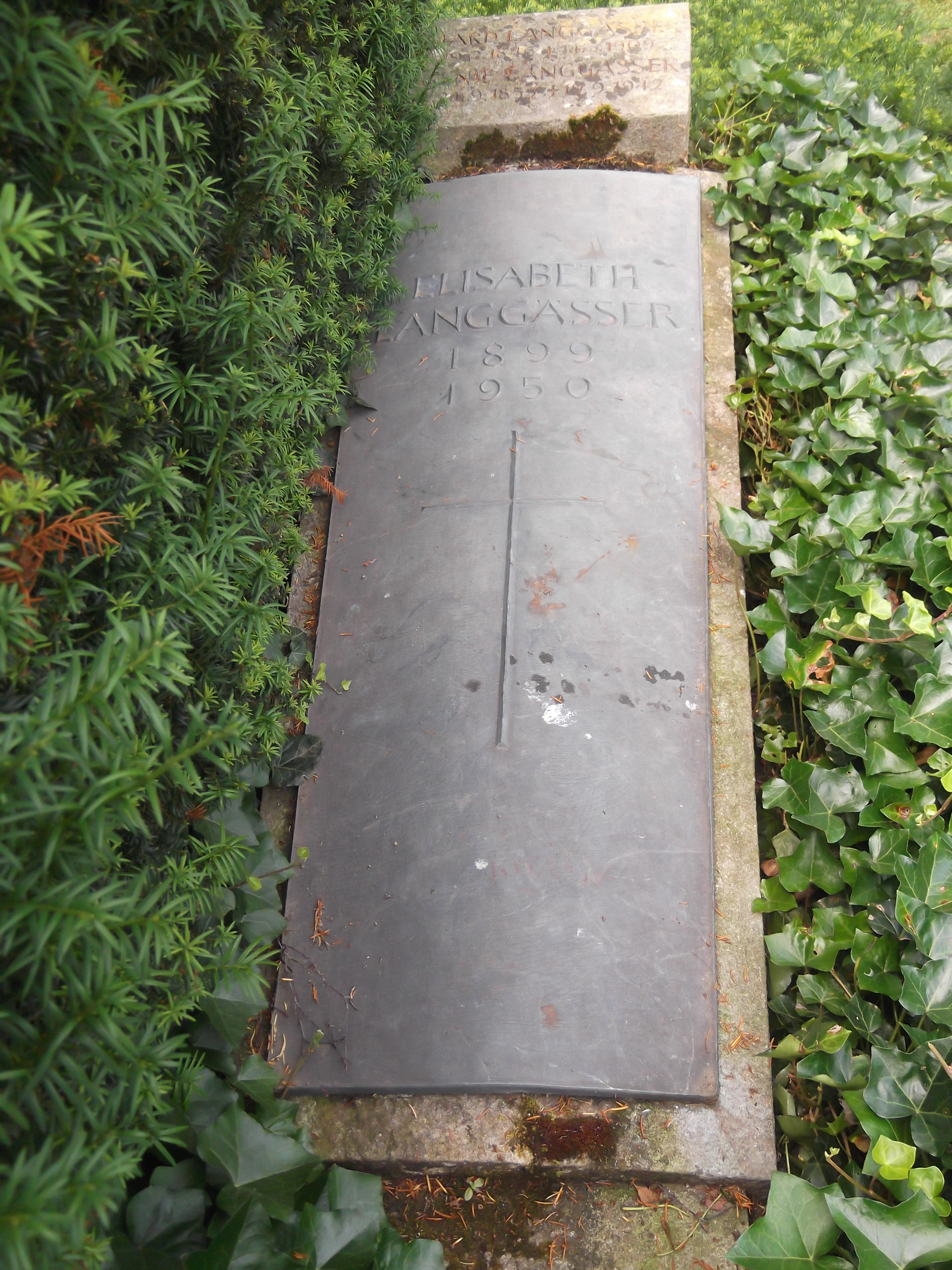
Elisabeth Langgässer's tomb in the Alter Friedhof (Darmstadt) (The Old Cemetery)

Langgässer wrote and publish prolifically in the immediate post-war years. Her most famous works were published shortly after the war. She became known as an author of the Inner emigration because she stayed in Germany during the Nazi reign, opposed the Nazi doctrine but was not outwardly critical of it. She continued to write until just before her death from multiple sclerosis on 25 July 1950. Following her death Langgässer was posthumously awarded the Georg Büchner Prize in 1950.

== Legacy ==
As a well-known pre-war author who became victim of the Nazi racial laws Langgässer received a lot of public and academic attention after her death. Her works found fame and a readership in the immediate post-war period. Less noted have been her letters, which were published by her husband after her death in 1954 under the title ...soviel berauschende Vergänglichkeit: Briefe 1926–1950 (...so much intoxicating transience: Letters 1926–1950). Langgässer's letters were republished by her granddaughter Elisabeth Hoffmann, the daughter of Cordelia, in 1990. The letters give an insight into the effects the Nuremberg Laws on her family and cover the period from 1933 until 1945.

Langgässer's daughter Cordelia had several children with a Swedish Protestant, becoming Cordelia Edvardson. She immigrated to Israel at the height of the Yom Kippur War in 1973 and wrote a searing autobiography, Burnt Child Seeks the Fire.

The Elisabeth Langgässer Literature Prize, named after her, has been awarded every three years by the city of Alzey since 1988.

== Works ==
- Der Wendekreis des Lammes (Poems), 1924.
- Proserpina (Narrative), 1932. New edition Hofenberg, Berlin 2022, ISBN 978-3-7437-4342-7
- Grenze. Besetzes Gebiet, Ballade eines Landes. First edition in 1932 published by Morgenland-Verlag by Rahel Bin-Gorion and her son Emanuel Bin-Gorion, new edition Elsinor Verlag, Coesfeld 2023, ISBN 978-3-942788-76-2. The book provides a vivid insight into life in 1923 under French occupation in the Mainz bridgehead.
- Triptychon des Teufels - Ein Buch von dem Hass, dem Börsenspiel und der Unzucht, W. Jess, Dresden 1932. New edition Hofenberg, Berlin 2021, ISBN 978-3-7437-4092-1
- Die Tierkreisgedichte (Poems), 1935.
- Der Gang durch das Ried (Novel), 1936. New edition Hofenberg, Berlin 2023, ISBN 978-3-7437-4640-4
- Rettung am Rhein. Drei Schicksalsläufe, 1938.
- Das unauslöschliche Siegel (Novel), Claassen&Goverts, Hamburg 1946. (Here she addresses the fate of her Jewish father, who was baptized.)
  - dtv-Pocket book: München 1989, ISBN 3-423-11116-X.
  - New edition Hofenberg, Berlin 2023, ISBN 978-3-7437-4658-9
- Der Laubmann und die Rose (Poems), 1947.
- Der Torso (Short-stories), 1947. New edition Hofenberg, Berlin 2021, ISBN 978-3-7437-4120-1
  - Untergetaucht
  - Glück haben
  - Saisonbeginn
  - Nichts Neues
- Das Labyrinth (Short-story), 1949.
- Märkische Argonautenfahrt (Novel), 1950.
- Gesammelte Werke (5 vols), posthumous 1959–1964.
- Ausgewählte Erzählungen, posthumous 1984, Claassen, ISBN 3-546-45837-0.

== See also ==
- Christa Wolf
