= Schwarze Weide =

1937 novel by Horst Lange

- Author: Horst Lange
- Language: German
- Publisher: Goverts Verlag
- Publication date: 1937
- Publication place: Germany
- Pages: 540

Schwarze Weide (lit. 'Black Willow') is a 1937 novel by the German writer Horst Lange. It is set in a village near Liegnitz and follows a young man who observes and has visions about murder and religious fanaticism. The novel is associated with magical realism and inner emigration.

The novel was well-received at publication. German critics who praised it stressed its European qualities. Wolfgang Koeppen has called it the "most significant epic statement of the Hitler era that had nothing to do with the era itself". Writing about Schwarze Weide in 2021, Klaus-Rüdiger Mai of Die Tagespost associated the initial reception with subtle opposition to National Socialism and called it Lange's most important novel.

== See also ==
- Salix myrsinifolia
