= Oda Schaefer =

German writer and journalist

Oda Schaefer (really Oda Lange, born December 21, 1900, in Berlin-Wilmersdorf as Oda Krus; died September 4, 1988, in Munich) was a German writer and journalist.

== Life ==
Oda Schaefer was the daughter of Eberhard Kraus, one of the early Baltic writers and journalist, and his wife Alice Baertels, who came from a merchant family in Estonia. Oda Schaefer attended a secondary school in Berlin and then went to a private arts school for training in graphic design. She then worked as a commercial artist. In 1923, she married the painter Albert Schaefer-Ast, with whom she had a son in 1924. The marriage ended after a short time in divorce. In 1926, Schaefer moved for family reasons to Liegnitz. There she met the writer Horst Lange, with whom she returned to Berlin in 1931 and married in 1933.

From 1928, Schaefer wrote fashion magazine articles, poems, and plays. During the Third Reich she was with Lange and Günter Eich in the circle around the literary magazine The Column, which was affiliated with Inner Immigration, a movement of writers and artists who were opposed to National Socialism but did not leave Germany. Peter Huchel and Elisabeth Langgässer were close friends with her at this time. Works by her appeared in the journal The Interior Kingdom, and the Frankfurter Newspaper. Schaefer was a member of the Reich Chamber. Although Shaefer and her husband were opponents of the Nazi regime, and helped Jews by hiding them for a while, at the same time they wrote for officially sanctioned publications.

In the aftermath of World War II, Oda's son was missing and her husband was severely injured. They lived for a while in the middle of a forest and then in Switzerland, before going to Munich in 1950, where she freelanced for various newspapers and broadcasts.

Schaefer's literary work consists primarily of poetry in traditional forms inspired by the naturalist poet Wilhelm Lehmann and George von Vring. With Horst Lange she wrote Trümmerliteratur of the post-war period along with the authors of the Group 47.

Schaefer, a member of the Deutsche Akademie für Sprache und Dichtung in Darmstadt and the PEN Center of the Federal Republic of Germany, received in 1951 a prize of the Academy of Sciences and Literature; in 1952, the Honorary Prize of the Bavarian Academy of Fine Arts; in 1955, Literature Prize from the Society for the Promotion of German Literature; in 1959, Literature Prize from the City of Munich; in 1964, the Federal Cross of Merit, First Class; in 1975, Literature Prize of the Cultural Committee of the Federal Association of German Industry; and in 1973, the Schwabing Art Prize.

Schaefer's biography inspired her grand-nephew Chris Kraus for his feature film The Poll Diaries, with Paula Beer in the lead role.

== Works ==
- The Wind Harp. Berlin 1939
- Earthly Conduct. Munich 1946
- The Chestnut Bud. Munich 1947
- Unparalleled Rose. Stuttgart 1948
- Cat Walk. Munich 1956
- Grass Tune. Munich 1959
- The Boutique. Munich 1963
- Ladies Only, or From the Art of Being a Woman. Zurich 1963
- And You Ask Me, What Love Is. Munich (inter alia) 1968
- Also if You Dream, the Time Goes. Munich 1970
- The Green Clay. Munich 1973
- The Skin in the World. Munich (inter alia) 1976
- The Vibrant Festivities Over Grief. Munich 1977
- Recurrence. Munich (inter alia) 1985
- Ballads and Poems. Munich 1995

== Works about Shaefer ==
- Ulrike Leuschner (2005). "Schaefer, Oda". Neue Deutsche Biographie (in German). Vol. 22. Berlin: Duncker & Humblot. pp. 510–511.
- Monika Bächer: Oda Schaefer (1900–1988). Leben und Werk. Aisthesis, Bielefeld 2006, ISBN 3-89528-563-3.
