= Union of Slavic Forces of Russia =

Union of Slavic Forces of Russia Союз славянских сил Руси
- Abbreviation: USSR (English); СССР (Russian)
- Leader: Sergei Taraskin
- Founded: 2010
- Banned: 19 August 2019
- Preceded by: Conceptual Party "Unity"
- Headquarters: Zelenograd, Moscow, Russia
- Membership (2018): 150,000
- Ideology: Soviet nationalism Denial of the dissolution of the USSR; Russian irredentism Pan-Slavism; Anti-Semitism; Anti-Americanism
- Colours: Red; Gold

Party flag

The Union of Slavic Forces of Russia (USSR; Russian: Союз славянских сил Руси; СССР; Soyuz slavyanskikh sil Rusi, SSSR), also known by various other names, (Note: Alternate names include:Back home to the USSR, Union of Soviet Socialist Republics, Citizens of the USSR, Government of the USSR, Soviet Citizens, Witnesses of the USSR, necro-communists, and necromancers.) are a network of conspiracy theory-oriented political groups across Russia and the post-Soviet states whose supporters believe that the dissolution of the Soviet Union was illegal and invalid and that the USSR (or Russian Empire) continues to exist as a legal entity in international law; as a result, they believe the present Russian Federation is illegitimate.

Adherents promote various conspiracy theories. Many are adherents of Slavic Native Faith and express antisemitism. Some also believe in theories traceable to QAnon or the German Reichsbürger movement. According to the Russian Federal Security Service (FSB), there were some 150,000 followers of the movement in 2018. In 2019, the Supreme Court of the Komi Republic identified the Union of Slavic Forces of Russia as an extremist organization. The movement's founder, Sergei Taraskin, proclaimed himself to be President of the USSR and Emperor of Russia among other titles, and appointed followers to various supposed positions. Since his imprisonment various other groups have emerged, most of which claim to be the legitimate government of the former territory of the USSR.

== History and ideology ==
=== Taraskin group ===
The movement was started in 2010 by Sergei Taraskin (born 1962) of Dushanbe, owner of a Zelenograd dental clinic. Taraskin, also known as "Fire God Taraskin" and "Owner of the Universe", said that he is a "citizen of the USSR, a descendant of subjects of the Russian Empire, Tsardom of Russia and other pre-existing subjects of law in our country Russia (Rus', Tartaria, Borea, Scythia, and so on), a descendant of the noble breed of Slavs, who is covered by the mantle of Alexander Filippovich, Tsar of Macedon, Sovereign of the Monarchy".

The clinic lost its investor, fell behind on the rent, and Moscow authorities ordered its eviction. Taraskin appealed the eviction in Moscow Arbitration Court, and declared himself "interim President of the USSR". He also said that he was "Emperor and Commander-in-Chief of the Russian Empire", and vowed to fulfill the obligations undertaken "until all structures, bodies and organizations of these entities are legitimately (lawfully) restored, after which I am willing to voluntarily resign from myself these obligations." He issued an order about a "Third World War", which would stop a theoretical NATO offensive against the USSR and prevent the armed forces of the military-political bloc from entering the country, and promised 10 kilograms (22 lb) of gold for the "elimination" of the president of any state providing assistance to NATO and 5 kilograms (11 lb) for a general. Taraskin wanted to revive the KGB and SMERSH, and said on September 18, 2015: "Each of you will certainly answer for all your actions and your inactions during this period in X-hour ... all your inaction will be interpreted against you". His group's ideology is based on the German Reichsbürger movement and anti-Semitic conspiracy theories, including the forged Protocols of the Elders of Zion. Religious scholar Roman Silantyev identified similarities between the two movements:

Reichsbürger movement	Witnesses of the USSR
1. The Federal Republic of Germany is not a sovereign state, but a private company (GmbH, or "limited liability company").	1. The Russian Federation is not a sovereign state, but a kind of limited liability company (Closed Joint-stock company, or CJSC).
2. The Greater German Reich still exists today.	2. The Union of Soviet Socialist Republics still exists today.
3. After the end of World War II, Germany did not sign a peace treaty.	3. There are no legitimate documents on the liquidation of the USSR.
4. The Basic Law for the Federal Republic of Germany, which was transformed into a Constitution after the reunification of Germany, is not a (valid) Constitution. Only the 1919 Constitution of the German Reich and the 1933 act is valid.	4. The Constitution of Russia exists only in the form of a draft, and the 1993 Russian constitutional referendum was illegitimate. Only the Constitution of the Soviet Union, whether it be the 1936 constitution or the 1977 constitution, is valid.
5. The German government is controlled remotely from the United States.	5. The government of the Russian Federation is actually an offshore company registered in Delaware and controlled remotely from the United States.

From 2010 to 2016, Taraskin appointed his supporters to the posts of prime minister, ambassador-at-large, interim head of the Ukrainian SSR and "governors" of over 10 constituent entities of the Russian Federation; the latter includes Volgograd Oblast, Sverdlovsk Oblast, Krasnodar Krai, Krasnoyarsk Krai, and the Tatar ASSR.

Taraskin held a December 2016 meeting of his "government of the USSR" in Chelyabinsk, where he and "presidential administration" head Valery Ryzhov issued attendees "USSR passports" and promised that when the USSR was restored, the government would pay each of them 14 billion rubles. The meeting participants pledged their property to the USSR. Roman Silantyev said that Taraskin and his supporters sold permits for the sale of alcoholic beverages for half a million "occupation rubles" which, after seizing power, would be worth 560 tons of gold. According to Silantyev, "In addition to trolling judges and law enforcement officers, [movement adherents] create serious problems for power engineers, gas workers and utilities, refusing to pay for their services ... in the Trade Union of the USSR group, you can easily buy a 'Soviet' trade union card and for 200 rubles of monthly contributions to its card, [and] feel free from many burdensome expenses ... only until the forced shutdown of light and heat". The group's "Ministry of Internal Affairs" sells "Soviet" license plates, "Soviet" driver's licenses and vehicle inspection coupons. A complete set costs "only 19 thousand "bibariks (Bank of Russia tickets), which supposedly gives full immunity from GIBDD officers." Taraskin's supporters created an online store in Barnaul, and collected donations in Kursk to fight "myths" about HIV.

=== Other groups ===
Movement participants later created dozens of groups, most with a quasi-religious and neo-pagan focus and ideas borrowed from Ancient Russian Church of Orthodox Old Believers-Ynglings founder and head Alexander Khinevich and Konstantin Petrov's Conceptual Party "Unity".

==== Torgunakov group ====
A well-known participant in the movement was Sergei Torgunakov (born 1978) of Novosibirsk, who proclaimed himself Jesus Christ, Quetzalcoatl, Thoth, interim head of Novosibirsk Oblast, head of the oblast's Central Internal Affairs Directorate, head of the judiciary, and legislator. In 2011 and 2012, to publish his book The Second Coming of Jesus Christ in 2012, Torgunakov took loans from Alfa-Bank of about 200,000 and 600,000 rubles (in March 2016, prosecutors charged that the loans exceeded 1 million rubles) and other sources. After studying "documents on the Internet", he concluded that repayment was not required because "the country [USSR] and its inhabitants were robbed" and Russian rubles were worthless. Torgunakov wrote to a bank manager, "Think how many billions of dollars in losses your bank will incur if your clients find out that your bank has filed a lawsuit against Jesus Christ, declaring me a debtor and almost a fraud" and proposed a joint advertising campaign posing as Jesus Christ. Refusal was threatened with death and the implementation of the Book of Revelation. After Torgunakov sent a number of letters, the judicial system began to deal with his debts.

He began agitating and propagandizing, meeting with like-minded people and sending letters to bankers and officials. Torgunakov promised to make the kingdom of God from the renewed USSR, proclaimed himself "the head of all churches in the world", anathematized Pope Francis, called Vladimir Putin the Antichrist and said that instead of the Bible and the Koran, everyone must obey the 1977 USSR Constitution. He demanded that all clergy pass an examination and said that all religious organizations should change to the Russian language and refuse to use frankincense, which he considered the strongest narcotic. He threatened opponents with the Last Judgment and the eruption of the Yellowstone supervolcano.

In early 2015, preparing for a trip to Moscow, Torgunakov was repeatedly refused a room at the Radisson Royal Hotel. He finally found a simple room at the Izmailovo Hotel in exchange for labor, since he had no income.

On November 23, 2015, Torgunakov and Olga Selyutina went to the Novosibirsk police to convey "the last orders of the authorities of the RSFSR" and was committed to a psychiatric hospital with a diagnosis of paranoia. Although his doctors said that his "behavior is unpredictable and poses a danger to others", he was discharged in early February 2016. Torgunakov wanted to challenge his diagnosis in court and receive €2,000 from his doctors for each day he was hospitalized. He continued his activities as the self-proclaimed interim president of the USSR.

A "Supreme Soviet of the USSR" group, headed by Valentina Reunova, appeared in 2018. Reunova declared Taraskin a usurper. The "government of the USSR" (Shefantsov-Radist) group is headed by "general radnik of the Cossacks of Russia" A. Radist, who demands that the Russian Orthodox Church's Yekaterinburg Diocese grant the controversial former Schema-Hegumen Sergius the freedom to propagandize.

== Legal problems ==
A Yekaterinburg resident told the Fourth Channel TV journalists about "swindlers" who nearly succeeded in forcing her elderly father to re-register her apartment, garage and car with them. According to her, the pensioner gave them a copy of his passport, a military ID and 2,500 rubles of "state duty" and received a document granting him citizenship in the USSR. A resident of Chelyabinsk told OTV channel reporters that a relative influenced by Taraskin's supporters gave the "government of the USSR" "several tens of thousands of rubles." Ten Nizhny Tagil residents petitioned the court in April 2017 to recognize them as citizens of the USSR and filed claims against the city's Ministry of Internal Affairs, which refused to return their Soviet passports.

The FSB Directorate for the Central Military District opened a January 2018 criminal case for incitement to extremist activity (Article 280 of the Criminal Code of Russia) against Andrey Zlokazov, the self-proclaimed head of "Sverdlovsk Oblast of the RSFSR" (part of the Union of Slavic Forces of Russia). Zlokazov had sent letters at the end of February 2016 to the commanders of a number of military units calling for the organization of "self-defense squads"; if they refused, he threatened to "eliminate them as enemies of the USSR." He also made and sold "USSR passports" and other documents, and USSR license plates. In April 2019, the Ordzhonikidze District Court in Yekaterinburg found Zlokazov insane and committed him to a psychiatric hospital.

In July 2018, Taraskin and associate Alexander Solovyov were detained by officers of the FSB military counterintelligence service and the Zelenograd center for countering extremism who searched Taraskin's apartment. According to law-enforcement agencies, "audio and video materials about the activities of the organization 'USSR', documents, stamps, and printing products were seized." The criminal case was entrusted to the Investigation Department of the Central Military District FSB. On November 27, 2020, the Zelenograd court sentenced Taraskin to house arrest until December 25 of that year.

In 2019, the Supreme Court of the Komi Republic identified the Union of Slavic Forces of Russia as an extremist organization. Alexander Tyurnin, who called himself the head of the "security service" of the regional "USSR" organization in Komi and "Chairman of the KGB of the Komi ASSR" was sentenced to two-and-a-half years in prison for publicly advocating extremist activities, posting extremism on social networks, and calling for violence against government officials (including drawing up "shooting lists").

In May 2020, a fraud case was opened in North Ossetia against a group of people who called themselves the "Supreme Soviet of the Ossetian ASSR" and sold "USSR passports" with the promise that the documents would exempt purchasers from taxes and utility bills. The Investigative Committee of Russia for Kirov Oblast opened a June 2020 criminal case against three Kirov residents for organizing the activities of an extremist organization. According to the investigation, they conducted activities of the banned Union of Slavic Forces of Russia, held meetings and sold "inserts confirming citizenship in the USSR." The three were detained by SOBR officers; two were released on their own recognizance, and the third was held.

Two months later, two members of the Union of Slavic Forces of Russia were detained in Noyabrsk (YaNAO) and charged with "organizing the activities of an extremist organization". In September of that year, police, National Guard and Centre E in Krasnodar prevented an assassination attempt on the head of the Kuban branch of the Federation of Jewish Communities of Russia by the "Supreme Court of the USSR". According to Roman Silantyev, the group is one of the most aggressive necro-communist offshoots; "its leader, Marina Melikhova-Meshcheryakova, a witch by profession, has been in custody since the spring of this year", and "she was charged under Part 2 of Article 280 Criminal Code (public calls for extremist activity), including calls for violence against the Jewish community of Krasnodar". Silantyev said that "they were going to encourage the killer with the position of a [Soviet] "minister or even head of the KGB". The group was responsible for COVID-19 riots in North Ossetia during quarantine and makes "court decisions" calling the Russian Federation a terrorist state.

In November 2020, the Volgograd Central District Court arrested two movement participants for organizing the activities of an extremist organization. One, regional cell leader Sergei M., called himself "Acting Head of all positions without exception, all without exception previously existing objects and subjects of law in the space on the territory of the Volgograd Oblast". The following month, a court in Ulyanovsk gave a 62-year-old local resident who was "Acting Head of the Ulyanovsk Oblast of the RSFSR" in the "Union of Slavic Forces of Russia (USSR)" from September 2019 to February 2020 a five-year suspended sentence for participation in the activities of an extremist organization.

== See also ==
- Sovereign citizen movement
- American militia movement
- Inner emigration
- Reichsbürger movement
- Irish republican legitimism
- Freeman on the land movement
- Neo-Sovietism
- Neo-Stalinism
- Pseudolaw
