= Conceptual Party "Unity" =

Russian political party

Conceptual Party "Unity" Концептуальная партия «Единение»
- Abbreviation: CPU (English); КПЕ (Russian)
- Leader: Konstantin Petrov
- Founders: Konstantin Petrov; Natalya Apalkova
- Founded: July 2000; 26 years ago
- Banned: 13 July 2007; 19 years ago
- Succeeded by: Union of Slavic Forces of Russia
- Headquarters: 68/10th Building, Leninsky Avenue, Moscow, Russia. 119296
- Newspaper: Measure for measure
- Ideology: Concept of Public Security "Dead Water"; Conspiracy theory Occultism; Neopaganism; Neo-Stalinism; Antisemitism; Anti-Christianity; Anti-Western sentiment
- Political position: Far-right
- Colours: Blue

Website
- kpe.ru

The Conceptual Party "Unity" (KPE; Russian: Концептуальная партия «Единение»; КПЕ; Kontseptual'naya partiya «Yedineniye», KPE) was a political party in Russia from 2000 to 2007. It advocated for the interests of a new religious movement of an occult and conspiracy theorist nature called the "Concept of Public Security" (KOB). The party's leader was retired Major General of the Space Forces of the Russian Armed Forces Konstantin Petrov (volkhv Meragor; 1945-2009).

In the 2003 Russian legislative election, the party won 1.2% of the popular vote and no seats. The Supreme Court of the Russian Federation liquidated the party on 15 May 2007, citing failure to prove the required registration numbers. Some key texts of the KOB are banned in Russia and included in the Federal List of Extremist Materials.

Since 2012, the party has been active as the Russian Public Movement "Course of Truth and Unity" (Russian: Российское общенародное движение "Курсом правды и Единения"), chaired by Sergey Kamenev.

== History ==
=== Creation ===
Igor Norchenko, a member of the Central Committee, cited the "People's Movement for the Power of God", created in 1997, as the "forerunner" of the KPE.

Initially, the party was called "The All-Russian Political Public Organization - All-People's Party of Peaceful Will "Unity"". In July 2000, a founding congress was held in Perm, and on 24 September 2002, the organization was registered by the Russian Ministry of Justice, founded by General Konstantin Petrov and entrepreneur Natalya Apalkova.

The name "Conceptual Party "Unity"" was adopted at an extraordinary congress, which took place in April 2002 in Zvenigorod.

=== Participation in elections ===
The party participated in the 2003 Russian legislative election and won 1.17% of the vote. The top three of the federal list of candidates, in addition to party leader Konstantin Petrov, included Vladimir Gribov, General Director of Independent Gas Company LLC, and Dmitry Poltoratsky, composer and singer-songwriter. Among other well-known persons, the federal list includes Viktor Yefimov, General Director of the 1st Petersburg Macaroni Factory, and Valery Pyakin, Editor-in-Chief of the Measure for Measure newspaper.

During the televised debate, Petrov announced support for the party by the new religious movement "Ringing Cedars of Russia" ("Anastasia"). He also stated that he sees the Lord's Prayer as an appeal to Satan, that the Russian Orthodox Church is a sect, and that astrology should be returned "to the bosom of mathematical sciences."

Representatives of other political forces accused the party of "sectarianism" (Natalya Narochnitskaya, Rodina Bloc) and "inciting religious hatred" (Yuly Nisnevich, "New Course — Automobile Russia"). The leader of the party "For Holy Rus'", Sergei Popov, on air on Public Russian Television, described the ideology of the KPE as "Satanism" and also accused the party of using quasi-scientific and quasi-medical terminology in its program, similar to that used in the materials of new religious movements.

=== Liquidation ===
On 15 May 2007, the Supreme Court of the Russian Federation satisfied the claim of the Federal Registration Service for the liquidation of the party. The reason for the liquidation was cited as an insufficient number of registered members at the time of verification in several regions.

On 10 July 2009, at the founding congress in the sanatorium "Vysokiy Bor" near Rzhev, on the same ideological basis, former members of the KPE created a public organization - the Russian People's Movement "Course of Truth and Unity" (ROD KPE).)

On 20 November 2013, the Lefortovo District Court of Moscow recognized the book Dead Water, the Concept of Public Security as extremist material. By decisions of other courts, the KPE books published under its publishing brand "Academy of Management" were also declared extremist:

- Petrov K.P. Secrets of Humanity Management or Secrets of Globalization. Volume 1, volume 2. - Moscow: NOU "Academy of Management", 2008.
- The religious studies of the Soviet era are the most humane religious studies in the world. Tutorial. Forecasting and Analytical Center of the Academy of Management. - Moscow: NOU "Academy of Management", 2010.
- And you will look for someone to sell yourself to, but there will be no buyer for you... - Moscow: Academy of Management, 2008. - 63 p.
- Non-Russian "Spirit" for the Russian soul. Church sociology and church spirituality. - Public initiative, 2005. - 359 p. - (Management Academy).

In addition, the Khostinsky District Court of Sochi recognized as extremist the books of the anonymous group of authors "Internal Predictor" (VP):

- Internal Predictor of the USSR. Liberalism is the enemy of freedom. - St. Petersburg: Public initiative, 2003.
- Internal Predictor of the USSR. To the Divine Power... - St. Petersburg: Public Initiative, 2004.
- Internal Predictor. From corporatism under the veil of ideas to catholicity in God's power. - St. Petersburg: Public initiative, 2003.

=== Doctrine ===
The Concept of Public Security "Dead Water" (Russian: Концепция Общественной Безопасности "Мертвая Вода") is a religiopolitical doctrine named after the magical water from Russian folklore that heals the wounds of the dead. The doctrine was first elaborated by the sacerdotal council called the Priestly Centre of the Internal Prophet of the Soviet Union, possibly existing since 1985 in Leningrad. The doctrine was incorporated as the Conceptual Party "Unity" (Концептуальная Партия Единение), officially recognized in 2001, and the base of supporters organized themselves into the popular movement Towards the Power of God (К Богодержавию).

After the party's liquidation, the Moscow branch and other branches of the movement refused to join the new movement, and some incorporated as the Association of Supporters of the Public Security Conception (Объединение Сторонников Концепции Общественной Безопасности). The Dead Water movement's goal is to liberate Russia from Jewish ideas. Classical Russian literature, such as the work of Alexander Pushkin, is sacralized, and Dead Water adherents propose rejecting Judeo-Christian terminology from the Russian language. Anti-Christianity, antisemitism, anti-Westernism, and anti-communism are combined with an exaltation of Joseph Stalin's ideology.

== Theoretical platform ==
The theoretical platform of the KPE is a set of documents called the "Concept of Public Security "Dead Water"" (abbreviated as "KOB", "KOBa" - it coincides with the party nickname of Joseph Stalin, whose activities, like those of Henry Ford, are cited as an example of effective management) - a socio-political development of an anonymous group (Note: It is indicated that it included K. P. Petrov, E. G. Kuznetsov, Yu. I. Slashchinin, M. N. Ivanov, S. A. Lisovsky, V. V. Matveev — Е. Мороз. Язычники-сталинисты или «Концептуальная партия „Единение“» ; however, V. M. Zaznobin, "Unknown". Archived from the original on 24 April 2011. who openly declares his participation in the team of authors, indicates that they are (or were) only ideological supporters; also in the publications of the VP of the USSR it is said that the team of authors adhered and continues to adhere to complete anonymity — Об имитационно-провокационной деятельности. 2001. С. 147—148.) of authors called "Internal Predictor of the USSR".

In the documents of the KPE, the abbreviation "USSR" stands for "Holy Cathedral Just Russia" (Святая Соборная Справедливая Россия). (Note: The abbreviation "USSR" can be deciphered in two ways: both as "Holy Cathedral Just Russia" and as "Union of Soviet Socialist Republics": Е. Мороз. Язычники-сталинисты или «Концептуальная партия „Единение“». The documents also contain the decoding "Holy Cathedral Just Rus'" - see the document: Программа Народного Движения «К Богодержавию») In the materials of the VP of the USSR, the decoding of the abbreviation "USSR" is not given. (Note: The materials of the VP of the USSR indicate that the activities of the group of authors continue under the same name, despite the end of the USSR: О Концепции общественной безопасности вкратце)

The Internal Predictor has existed since 1985-1987. The future leader of the party, Konstantin Petrov, joined the ranks of its supporters in 1994. The concept was discussed during parliamentary hearings in the State Duma in November 1995.

The basis of the concept includes the following works of the VP of the USSR in descending order of priority:

- Dialectics and atheism: two incompatible essences
- Dead Water
- From corporatism under the cover of ideas to sobornost in God's power
- Principles of personnel policy: states, "anti-states", public initiative
- Why, calling to the Divine Power, the Inner Predictor does not accept the Last Testament
- Our language: as an objective reality and as a culture of speech
- We need a different school.

The "Concept of Public Security" is positioned as a concept that analyzes ideologies, creeds, scriptures, and the chronology of historical events; the methodology of cognition, the "Sufficiently General Management Theory" (DOTU), economic theory, a look at theology, philosophy, the global historical process, psychology, pedagogy, and sociology have been developed. The authors present their vision of the second semantic series using pre-existing works of art (in particular, The Master and Margarita, Ruslan and Ludmila, and The Matrix).

According to the developers of the concept, the name "Dead Water" echoes Alexander Pushkin's poem "Ruslan and Ludmila": if you pour "dead" water on a bleeding wound, the wound stops bleeding; only after that it was necessary to pour "living" water - then the dead heroes came to life. Without the "dead" water, the hero could have died again due to unhealed wounds. In addition, sometimes water is presented as an image of information; "dead water" is a written text, while "living water" is "live" communication.

Both before the creation of the party and after its liquidation, analytical notes and books related to the concept of public security were regularly published (by 2009, more than 50 books and more than 200 analytical notes were published under the pseudonym "VP USSR").

The primary goal of the party was to govern Russia and, ultimately, the world under the religiopolitical Conception of Public Security "Dead Water" (Концепция общественной безопасности Мёртвая вода) and Sufficiently Universal Theory of Ruling (Достаточно общая теория управления).

=== Parliamentary hearings on KOB ===
Thanks to the support of speaker Ivan Rybkin, the supporters of the KOB achieved parliamentary hearings in the State Duma of Russia on November 28, 1995. The "Recommendations of the Parliamentary Hearings" on the issue of the "Concept of Public Security" include the following:

1. To recommend to the President of the Russian Federation, the Government of the Russian Federation, the Parliament of the Russian Federation, and public associations to familiarize themselves with the proposed concept of public security in Russia and start its public discussion in the media, in the classroom.
2. To ask the President of the Russian Federation to propose to the world community and the UN to hold in 1996 in Kirov an international congress on the public security of the planet.
3. To propose to the deputies of the State Duma to adopt a resolution on creating a special expert commission from representatives of all committees of the State Duma to evaluate the Concept of Public Security of Russia and develop the law "On National Security".
4. To recommend to the Federal Assembly to issue a joint statement of the two chambers on the prohibition of propaganda of aggression and violence in the media. To adopt a resolution on the recertification of journalistic personnel and technical personnel of the media in order to assess their past activities, knowledge of social psychology, the ability to create in journalistic work not to destroy, but to create, to be guided by the highest interests of information security of the state, society, and man.
5. In the State Duma Committee on Security, it is advisable to have an appropriate substructure, the functions of which will differ from those of the Committee on Information Policy.
6. To recommend starting the development of the law "On Information Security" since the central media of the Russian Federation have become one of the main sources of danger to the country's public security and continue to wage an undeclared war against their people.
7. To recommend to the new composition of the State Duma the holding of parliamentary hearings on the topic "The Concept of Public Security" at the very beginning of its activity, taking into account the comments and proposals received at the parliamentary hearings, as well as from the ministries and departments of the constituent entities of the Federation, from deputies and individual citizens.

— The concept of public security in Russia // Duma Bulletin. 1996. No. 1. S. 137.

Thus, contrary to the statements of the KPE supporters, (Note: See, for example: Краткие сведения о КПЕ on the official website.) at these parliamentary hearings, the concept was not "approved and recommended for implementation," but it was recommended to familiarize oneself with and discuss the concept. During the hearings, O. A. Bektobegova, Deputy Chief of Staff of the Moscow City Duma, noted that "an expert assessment is definitely needed." On the official website of the party and in other materials distributed by it, there are no reports of any specific measures of state bodies aimed at implementing or applying the "Concept of Public Security" taken as a result of the hearings.

=== Conceptual power ===
In the lectures of the leader of the KPE, Konstantin Petrov, "Secrets of the management of mankind", read in 1997-2004, outline some of the main provisions of the KOB, with world history viewed as a "controlled process". In the annotation to them, it is stated:

The series of lectures includes a presentation in modern language of the ancient worldview and philosophical positions hidden from humanity and their comparison with the existing ones. False concepts and ideas are exposed, and true ones are substantiated and proved. From these positions, an analysis is made of the history of humanity as a controlled process and the role of Russia in this process. The origin of humanity, its history, and the purpose of its existence are revealed.

The term "conceptual power" was formulated by the VP of the USSR in two meanings:

1. As the power over society of a certain concept, according to which public self-government is carried out;
2. As the power of specific people who carry the following functions:
  - recognition of factors exerting environmental pressure on society;
  - formation of vectors of goals in relation to the factor exerting pressure;
  - the formation of an expedient, purposeful function of management in structural and unstructured (Note: The ideologuse of KPE use the term structureless, see Пояснение о грамматике) ways; that is, the concept of managing the achievement of the goal of the development of society.

The ideology of the KPE includes the notion of the existence of a "world conspiracy" (which is structureless), a "world behind the scenes", etc. - a "global (Judean) predictor ("pre-indicator"), created 3500 years ago by 22 ancient Egyptian priests-hierophants, which also exercises leadership over the "World Masonic Government", and which includes "not only (and primarily not so much) people, but a complex of knowledge of a global level of significance."

The "global predictor" is a subject that, to the extent of its understanding, implements "conceptual power" (the power of ideas that dominate society and people who form, understand, and implement these ideas) on society. To solve the main problems of Russian society, supporters of the KPE point to the need for Russia to acquire its own "conceptual power". According to the ideologists of the party, the "world government" is now headed by "a small group of world financial tycoons." The materials distributed by the party spoke about other conspiracies: for example, about the plan of "alcohol genocide of the Russian people," carried out since ancient times by the Christian church with the introduction of parishioners to the use of wine, including through the ritual of "wine communion".

== Criticism ==
The group of authors "Internal Predictor of the USSR" criticized the activities of KPE and the lectures of Konstantin Petrov for distortions of the original meaning of the VP of the USSR. For example, in the course of the lectures "The Secrets of Mankind Governance", Petrov repeatedly cites the Rothschilds as an example of a representative of the global predictor; however, the works of the VP of the USSR directly indicated that the billionaire clans do not belong to the global predictor of conceptual power.

In 2007, the party was liquidated as a legal entity. Since 2012, the organization has been operating in the form of the Public Movement "Course of Truth and Unity" (KPE). In 2013, in Nizhny Novgorod Oblast, at the Dubki tourist center in the village of Krasny Baken, Vyksa district, a rally of movement activists took place, where the Federal Security Service seized party literature and books on the Concept of Public Security (KOB). In 2014, searches were carried out in Chelyabinsk on members of the KPE.

The party has been described as a neo-pagan religious cult with explicit totalitarian communist agenda. Although the party was neo-pagan, this aspect was not prominent in its activities, and many supporters were not neo-pagan.

== Election results ==
=== Legislative elections ===
Election	Leader	Votes	%	Seats	Rank	Status
2003	Konstantin Petrov	710,721	1.17	0 / 450	11th	Extra-parliamentary

== Sources ==
- Popov, Igor (2016). Справочник всех религиозных течений и объединений в России [The Reference Book on All Religious Branches and Communities in Russia] (in Russian). Archived from the original on 22 March 2020.
- Sorokina, V. "Концепция Общественной Безопасности (КОБ)". Saint Petersburg: Center for Apologetic Research.
