= Saisonbeginn =

The short story "Saisonbeginn" by Elisabeth Langgässer was published in 1947 as a part of the collection Der Torso. It deals with the antisemitism of the inhabitants of a small town that is revealed through the installation of a sign at the entrance to the town. The story is classified as Trümmerliteratur, or literature that was written shortly after the Second World War.

The main plot of the story deals with finding the best location for the sign. The story begins by describing a small mountain town preparing for the onset of the tourist season. Because the sign should serve as the first sight for all those entering the town, the workmen decide it should be placed next to the wooden crucifix. While the workmen are installing the sign, they are helped by schoolchildren, who happen to pass by. When the sign is finally in place, nuns, men and women come by to admire it. For most of them it makes no difference what the sign says; for others, it is a source of amusement.

At the end of the story the sign is standing firmly in the ground. The three workmen look at the sign and they are pleased, for on the sign they read, "In this town Jews are not wanted."

== Interpretations ==
The story describes not only the placement of the sign, but also the reactions of the residents who are not opposed to the placement of such sign.

Elisabeth Langgässer describes the town in an idyllic way, so that the contrast with the hate implied by the sign is especially emphasized. Another conflict that unfolds through this literary technique is that the town should be open to "everyone", whereas "Jews" are now unwanted.

The message of the sign is even more problematic because the workers want to place it right next to a crucifix. Jesus is bound to the crucifix and above him is an inscription "I.N.R.I." that in English means, "Jesus of Nazareth, King of the Jews." It is notable that Christianity and its teaching of neighbourly love and charity no longer have a place in the town.

== The Motive of Antisemitism ==
The focus of this story lies in the reactions of the people to the sign and in their antisemitism. The sign should be a symbol of pride for the people, since it has been placed at the entrance of the town. On the sign is an antisemitic sentence; instead of saying something against it, the townspeople ignore it, and are unconcerned by it or are amused by it.

One can draw parallels from the life of Elisabeth Langgässer to this story; she was classified as half Jewish and her daughter was Jewish.

In "Saisonbeginn," Langgässer criticizes the double standard of the town residents, who by outward appearances are good Christians but at the same time discriminate against Jews.

== Literature ==
- P. Dormagen: Moderne Erzähler 2. Paderborn 1958.
- Axel Vieregg, in: Klassische deutsche Kurzgeschichten. Interpretationen. Hrsg. von Werner Bellmann. Reclam, Stuttgart 2004. S. 28-38.
