= Frank Thiess =

German writer (1890–1977)

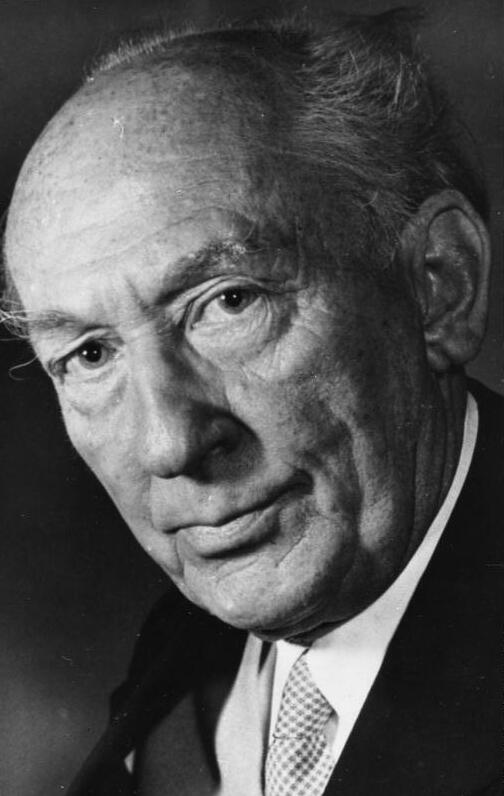
- Born: 1 March 1890 (in Julian calendar)
- Died: 22 December 1977; Darmstadt
- Education: Stephaneum
- Occupations: Screenwriter, writer, essayist, theatre critic, theatre director, dramaturge, editing staff
- Spouse: Yvonne Thiess

Frank Thiess (13 March 1890 – 22 December 1977) was a German writer.

== Biography ==
Born in Eluisenstein (now Ogre Municipality), Kreis Riga, Governorate of Livonia, Russian Empire (now Latvia), Thiess grew up in Berlin. He worked as a journalist before fighting in World War I. Discharged after a few months because of a heart condition, he returned to Berlin and journalism. Within a few years, however. he decided to devote himself full-time to writing. His early novels were focussed on contemporary subjects — Time magazine once called him "the hot trumpet in Germany's jazz age." He married Florence Losey, an American singer. From the 1930s on, he concentrated on historical novels.

His 1936 novel, Tsushima, translated into English as The Voyage of Forgotten Men, recounted the journey of the Russian Second Pacific Squadron, under the command of Admiral Rozhestvensky, from the Baltic Sea to the Sea of Japan, and its defeat by the Japanese fleet at the Battle of Tsushima in 1905.

His two-part novel, Neapolitanische Legende and Caruso in Sorrent, was based on the life and career of the great Italian tenor, Enrico Caruso.

Thiess remained in Nazi Germany during World War II.

Thiess died 1977 in Darmstadt.

== Bibliography ==
Novels:

- Claudia (1913)
- Der Tod von Falern (1921)
- Angelika ten Swaart (1923)
- Die Verdammten (English title: The Devil's Shadow; 1923)
- Das Gesicht des Jahrhunderts, Briefe an Zeitgenossen (1923)
- Der Leibheftige (English title: Design for Living; 1924)
- Frauenraub (English title: Interlude; 1927 - revised as Katharina Winter, 1949)
- Johanna und Esther (1933) (revised as Gäa (1957))
- Tsushima (English title: The Voyage of Forgotten Men; 1936)
- Das Reich der Dämonen (1941)
- Neapolitanische Legende (English title: Neapolitan Legend; 1942)
- Caruso in Sorrent (1946)
- Die Strassen des Labyrinths (1951)
- Die griechischen Kaiser (1959)
- Gäa (1959)
- Sturz nach oben (1961)
