= Inner emigration =

Alienation from one's country, government, and culture

Inner emigration (German: Innere Emigration, French: émigration intérieure) is a concept of an individual or social group who feels a sense of alienation from their country, its government, and its culture. This can be due to the inner emigrants' dissent from, or adherence to, a radical political or cultural change, or due to their belief in an ideology that they see as more important than loyalty to their nation or country.

The concept also applies to political dissidents who live under a police state, but who secretly violate the accompanying censorship of literature, music, and the arts. This concept is a regular theme in dystopian novels.

The similar term internal émigré was used in the Soviet Union as an insult towards Soviet dissidents, by suggesting that they had the same opinions as anti-communist refugees in the West.

In a private letter to the vocally rebellious fellow poet Titsian Tabidze, future Soviet dissident Boris Pasternak urged his friend to ignore the attacks against their poetry in the press: "Rely only on yourself. Dig more deeply with your drill without fear or favor, but inside yourself, inside yourself. If you do not find the people, the earth and the heaven there, then give up your search, for then there is nowhere else to search."

The most controversial use of this concept refers to Germans who agreed with the writers of Anti-Nazi Exilliteratur from the German diaspora, but who chose to continue living in Nazi Germany while outwardly appearing to conform.

The term inner emigration was most famously used by novelist Frank Thiess in response to Thomas Mann's BBC broadcast alleging German collective guilt for Nazi war crimes and The Holocaust. Thiess replied that Mann had spent the Nazi years in the relative freedom and safety of Switzerland and the United States and had not experienced the police state tactics used by the Nazi Party and the Gestapo. Mann therefore had no right, according to Thiess, to pass judgment upon the compromises made by those who had. Thiess further argued that many German people who had outwardly appeared to conform had proven far more heroic than political refugees like Mann, who now passed judgment on them after spending the Nazi years in other, freer countries.

== Origin of the concept ==
After the July Revolution and the abdication of King Charles X of France, Delphine de Girardin, wrote in 1839 about Legitimists within the French nobility during the July Monarchy of King Louis Philippe I:

Young people from the best circles of society, who bear the most famous names, display feverish activity heightened still further by their inner emigration and political aversions. They dance, they gallop, they waltz, the way they would fight if we had a war, the way they would love if people today still had poetry in their hearts. They do not attend the parties as court, ugh! There they would meet their lawyer or their banker; instead they prefer to go to the Musard, there they might at least meet their valet or their groom; wonderful! It is possible to dance in front of such people without compromising oneself.

Living in exile in the United States in the 1940s, the German writer Heinrich Mann, was concerned with the issue of German collective responsibility for World War II and the Holocaust. He wrote several essays on the subject, including "Deutsche Schuld und Unschuld" ("German Guilt and Innocence") and "Über Schuld und Erziehung" ("On Guilt and Education"). After reading about the liberation of the Nazi concentration camps in 1945, his younger brother, Thomas Mann said in a German-language BBC broadcast:

Our disgrace lies before the world, in front of the foreign commissions before whom these incredible pictures are presented and who report home about this surpassing of all hideousness that men can imagine. "Our disgrace" German readers and listeners! For everything German, everyone that speaks German, writes German, has lived in Germany, has been implicated by this dishonorable unmasking.

Frank Thiess argued that only those who had experienced life under the police state that was Nazi Germany had any right to speak for the German people about their guilt, and that, if anything, the "innere Emigranten" ('inner emigrants') had shown more moral courage than those who had observed events from a safe remove. In response, Mann declared that all literary works published under Hitler stank of "Blut und Schande" ('blood and shame') and should be destroyed. As a result of this controversy, German literature of the period is still judged and categorized based on the authors' moral status, rather than the political content or aesthetic value of their writings.

== Controversy ==
The moral issues surrounding inner emigration have long been a subject of debate. Some argue that political dissident writers who stayed behind in Germany criticized the regime in ways subtle enough to get through censorship in Nazi Germany. While others contend that such criticisms were "so subtle that they are invisible". The debate is further complicated by the varying degrees to which different writers were under threat, and the varying strength and nature of their protests. Some writers who later claimed to be inner emigrants appear to have done quite well for themselves during the war, while others, like Hermann Hesse, had all their writings banned by Nazi censorship, or were imprisoned.

Still others like Bishop Clemens von Galen, Sophie Scholl, and her fellow members of the White Rose, wrote openly of their real opinions of the genocidal Nazi police state and took the enormous risk of illegally mass producing and circulating those same writings, in an anti-Nazi equivalent to the Samizdat literature circulated by Soviet dissidents.

Yet other Germans, like Oskar Schindler and Wehrmacht Captain Wilm Hosenfeld, used the outward appearance of conformity as a shield for the rescue of Jews during the Holocaust.

At the 1998 Deutscher Historikertag Peter Schöttler, Götz Aly, and Michael Fahlbusch were involved in the debate concerning the role of German historians in Nazi Germany. The trio challenged the defense of Theodor Schieder, Werner Conze and Karl-Dietrich Erdmann in terms of inner emigration arguing that they were more complicit with the Nazi regime than had been recognised by the next generation of German historians, many of whom were their students.

== Other uses ==
The concept may apply more broadly to include others, such as visual artists, as well as writers. It can also apply to a situation more generally or metaphorically to mean a mental dissociation from one's country or surroundings. For example, Anglo-Irish people, whose loyalties still lie with the vanished British Empire rather than with the Irish Republic, have been identified as inner emigrants, and to residents of a commune linked to the counterculture of the 1960s.

On 31 October 1958, the Union of Soviet Writers held a trial behind closed doors as part of Nikita Khrushchev's ongoing campaign against Soviet dissident Boris Pasternak and his Nobel Prize-winning novel Doctor Zhivago. According to the meeting minutes, Pasternak was denounced as an internal émigré and as a Fascist fifth columnist. Afterwards, the attendees announced that Pasternak had been expelled from the Union. They further sent a signed petition to the Politburo, demanding that Pasternak be stripped of his Soviet citizenship and exiled to "his Capitalist paradise."

== See also ==
- German literature: Nazi Germany
- Irish republican legitimism
- Reichsbürger movement
- Shy Tory factor
- Sovereign citizen movement
- Spiral of silence
- Union of Slavic Forces of Russia
