= Wilhelm Lehmann =

German teacher and writer (1882–1968)

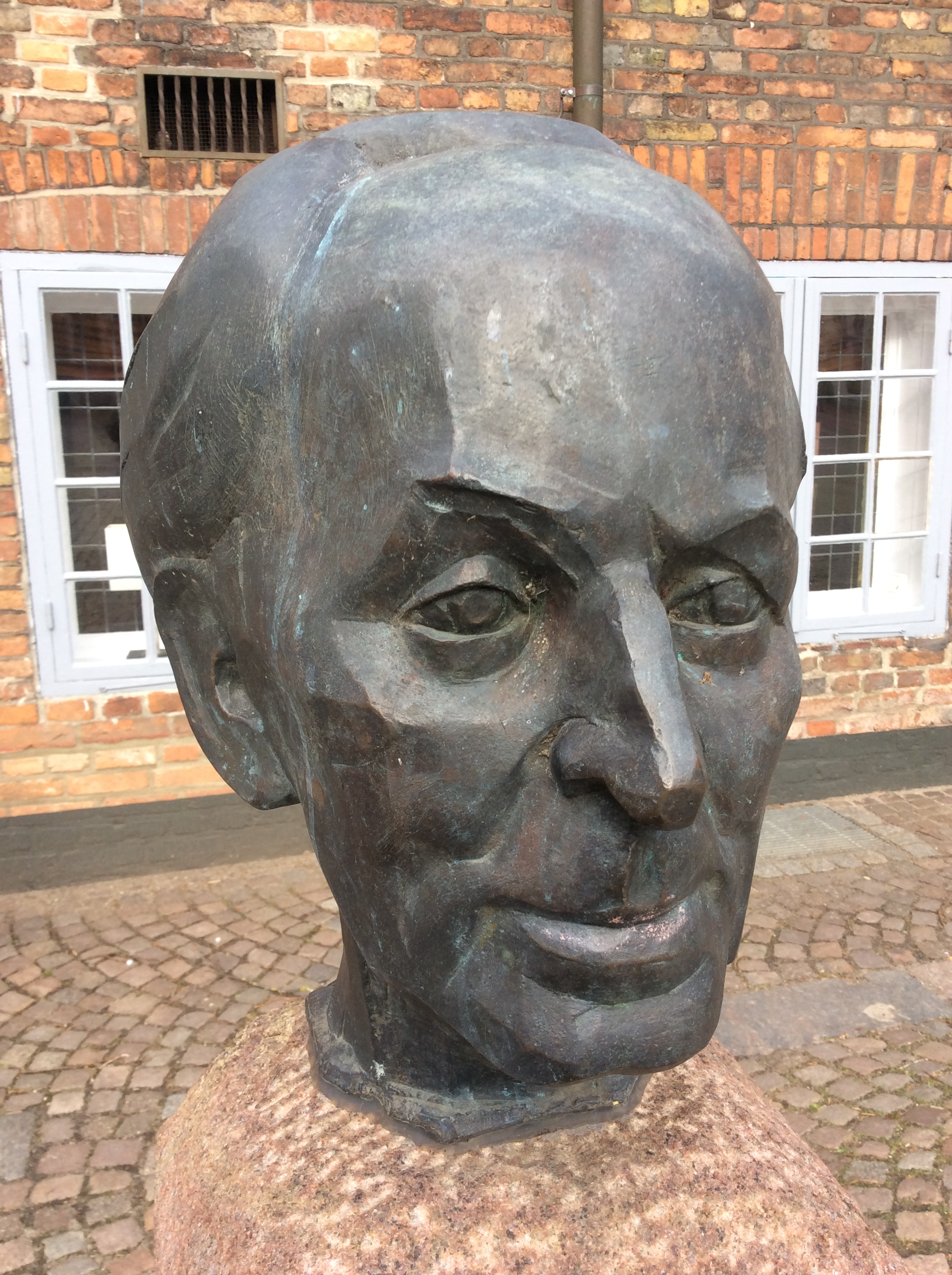
- Born: May 4, 1882
- Died: November 17, 1968 (aged 86)
- Occupation: Teacher, writer, artist

Wilhelm Lehmann was a German artist, teacher, and writer. Wilhelm Lehmann (Puerto Cabello 1882– Eckernförde 1968) was a German writer distinguished for his significant contributions to literature and poetry. His artistic work is celebrated for its autobiographical elements, lyrical intensity, and deep connection with nature.

Lehmann's literary career was marked by a unique blend of personal experiences and a profound understanding of the natural world, which is vividly reflected in his narrative and poetic works. His writing often explores themes of human struggle and the tranquility found in nature. This distinctive style is evident in his notable works, such as "Der Überläufer," a novel rooted in his harrowing experiences during World War I.

The lyrical quality of Lehmann's prose and poetry is characterized by a lack of pathos, despite its elevated nature. His linguistic, biological, and philosophical studies heavily influenced his poetics, infusing his work with a sense of natural magic and reverence for creation.

Throughout his career, Lehmann received numerous accolades that acknowledged his literary achievements. In 1923, he was awarded the prestigious Kleist Prize, a testament to his outstanding literary contributions. This was followed by the Art Prize of the State of Schleswig-Holstein in 1951, recognizing his impact on the regional cultural landscape. In 1957, his contributions to German literature and culture were further honored with the Grand Cross of Merit of the Federal Republic of Germany.

Lehmann's legacy extends beyond his lifetime through the Wilhelm-Lehmann-Society, founded to preserve and promote his work. The society actively engages in organizing events, publications, and the Wilhelm-Lehmann-Days in Eckernförde, highlighting his enduring influence in literary circles. Furthermore, the Wilhelm-Lehmann-Prize, awarded biennially by the society and the city of Eckernförde, continues to honor emerging writers, thus perpetuating Lehmann's artistic spirit in contemporary literature.
