= Wanda von Debschitz-Kunowski =

German portrait photographer

Wanda von Debschitz-Kunowski (née Wanda von Kunowski; 8 January 1870 – 23 April 1935) was a German portrait photographer based in Munich.

== Life ==
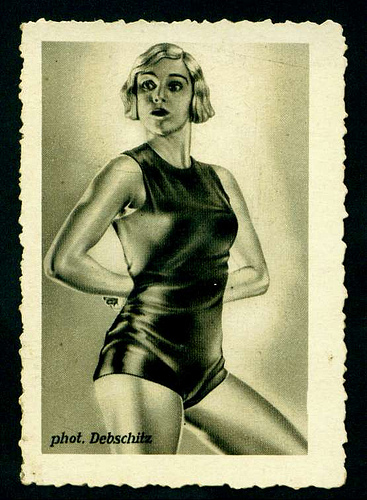
Trudi Schoop photographed by Debschitz-Kunowski

Kunowski was born in Hammer, Kreis Czarnikau, province of Posen, she was the daughter of August von Kunowski and Helene von Bethe. She was the first wife of Wilhelm von Debschitz; there were three children born of that marriage, including daughter Wanda Ziegert von Debschitz and Irene von Debschitz who would later marry Bauhausler Xanti Schawinsky. From 1902 through 1914, she worked at the Debschitz School, first in the metal workshop (1902-1905) and later teaching photography (1905-1914).

By 1921, she had opened her own photography studio in Berlin. Her work included nudes, and dancers. Debschitz-Kunowski's vision was known to have differed with that of the photographer Cami Stone, wife of Sasha Stone, in some of their collaborations.

Debschitz-Kunowski died in Berlin in 1935.

== Bibliography ==
- Baudin, Antoine (2005). Photography, Modern Architecture, and Design: The Alberto Sartoris Collection : Objects from the Vitra Design Museum. EPFL Press. ISBN 978-2-940222-07-0.
- Bertolotti, Alessandro (1 December 2007). Books of nudes. Abrams. ISBN 9780810994447.
- Toepfer, Karl Eric (1997). Empire of Ecstasy: Nudity and Movement in German Body Culture, 1910-1935. University of California Press. ISBN 978-0-520-91827-6.
