= Wilhelm von Debschitz =

German painter

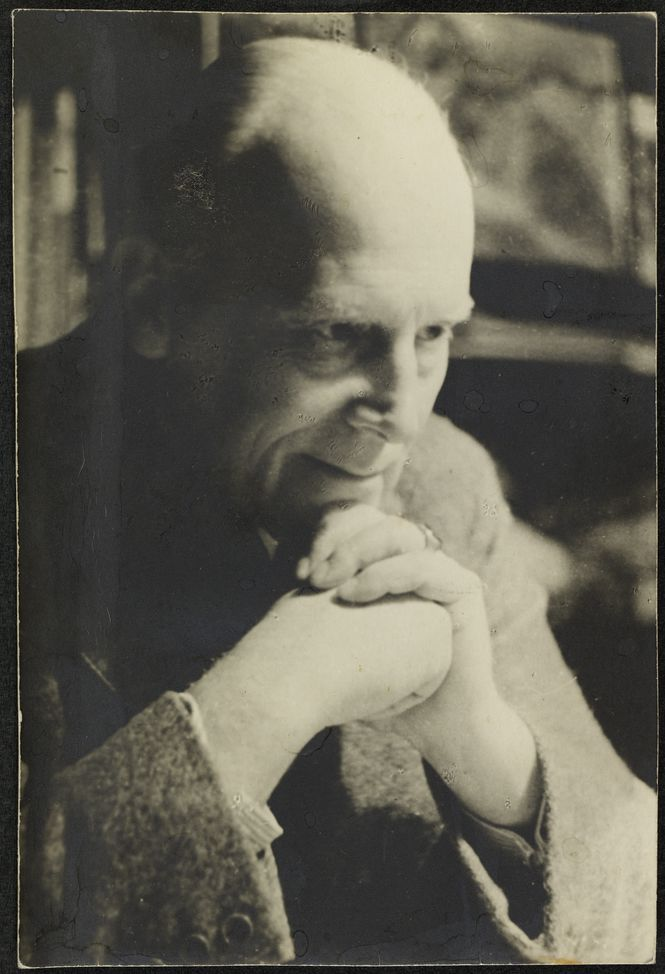
- Born: Wilhelm Siegfried Kurt von Debschitz; 21 February 1871; Görlitz, German Empire
- Died: 10 March 1948 (aged 77); Lüneburg, Allied-occupied Germany
- Known for: Painting, interior design, crafts, teaching
- Spouse(s): Wanda von Kunowski (1898–1924); Hedwig Naumann (1924–1948)

Wilhelm Siegfried Kurt von Debschitz (21 February 1871 – 10 March 1948) was a German painter, interior designer, craftsman, art teacher and founding director of an influential art school in Munich.

== Early life and education ==
He was born on 21 February 1871 in Görlitz, Germany to a family from the nobility of Upper Lusatia; his parents were the Prussian lieutenant general Kolmar von Debschitz (1809–1878) and Pauline von der Borne (1830–1912). He initially sought to follow in his father's footsteps by pursuing a military career as a Prussian officer cadet, but abandoned this and went to live in Munich from 1891. He elected instead to follow an artistic career, inspired by the drawings of Heinrich Knirr and an unknown painter, probably Heinrich Nauen. In 1898 he married Wanda von Kunowski, who was to become a prominent portrait photographer. They had three children between 1899–1903. He exhibited his works in 1899 at the Bayerischer Kunstgewerbe-Verein and in 1901 at Munich's inaugural Ausstellung für Kunst im Handwerk.

== Debschitz School (1902–1914) ==
In January 1902, Debschitz and his colleague, Swiss Jugendstil sculptor Hermann Obrist, co-founded the "Lehr- und Versuchsatelier für angewandte und freie Kunst" (Instructional and Trial Workshops for Applied and Fine Art), the so-called Debschitz School (Debschitz-Schule) which was active until 1914. Obrist focused on training sculptors, while Debschitz focused on the artists and management of the school. He took over the full management of the school following Obrist's departure in 1904, promoting artistic developments in a number of spheres, including commercial commissions, furniture design and metal, textile and ceramic works.

The school began with only six pupils but proved highly influential, training important artists such as Ernst Ludwig Kirchner, Avgusta Šantel and Sophie Taeuber-Arp. Paul Klee also worked there for a time as an assistant in the figure-drawing course.Also Paul Renner hired Maria Gundrum as a teacher in 1914. By 1910 the school had become the largest private institution of its kind in Germany. It was to provide a model for the later Bauhaus, whose founder Walter Gropius stayed in touch with Debschitz and visited the school on at least one occasion.

== Later in life and death ==
Poor health forced Debschitz to step away from managing the school in 1910–11 and 1913. He joined the Deutscher Werkbund, a German association of artists, architects, designers, and industrialists, in 1912. He handed over management of the school permanently in July 1914, leaving it in the hands of a consortium comprising Emil Preetorius, Paul Renner (a former pupil at the school) and Hans Cornelius. From 1914 to 1921 he worked as the director of Hanover's Kunstgewerbeschule- und Handwerkerschule. He was a co-founder of the Kestnergesellschaft there. In 1922 he moved to the Black Forest town of Bernau im Schwarzwald, where he focused on textile design and the chipboard industry. Two years later his marriage with von Kunowski broke up and they were divorced in July 1924; later that year he married Hedwig Naumann in Lüneburg, Lower Saxony.

Illness in the last few years of his life led him to live at Lüne Abbey in Lüneburg, where he died in 1948.
