= Lokuge =

Lokuge (Sinhala: ලොකුගේ, romanized: Lokugē) is a Sinhalese given name and a surname. Notable people with the name include:

== Given name ==
- Lokuge Chandradasa de Silva (1920–?), Ceylonese politician
- Lokuge Dinesh Chandimal (born 1989), Sri Lankan cricketer and former captain of the national cricket team

== Surname ==
- Chandani Lokuge (born 1952), Sri Lankan novelist and editor
- Gamini Lokuge (1943–2025), Sri Lankan politician, cabinet minister and MP (1983–2024)

== See also ==
- Cnemaspis lokugei, Lokuge's day gecko, a species of diurnal gecko endemic to Sri Lanka. Named in honour of Ajith Lokuge, ecologist
