= Sasha Stone =

Sasha Stone may refer to:

- Sasha Stone (blogger) (born 1965), American blogger, founder of Awards Daily blog
- Sasha Stone (photographer) (born 1895), Russian photographer

== See also ==
- Sacha Stone, British New Age influencer and conspiracy theory promoter
