= Ludwig Hirschfeld-Mack =

German-born Australian artist (1893–1965)

- Born: Ludwig Hirschfeld; 11 July 1893; Frankfurt-am-Main, German Empire
- Died: 7 January 1965 (aged 71); Allambie Heights, Sydney, Australia
- Education: Bauhaus, Weimar
- Occupations: Artist, musician, art educator
- Notable work: Desolation, Internment Camp, Hay 1941
- Spouse(s): Elenor Wirth (1917–1953); Olive Russell (1955–1965)

Ludwig Hirschfeld-Mack (11 July 1893 – 7 January 1965) was a German-born Australian artist.

His formative education was from 1912 until 1914 at the Debschitz-Schule, an art school in Munich founded by Wilhelm von Debschitz. Hirschfeld-Mack studied at the Bauhaus from 1919 until 1924 and remained working there until 1926 where, along with Kurt Schwerdtfeger, he further developed the Farblichtspiele (coloured-light-plays), which used a projection device to produce moving colours on a transparent screen accompanied by music composed by Hirschfeld-Mack. It is now regarded as an early form of multimedia. He was a participant, along with the former Bauhaus master Gertrud Grunow, in the II. Kongreß für Farbe-Ton-Forschung (Hamburg 1. – 5. Oktober 1930) (Second Congress for Colour-Sound Research). In 1923 he participated in the prestigious film festival Der Absolute Film in Berlin with other film producers such as Hans Richter, Viking Eggeling, Walter Ruttmann, Fernand Léger, Francis Picabia and René Clair. Music and colour theory remained lifelong interests, informing his art work in a number of media, and it was the inspiration for his well-respected and influential teaching.

== Life ==
Ludwig Hirschfeld-Mack was born on 11 July 1893, the first child of Johanna Clara Mack and leather-goods merchant Ernst Simon Hirschfeld (with a business at Flscherfeldstr. 9 Frankfurt am Main in 1930) and was the older brother of Marie Emilie, Gustave Heinrich and Lotte Josefine. Ludwig Johann Hirschfeld was educated in Frankfurt am Main where he grew up. He attended the Musterschule, a progressive Frankfurt high school for musically gifted children, which still exists today. He was later taught by Hermann Obrist and Wilhelm von Debschitz in Munich, taking art history with Heinrich Wölfflin and Fritz Burger. During the First World War, Hirschfeld-Mack was an infantry officer. The change of name from Hirschfeld to Hirschfeld-Mack is explained by his sister, Lotte Josefine Ackerrmin: "Ludvig added the name Mack to the name Hirschfeld as is often the case with artists. 'Mack' is the maiden name of our mother Clara ... the family Mack is of good Frankfurt stock". On 22 November he married Eleonore Wirth in Frankfurt am Main.

=== Bauhaus ===
Hirschfeld-Mack completed a craftsman apprenticeship at his father's leather factory before studying at the Teaching and Experimental Studios for Applied and Free Art (Debschitz School) under Hermann Obrist and Wilhelm von Debschitz in Munich in 1912. He then enrolled at the Ludwig-Maximilians-Universität München and attended lectures in art history by Heinrich Wölfflin and Fritz Burger. In 1919, he went to study at the Art Academy in Stuttgart under Adolf Hölzel (colour theory) and Ida Kerkovius, but later the same year enrolled at the Bauhaus, where he studied under Johannes Itten, Paul Klee and Wassily Kandinsky, and was apprenticed to Lyonel Feininger in the print workshop, obtaining a Bauhaus graduate diploma in lithography in 1924. When Itten did not offer a course devoted to colour at the Bauhaus, Hirschfeld-Mack offered to conduct a colour course during the winter semester of from 1922 to 1923. While this course was not officially recognised, it was at times attended by Kandisky and Klee.

He remained at the Weimar Bauhaus until its closure in 1925 and conducted experiments in light projection, following German sculptor Kurt Schwerdtfeger (1897–1966) in developing the "Farbenlichtspiele" (colour-light play), producing an apparatus that combined moving projections of coloured light through mechanically operable geometric stencils displayed to music created by Ludwig himself. Its first performance was at the Bauhaus Lantern Festival 21 June 1922. Ludwig described the kinetic projection as "fugue-like, strictly structured plays of colour, always derived from a definite colour-form theme".

In 1963, Hans Maria Wingler, the director of the newly established Bauhaus Archiv in Darmstadt, Germany, invited Ludwig to reconstruct his colour light plays, which required him to reconstruct the apparatus and rewrite the scores from his notes and his memory as well as prepare the music for the performance at the Bauhaus Archiv in Darmstadt. In early 1964, he and his second wife Olive departed for Europe and spent some time in Darmstadt training assistants for the performance. With the assistance of sponsors, a film of the black and white play Kreuzspiel was subsequently made by the trained assistants after his death and two copies of this film remain. In 2000 under the direction and assistance of Hirschfeld-Mack's grandson Kaj Delugan, performances of the plays were filmed in colour by Corinne Schweizer and Peter Böhm with a musical sound-track for the 2000 Exhibition in Bolzano, Italy.

=== Further teaching ===
In 1926, Hirschfeld-Mack began teaching art in the Wickersdorf Free School Community in Thuringia. In 1929, he was appointed as a teacher of colour and general morphology at the Weimar College of Architecture. The school was established in Weimar after the Bauhaus left in 1925, and reopened in Dessau in 1926. In 1930, the director Otto Bartning was replaced by Paul Schlze-Naumberg, an advocate of Nazi architecture, resulting in the dismissal of most of the staff. He then became professor at the Pedagogical Academy in Frankfurt (Oder) until its closure in 1932. He taught at the Teacher Training Academy in Kiel in northern Germany from 1932 until it too was closed by the Nazis in 1933. He moved in April 1933 to Berlin where he was able to obtain casual employment teaching the construction of musical instruments at the Jöde-Schule/Güntherschule and other institutes. Hirschfeld-Mack had married Elenor Wirth in 1917 and her father had established an acquaintance with the a member of the Clark family, who were members of the Quakers (Society of Friends) in England. After realising that his part Jewish Heritage made it impossible to obtain any permanent employment, Hirschfeld-Mack left Germany in early 1936 for Britain in search of permanent employment.

== United Kingdom ==
Upon arrival Hirschfeld-Mack spent some time in Haselmere in Surrey before moving to London, where he was eventually offered employment under the Quaker Subsistence Program, which aimed to teach unemployed miners in Wales new skills, where he was in charge of the carpentry workshop. It was part of the Brynmawr Experiment, an effort led by Peter Scott to address poverty and unemployment in Brynmawr, South Wales, between 1929 and 1939. Initially a relief project response of the Quakers in South-East England, it set up small industries and finally an ambitious utopian subsistence agriculture project for unemployed workers. After returning to Germany to finalise his papers and spending some time in a carpentry workshop, Hirschfeld-Mack returned to England to join the program in Cwmavon, Wales in the Eastern Valley of Monmouthshire in South Wales around May 1936. Hirschfeld-Mack's 1936 drawing of the brewery in which the workshops were held, and the surrounding valley, is held in the University of Melbourne art collection.

Elenor (died 1953) remained in Germany with the two youngest daughters, while his eldest, Marga, followed him into English exile. His second daughter Ursel (17) died by suicide in April 1938. The Museum of Modern Art, New York, included his work in its Bauhaus retrospective of 1938. His employer and address, when in October 1939 he was exempted from internment as an enemy alien, was Dulwich College, Coursehorn in Kent.

== Australia ==
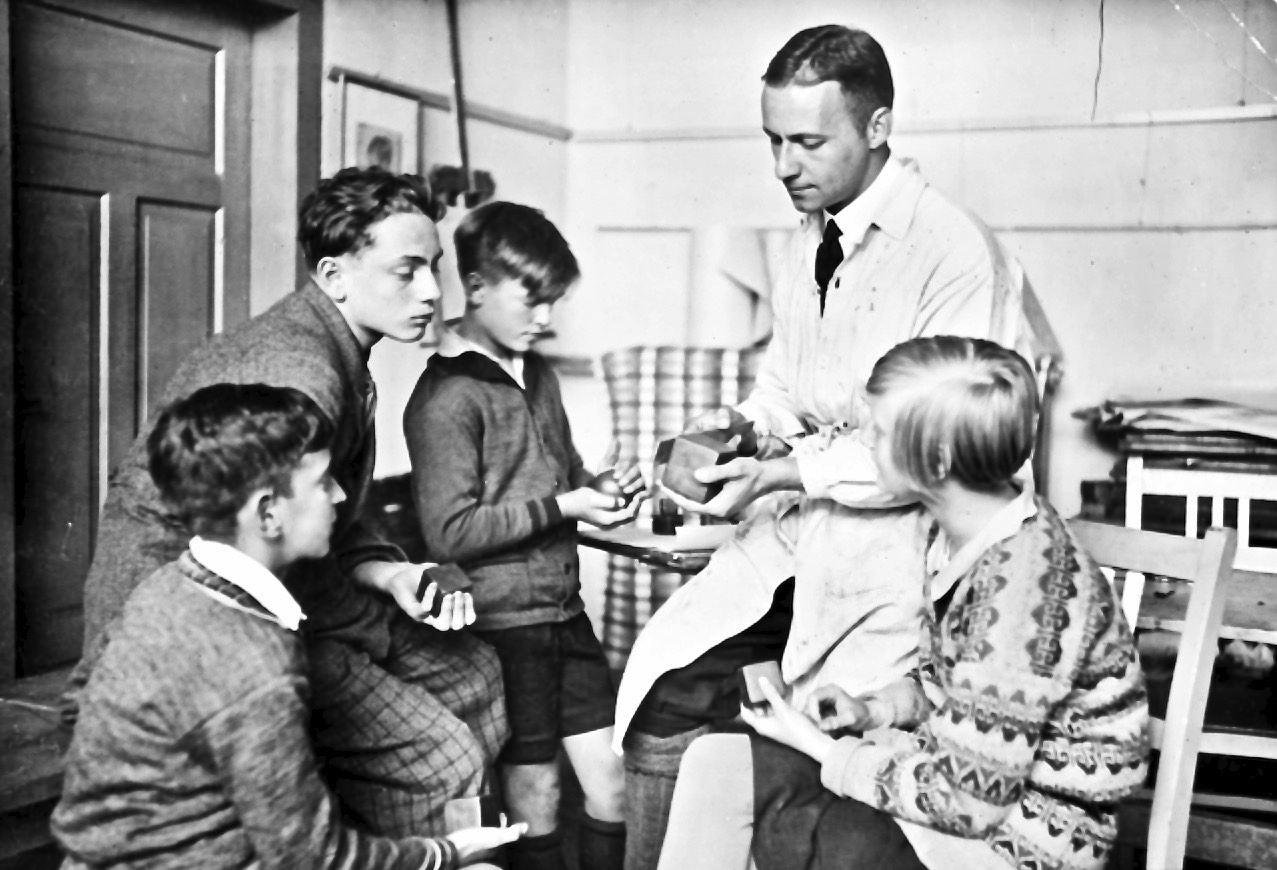
Hirschfeld-Mack with pupils at Geelong Grammar School

In 1940 however, Hirschfeld-Mack was deported to Australia as an enemy alien on the ship HMT Dunera, spending time in internment camps in Hay, Orange and Tatura, before being granted Australian citizenship. Imprisonment and the longing for freedom were the theme of his small, stark, poignant relief prints of this period, including the woodcut Desolation, Internment Camp, Hay 1941. As noted by Lucas Jordan in reviewing Dunera Lives:

The art of Ludwig Hirschfeld-Mack and Fritz Loewenstein contrasts the ways internees viewed a life of internment swallowed by the parched Australian bush. Hirschfeld-Mack’s woodcut dwarfs ‘Camp Orange’ in a vast landscape that offers a vision of ‘hope, not … despair’, whereas Loewenstein’s sketch, ‘Barbed wire, Orange,’ depicts the same landscape from behind barbed wire".

Hirschfeld-Mack was mentor to other internees including Erwin Fabian. His release from detention was secured in April 1942 through the intercession of James Ralph Darling, principal of Geelong Church of England Grammar School in Victoria, who appointed Hirschfeld-Mack as the art master, "Dr Hirschfeld", as he was known. One of his pupils, the curator Daniel Thomas, remembered his teacher in the Winter 1993 issue of Art and Australia:

The serene, quiet man - so fair that he glowed with the pale radiance of saints in stained glass windows - passed to and fro. One day I was looking at a book about Paul Klee. Hirschfeld noticed, and volunteered that he had known, and worked, with Klee, and with Kandinsky, whom I knew to be another modern master. I was electrified. Suddenly to see the stylistic connection between Klee’s art, illustrated in books, and Hirschfeld-Mack’s own framed watercolour hanging by the door to his flat was a first flash of art history, of the flow of forms and ideas through time and place.

Hirschfeld was held in high regard by students and staff alike, and proved to be an inspirational teacher, consistently propounding the Bauhaus principles of self-knowledge, economy of material and form, and reform of society through art. Hirschfeld-Mack taught the children musical harmony through the analogy of colour, introducing them to such things as colour-coded guitars and colour organs and in 1965 some of the instruments were donated to the Occupational Centre for Mental Handicapped Children in Geelong.

== Recognition ==
Hirschfeld-Mack was amongst a number of European wartime refugees who contributed to the renewal of Australian Art. As Joseph Burke, then Professor of Fine Arts at the University of Melbourne, notes in 1954: "Among the leaders of this 'New Australian' contribution may be mentioned Desiderius Orban (born 1884), a distinguished painter whose teaching has made a profound mark in Sydney in the post-war years; Ludwig Hirschfeld-Mack, an original member of the Bauhaus staff, a close colleague and friend of Paul Klee, whose work has influenced his own highly original abstract paintings; Sali Herman (born 1898), and the recent winner of the Blake Prize for Religious Art, Michael Kmit, from Ukraine.

Hirschfeld-Mack was also a guest lecturer at the University of Melbourne, where he had his first exhibition in Australia in the Rowden White Library in 1946, possibly organised by fellow Dunera passenger Franz Philipp, and in the same year his work was included in group exhibitions of the Contemporary Art Society (CAS) in Sydney and in Melbourne during its most radical period under John Reed. He showed also at the Peter Bray Gallery in Melbourne in 1953.

In 1949–1950, 1958 and 1964 he visited Europe. When Walter Gropius came to lecture at the Royal Australian Institute of Architects convention in Sydney in 1954 he made a special trip to Geelong Grammar School to visit his former colleague.

In 1955 Hirschfeld-Mack married Miss Olive Russell, a leading Quaker whom he had met at Tatura, and teacher of social studies at the Melbourne Church of England Girls Grammar School. In 1957 he retired from Geelong Grammar School and they moved to Ferny Creek, Victoria. He wrote on the Bauhaus in an article in Quadrant, with the rhetorical query "Is it an impossible fantasy that to-day in post-war Australia the opportunity exists for an analogous enterprise, by which a concentration of talent and idealism and strict study would be brought to bear on fundamental problems of design, using national and international resources?"

In 1960, Clement Meadmore selected works from Hirschfeld-Mack's own collection to curate the first significant exhibition of Bauhaus ideas and work in Australia, "The Bauhaus – Aspects and Influences", at Gallery A in Melbourne (July–August 1961). Included were Hirschfeld-Mack's own works and colour-coded musical instruments and proof prints he had made for other Bauhaus artists as well as numbers of works given to him during his period at the Bauhaus. In retirement in 1963 Hirschfeld-Mack published The Bauhaus: An Introductory Survey.

After Hirschfeld-Mack's death, Gallery A held a commemorative exhibition of his watercolours.

Ludwig Hirschfeld-Mack died on 7 January 1965 at Allambie Heights, a suburb of Sydney.

== Exhibitions ==
- 1938: Work represented in Bauhaus: 1919–1925 Museum of Modern Art, New York
- 1946: University of Melbourne
- 1953: Solo exhibition Peter Bray Gallery, 435 Bourke St., Melbourne, Victoria, Australia
- 1960, March: Gallery A, 60 Flinders Lane, Melbourne
- 1981: Memorial exhibition at University Gallery Melbourne
- 1988: The Great Australian Art Exhibition 1788–1988 Art Gallery of South Australia, 1988
- 2011-12: 6 August–4 March: The Mad Square: modernity in German art 1910–37, curated bn Jacqueline Strecker. Art Gallery of New South Wales (6 August–6 November 2011), National Gallery of Victoria (25 November 2011–4 March 2012)
- 2014, 5–25 September: Colour Music – A fusion of the senses. ANU Drill Hall Gallery, Kingsley Street, Acton
- 2019: Bauhaus Centenary: Ludwig Hirschfeld-Mack, 23 February 2019 – 26 May 2019, Geelong Gallery, 55 Little Malop Street, Geelong
- 2020–2021, December–18 April: Bauhaus Now: A legacy of migration and modernism. Museum of Brisbane

== Publications ==
He produced an explanatory text of the Farbenlichtspiele in 1923, also an article, "Reflected-Light Compositions..." (1925)

== The Ludwig Hirschfeld-Mack Collection ==
The Ludwig Hirschfeld-Mack Collection was presented to the University of Melbourne in 1971 and 1980 by Hirschfeld-Mack's widow, Olive Hirschfeld. The collection contains over six hundred works by Hirschfeld-Mack, including almost three hundred drawings, over two hundred prints, ninety-one watercolours and sixty-nine paintings. In addition, the University of Melbourne Archives houses material including correspondence, teaching aids, drawings, photographs and slides.

Olive Hirschfeld also donated a collection of her late husband's paintings, prints and drawings to the National Gallery of Australia, and a number of his works, many from his internment at nearby Tatura, can be found at the Geelong and Shepparton Regional Art Galleries.

== The Hirschfeld-Mack professorship in Germany and Australia ==
In 2008, the Institute of English Philology at the Free University of Berlin set up a Ludwig Hirschfeld-Mack Visiting Chair of Australian Studies. The professorship is named after Hirschfeld-Mack, "to stress the interdisciplinary nature of its teachers, their commitment to the role of culture in the public sphere, and the central transcultural German-Australian aspect of the project". The chair is funded by the German Academic Exchange Service (DAAD) and the Australian Embassy in Berlin.

Hirschfeld-Mack professors in Berlin included: Stephen Muecke, professor of cultural studies at the University of Technology Sydney; Philip Mead, professor of Australian literature at the University of Western Australia; Devleena Ghosh, associate professor in arts and sciences at the University of Technology Sydney; Lynn McCredden, professor of literary studies at Deakin University; Simon During, Australian professorial fellow at the University of Queensland; Anna Haebich, distinguished professor of human rights education at Curtin University; Peter Otto, professor of English and theatre at the University of Melbourne; Chandani Lokuge, associate professor in creative writing at Monash University; Verity Burgmann, professor of political science at the University of Melbourne; and Andrew Milner, professor of English and comparative literature at Monash University.

In 2010, DAAD established, in the reverse direction, a Hirschfeld-Mack Visiting Chair for German Studies at the German Department at the University of Western Australia. Through this reciprocal visiting professor program the exchange between the Australian and German higher education system is intensified. The first Hirschfeld-Mack professors in Perth were the Germanists Matthias N. Lorenz, Bielefeld University (2010), and Sven Kramer, Leuphana University of Lüneburg (2011).
