= Friedrich Cornelius =

German historian

- Born: 2 July 1893; Munich, Germany
- Died: 8 January 1976 (aged 82); Schondorf, Germany

Academic background
- Education: Ludwig-Maximilians-Universität München

Academic work
- Discipline: Ancient history
- Institutions: Ludwig-Maximilians-Universität München
- Main interests: Ancient Near East; Classical antiquity; Germanic Antiquity

Friedrich Cornelius (2 July 1893 – 8 January 1976) was a German historian who specialized in ancient history.

== Biography ==
Friedrich Cornelius was born in Munich, Germany, on 2 July 1893. He was the son of Hans Cornelius, grandson of Carl Adolph Cornelius, great-nephew of Peter Cornelius and great-great-nephew of Peter von Cornelius. He gained his Abitur at the Wilhelmsgymnasium in Munich in 1912, and subsequently studied history at the Ludwig-Maximilians-Universität München (LMU). He was in the German Army during World War I, and gained his Ph.D. in history at LMU in 1919.

After obtaining his Ph.D., Cornelius worked as a freelance writer for many years. He joined the Nazi Party in July 1930 and subsequently became Ortsgruppenleiter and Mayor of Garching bei München. He completed his habilitation on Roman history at the University of Würzburg in 1939 under the supervision of Alexander Schenk Graf von Stauffenberg. During World War II, Cornelius worked at the Institute for Research on the Jewish Question. During this time, Cornelius wrote a work on Erich Ludendorff and, with Walter Eckhardt, a multi-volume series on the early history of the Germanic peoples. Both works were banned in the Soviet occupation zone in the aftermath of the war.

After 1957, Cornelius lectured on the ancient history of the Near East at the Ludwig-Maximilians-Universität München. Following the retirement of Hermann Bengtson at Munich, he lectured on religion in classical antiquity. Cornelius was well-known for having used cuneiform tablets to correctly estimate the years in which Hammurabi reigned. He was the author of a number of works which covered a diverse set of topics, including the histories of Ancient Greece, Ancient Rome, the Germanic peoples and the Hittites, and Germanic and Indo-European religion. Cornelius died in Schondorf am Ammersee, Germany, on 8 January 1976.

== Selected works ==
- 1925: Die Weltgeschichte und ihr Rhythmus. Ernst Reinhardt Verlag München
- 1929: Die Tyrannis in Athen. Ernst Reinhardt Verlag München
- 1932: Cannae: Das militärische und das literarische Problem (= Klio. Beihefte. volume 26). Dieterich, Leipzig
- Schäffers Abriß aus Kultur und Geschichte. Verlag W. Kohlhammer Abteilung Schäffer Leipzig:

- 1938: Abriß der Germanischen Götterlehre. Heft 10
- 1942: Abriß der Germanischen Geschichte.

- 1940: Untersuchungen zur frühen römischen Geschichte. Ernst Reinhardt Verlag München
- 1942: Indogermanische Religionsgeschichte. Ernst Reinhardt Verlag München
- Schäffers Abriß aus Kultur und Geschichte, Abteilung I Geschichte; W. Kohlhammer Verlag Stuttgart und Köln:

- 1950: Geschichte des Alten Orients, volume 3.
- 1950: Griechische Geschichte. volume 4.
- 1950: Römische Geschichte. volume 5.
- 1950: Das Zeitalter des Absolutismus. volume 9.

- 1959: Wilhelm Esch-Expedition nach Kleinasien
- 1960: Geistesgeschichte der Frühzeit. I. Teil. Verlag E. J. Brill, Leiden
- 1962: Geistesgeschichte der Frühzeit. II. Teil volume 1
- 1967: Geistesgeschichte der Frühzeit. II. Teil volume 2
- 1969: Mitarbeiter bei der deutschen Ausgabe des zweibändigen enzyklopädischen Werkes: Die Bibel und ihre WELT. Herausgegeben von Gaalyahu Cornfeld und Johannes Botterweck, Gustav Lübbe Verlag.
- 1969: Die Glaubwürdigkeit der Evangelien (Philologische Untersuchungen) Ernst Reinhardt Verlag München/Basel
- 1973: Geschichte der Hethiter. Wissenschaftliche Buchgesellschaft. Darmstadt

== See also ==
- Franz Altheim

== Sources ==
- Kurzbiografie bei: Werner Schubert, Werner Schmid, Jürgen Regge: Akademie für deutsches Recht, 1933–1945: Protokolle der Ausschüsse, volume 3, Familienrechtsausschuss, volume 3, S. 40.
