= Maria Gundrum =

Swiss teacher, painter, and art historian (1868 – 1941)

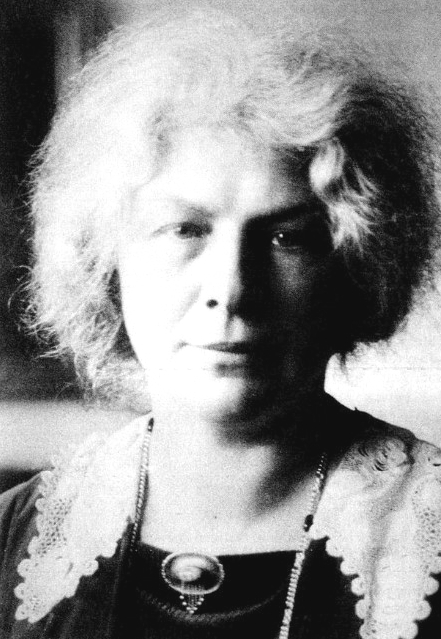
- Born: 18 July 1868; Munich, Germany
- Died: 27 March 1941 (aged 72); Schwabing
- Occupations: Art historian, painter

Maria Gundrum (18 July 1868 in Munich – 27 March 1941 in Schwabing) was a Swiss teacher, painter, art historian, and art mediator.

== Life ==
Maria Gundrum’s grandfather, Johann Michael Gundrum, was from Speyer and became a citizen of Basel in 1842. Her father, Johann Friedrich Wilhelm Gundrum, a stonemason, was born in Basel, while her mother, Maria Schlottenhöfer, was from Munich. After their marriage, her father moved to Munich, where he died three years later. Gundrum came to Basel at the age of eleven through relatives to live with her grandparents. She later spent the rest of her education in an orphanage.

In 1884, she was admitted to the New Girls’ School Teacher Training College in Bern, headed by Melchior Schöpley from Thurgau. After three years of training, Gundrum graduated with a diploma as a primary school teacher and passed the Basel Girls’ School examination, which qualified her to teach in grades five to eight. Maria Gundrum grew up at a time when girls were deprived of a classical humanist education. As a young teacher, she was frustrated by the arguments of school authorities that, as a woman, she lacked the skills of her male colleagues.

After brief stays in France and England, Gundrum returned to Basel and studied drawing and painting for two semesters at the Basel School of Applied Arts. In 1892, she took over the teaching duties of a retired teacher at a girls’ secondary school and was hired as a permanent teacher a year later.

== Work ==
After the Swiss Association of Women Teachers was founded in Bern in December 1893, Gundrum supported the establishment of a branch in Basel in 1895. She was elected president of the association. In 1896, she traveled to Geneva to attend a congress “for the interests of women.” Among other things, participants called for the admission of women to teaching positions at all levels of education, equal rights, and participation of women on school boards. At the annual general meeting of the association in Basel, Gundrum presented the accepted demands to the association, which at that time had 76 members. In 1897, Gundrum resigned from the presidency due to lack of official support. Rosa Preisorke succeeded her. However, Gundrum remained active on the board of the Teachers’ Association. She was a founding member and editor of the Swiss Teachers’ Journal and continued to advocate for social and educational reform.

In the spring of 1897, Gundrum went on a cultural-historical art tour of Italy with Hannah Schwarz. That same year, she began studying art history under Heinrich Wölfflin at the University of Basel. By her fifth semester, she was considered one of Wölfflin’s most promising students, and he invited her to his home. Other women in his circle included Marie Lutz, Adele Stocklin (1876–1960), and Amy Elisabeth Kötgen (1868–1948).

== Teaching and Painting ==
In 1900, Gundrum lived in Munich for a year, where she met Carl Schwarzschild and others, and corresponded with him until 1903. After returning to Basel, she resumed her teaching position at a girls’ secondary school. She also taught painting at a private school and organized study visits to Basel museums for her students.

When she was no longer able to continue teaching at the secondary school, she resigned in the spring of 1902 to establish herself as a freelance art historian, writer, and art guide. During this period, she remained active in Basel and continued teaching at a private institution. In addition, between 1901 and 1903, she offered courses for art enthusiasts in the public art collection of the Kunstmuseum Basel on Augustinergasse.

In May 1903, on the advice of Paul Ganz, she traveled to Rome for further training and established a studio at the Villa Strohl Fern near Ponte Milvio. After returning to Basel, she did not complete the formal academic qualification she had hoped for, despite continued engagement with her studies and mentors. In 1906, Gundrum travelled to Britain, where she painted landscapes. She was a member of the Basel artists’ circle and exhibited eight works at the Kunsthalle Basel in 1907 in the “Special Exhibition of Young Artists of Basel.” Further exhibitions followed in 1909, 1919, 1920, and 1921.

From 1907 onwards, Gundrum became part of the intellectual circle around Ludwig Klages and Alfred Schuler. Their cultural and philosophical ideas, focused on mythology, cultural criticism, and the search for historical “roots,” influenced her intellectual development and strengthened her position as an independent thinker. Within this context, she acted as a liaison between members of the circle and participated in their discussions and networks. After Klages moved to Switzerland in 1915, Gundrum maintained contact with him and continued to serve as an intermediary between him and Schuler for several years. Through her connections, Christoph Bernoulli was also introduced to the circle. From 1908 to 1910, she lived again in Munich, where she met Hans Cornelius. She remained in contact with members of this intellectual network throughout her later life.

Paul Renner hired Gundrum as a teacher at the Debschitz School, where she taught liberal arts. In 1914, Gundrum’s mother died in Munich, after which she returned. Discussing art, which had come more easily to her in her youth than producing artwork, allowed her to share her knowledge as a freelance art historian and tour guide with art-loving groups in Germany and Italy.

== Gundrum Circle ==
In 1920, Gundrum bought a house in Hödingen. There she met various artists, including Carl Caspar and Maria Caspar-Filser, Paul Renner, Hans Cornelius and his family, Carl Krill, Fritz Spanagel, and Bertil Malmberg. Eva Bernoulli met Gundrum in Munich around 1922/23. During Wölfflin’s visiting semester in 1926/27, students met him in Gundrum’s apartment in Munich. The core of the “Gundrum Circle” consisted of Swiss art history students.

== Later years ==
According to Stadt.Geschichte.Basel and Dorothea Roth, Gundrum later came into contact with individuals and circles in Munich associated with National Socialist and antisemitic ideas. In 1935, the Swiss Teachers’ Association ended its cooperation with her. She had previously given lectures, organized art history study tours, and written for the Teachers’ Magazine. Through the mediation of Irene Reichert, Gundrum was able to teach at the Elizabeth Duncan School in 1937. She also established contact with Elsa Bruckmann, who supported her with books and materials for her lectures and cultural work.

== Death ==
In the summer of 1940, Gundrum traveled to Switzerland for the last time and met Wölfflin in Zürich. In February 1941, she fell ill and later suffered a stroke in hospital, dying at the age of 72. At Gundrum’s request, Ulrich Christoffel delivered an art history lecture on the night of her funeral. Her estate included paintings, books, and photographs bequeathed to friends and colleagues.
