= Hermann Obrist =

Swiss sculptor (1863–1927)

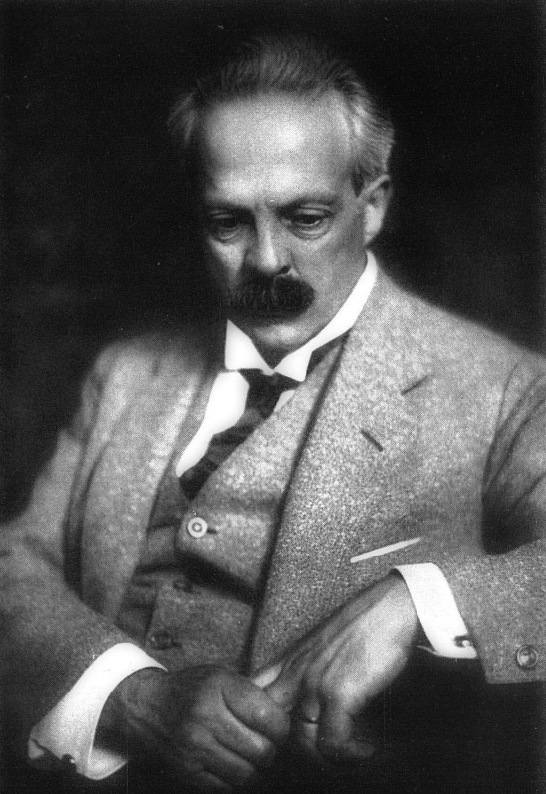

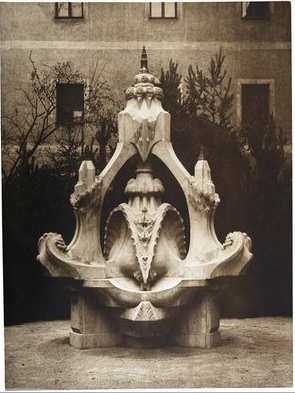
Krupp fountain (1912) by Obrist in Munich, Germany.

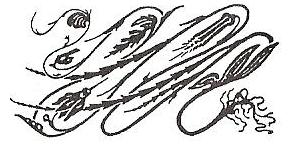
A simplified version of Cyclamen

Hermann Obrist (23 May 1862 at Kilchberg (near Zürich), Switzerland – 26 February 1927, Munich, Germany) was a Swiss sculptor of the Jugendstil and Art Nouveau movement. He studied Botany and History in his youth; the influence of those subjects is detected in his later work in the field of applied arts. As a teacher, Hermann Obrist exerted a seminal influence on the rise and subsequent development of Jugendstil in Germany.

== Biography ==
Hermann Obrist was the son of Doctor Carl Kaspar Obrist, of Zurich, and Alice Jane Grant Duff, sister of the British politician and statesman Mountstuart Grant Duff. He studied natural sciences and medicine in Heidelberg, and made several trips during which he had visions that determined his artistic vocation. After deciding in 1887 to follow this path, he enrolled at the School of Applied Arts in Karlsruhe to study art techniques.

He received an award for his ceramics and furniture at the Paris Exposition of 1889. In 1890, he entered the sculpture class at the Académie Julian in Paris. The following year, he moved to Berlin where he earned his living mainly as a journalist for the cultural pages. In 1892, the sale of a fountain model gave him the means to move to Florence where he opened with Berthe Ruchet, an embroidery workshop, which he moved to Munich in 1895. Its ornamental embroideries and sculptures experienced growing success in Germany.

In 1902 Obrist and Wilhelm von Debschitz co-founded a design school in Munich, Debschitz School (1902–1914). Students of his included Ludwig Hirschfeld Mack, who also studied at the Bauhaus. He then engaged in an intense activity as author and speaker and spoke of relations with other artists such as Wassily Kandinsky. Obrist left the Debschitz School in 1904.

Obrist commissioned his friend August Endell to design his studio in Munich, built in 1897 and destroyed in 1944, during World War II. Obrist's works included fountains and funerary monuments. He often used concrete for his works.

In addition to being a sculptor he was also a textile artist. Obrist's most famous and influential work was the design for an 1892 embroidered wall hanging called "Cyclamen". It featured a series of elegant, looping curves of cyclamen flowers, described as whiplash curves, or Peitschenhieb in German, and became a seminal work of the Art Nouveau movement.

== Literature ==
- Hermann Obrist. Sculptur/Space/Abstraction around 1900, exhib. cat. Museum für Gestaltung Zürich / Staatliche Graphische Sammlung München / Henry Moore Institute Leeds, ed. by Eva Afuhs and Andreas Strobl, Zürich: Scheidegger & Spiess 2009. ISBN 9783858812391
