= Cami Stone =

Belgian photographer (1892–1976)

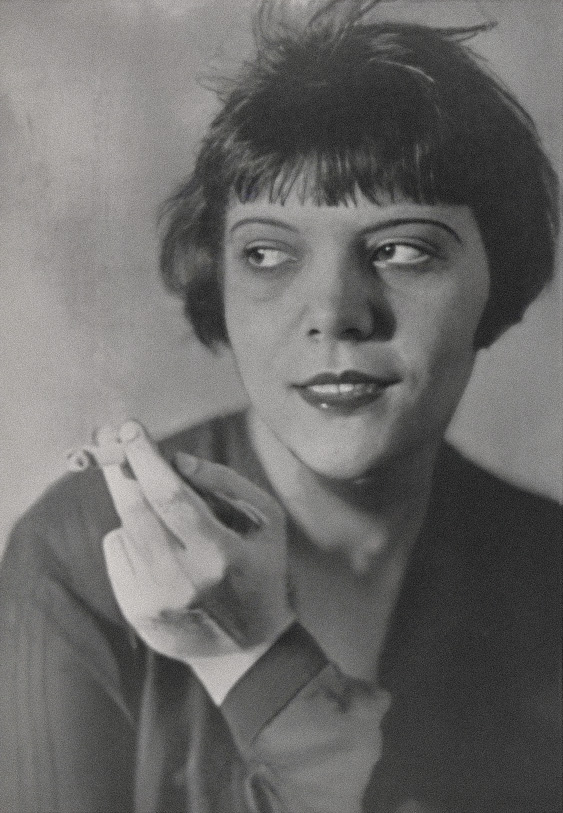
- Portrait of Cami Stone by Sasha Stone, 1929
- Born: Camille Honorine Schammelhout; 1892; Vilvoorde, Belgium
- Died: 1975 (aged 82–83); Amsterdam, Netherlands
- Known for: Photography
- Spouse: Sasha Stone (photographer)

Cami Stone (born Wilhelmine Camille Honorine Schammelhout; June 27, 1892 – March 3, 1975) was a Belgian photographer. She had a certain notoriety in the Berlin of the 1920s, then in Brussels. She was invited to participate in the famous Film und Foto exhibition in Stuttgart in 1929. After her work was rediscovered, her photographs were put up for sale in major auction houses.

== Biography ==
Camille Honorine Schammelhout was born in Vilvoorde, Belgium, in 1892. She died in 1975 in Amsterdam (Netherlands) , at the age of 83. During the First World War, she lived in La Haye and London, where her boyfriend, Sasha Stone, a member of the US army met in New York , was stationed . In 1918, she ran an import-export business in New York.

In Paris, she was introduced to photography by Stone. She married him in Berlin in 1922, where they settled in 1918 In 1928, Cami and Sasha opened the Atelier Stone, which produced architectural and advertising photographs. Stone is one of the most important photographers of the Weimar Republic. She portrayed many personalities of the time such as Albert Einstein, Anna Sten, Lou Albert-Lasard, and Erwin Piscator. She was invited to the historic Film und Foto exhibition in 1929 in Stuttgart where her works were massively exhibited. This places her photographs in the modernist movement of the Neues Sehen (new vision). As Nazism progressed in Germany, the Atelier Stone was transferred to Brussels in 1931 (Sasha Stone parents were Jews from Russia). She took industrial photographs and portraits of artists for the opera house La Monnaie. She also practiced film set photography for Henri Storck and Joris Ivens.

Stone practiced studio photography in Brussels. She composed nudes that can be found in the portfolio "25 NUES FEMMES DE SASHA STONE" printed in 100 numbered copies; and containing 25 original silver gelatin prints each. These nude studies are part of the straight photography movement. Some Cami Stone prints are signed "Cami Stone", others "Stone" or even "S. Stone" (her husband's initials). All of these prints have the copyright stamp of Cami Stone on the back. The most frequently presented nude study from this portfolio is "Plate 13" by Cami Stone. Sasha and Cami divorced in 1939.

Over 800 photos by the Atelier Stone that were mostly made in Berlin between 1925 and 1930 reappeared in the early 2000s. Protected by Cami Stone's family during the Second World War, the photographs found are unique: the glass plate negatives no longer exist, as Cami Stone had to sell them after the war to recover the silver salts.
