= Chandani Lokuge =

Chandani Lokuge or Lokugé (born 1952) is a Sri Lankan-born novelist, academic and literary critic now living in Australia.

== Early life and education ==
Lokuge was born in Colombo, Sri Lanka in 1952. She was educated at St Bridget's Convent,Colombo, before completing a BA at the University of Kelaniya and MA at the University of Peradeniya. Awarded a Commonwealth Scholarship, she moved to Australia in 1987 to undertake a PhD at Flinders University, Adelaide, graduating in 1993.

== Career ==
During her PhD studies, Lokuge began writing short stories which were published in The CRNLE Reviews Journal. In 1992 she published her first book, a collection of short stories.

Lokuge worked as a tutor and lecturer at Flinders University then moved to Melbourne in 2001 to join Monash University, initially as a lecturer, rising to Director of the Centre for Postcolonial Writing. During that time she spent time as the Ludwig Hirschfeld-Mack Visiting Chair in Australian Studies at the Free University of Berlin.

== Works ==
=== Novels and short stories ===
- Lokugé, Chandani (1992). Moth and other stories. Sydney: Dangaroo Press. ISBN 978-1-871049-13-8.
- —— (2000). If the moon smiled. New Delhi : New York, NY: Penguin Books ; Penguin Putnam Inc. ISBN 978-0-14-028472-0.
- —— (2003). Turtle nest. Camberwell, Vic: Penguin Books. ISBN 978-0-14-029916-8.
- —— (2011). Softly, as I leave you. North Melbourne, Vic: Arcadia. ISBN 978-1-921875-41-0.
- —— (2019). My Van Gogh. North Melbourne, Vic: Arcadia. ISBN 978-1-925984-17-0.

=== Edited publications ===
- Lokugé, Chandani; Probyn, Clive, eds. (2003). "Home and Away" issue, New Literatures Review, No. 40, Winter 2003.
- Wilson, Janet; Lokugé, Chandani, eds. (2018). Mediating literary borders: Asian Australian writing. London: Routledge. ISBN 978-1-138-57081-8.
