= Sasha Stone (photographer) =

20th-century photographer

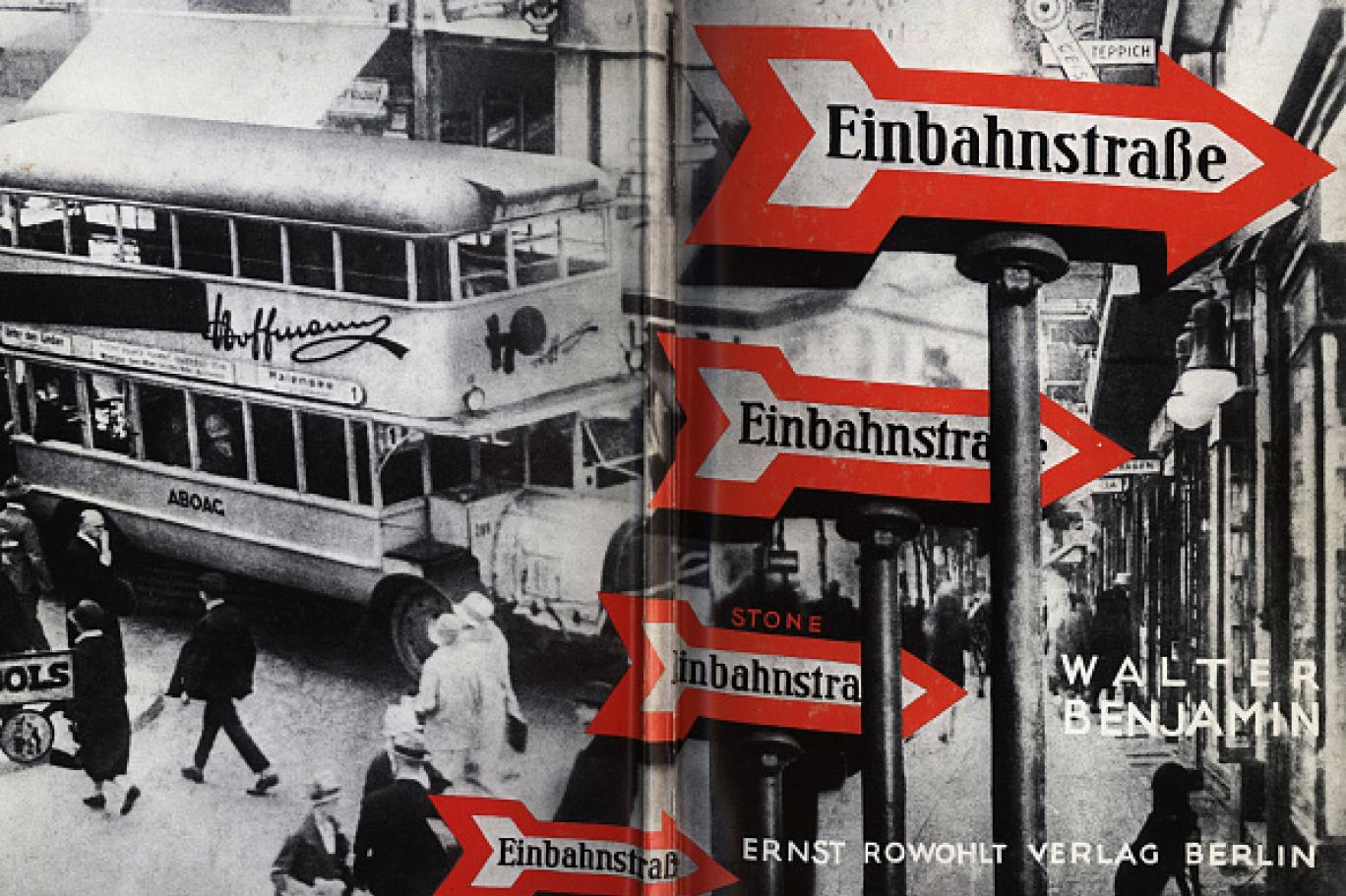
Stone's photomontage for the cover of Walter Benjamin's Einbahnstraße. Stone has signed his work in red, above the second-smallest one-way street sign.

Sasha Stone (December 16, 1895 – August 6, 1940), born Aleksander Serge Steinsapir, was a Russian-born artist. A stateless photographer, he and his first wife, Cami Stone (born Wilhelmine Schammelhout 1892-1975), were successful photographers during the 1920s and 1930s. One of his best-known works is the photomontage he designed for the cover of Walter Benjamin's Einbahnstraße (One-Way Street) published in 1928.

== Biography ==
Sasha was born as Aleksander Steinsapir to Jewish parents, Natan Steinsapir and Bella Meerson, in Saint Petersburg, Russia. He studied electrical engineering at Warsaw Technical Institute in Poland from 1911 to 1913. In 1913, he immigrated to New York and spent a few years working briefly at the Edison Company in New Jersey. In 1917, Sasha enlisted in the United States Army, served in WWI and was honorably discharged on June 14, 1919. While in the United States Army he was granted a stay at the American Expeditionary Forces (AEF) Art Training Centre in Paris after the war.

After his military discharge, Sasha lived in the Rue de Plantes, Paris, and worked as a sculptor. In 1918, Sasha and Cami moved to Berlin together and later married in 1922. When he moved to Berlin, he kept his studio in Rue de Plantes for his cousin Harry Ossip Meerson to use; however, Meerson failed to pay rent and was evicted. In Berlin, Sasha was associated with the sculptor Aleksandr Archipenko, and was a contributor to the magazine G – Material zur elementaren Gestaltung. His work was published in Die Form, Das Kunstblatt, UHU, Berliner Illustrirte Zeitung, Der Querschnitt, Gebrauchsgraphik, and Die Dame as well. In 1924, Sasha and Cami opened their own studio in Berlin, named Atelier Stone, meaning "Studio Stone".

In 1928, he officially changed his name to Sasha Stone and became a painter. He had little success as an artist. Due to an economic downturn in Europe during this period, Sasha focused on photography as a main source of income. Sasha had become an extremely versatile photographer, working with portraits, journalism, feature images, advertising, property, fashion, and architecture photos. His photos appeared in Adolf Behne's edition of Berlin in Bildern, and Paul Cohen-Portheim's travel guide Paris. Sasha took images for surrealist journals like Varietés in Belgium and Bilfur in Paris. His work was presented in the first international photography exhibition called Fotografie der Gegenwart in Essen, Germany, and Werkbund's exhibition Film und Foto in Stuttgart, Germany.

In 1931, Sasha and Cami moved to Brussels, Cami's hometown, where they lived until they divorced. In 1933, the couple were part of the Exposition Internationale de la Photographie in Brussels. A collection of nudes by Sasha and Cami Stone was published in Les Femmes through the French magazine Arts et Métiers graphiques in 1933. Throughout this time Sasha was connected with artists, celebrities and intellectuals of that period.

Sasha and Cami divorced on February 15, 1939. They continued to work together until Sasha remarried. On April 29, 1939, Sasha Stone remarried, to Lydia Edens (born Alida Anna Edens). Sasha, Lydia and other families fled the German attack on Brussels on May 14, 1940. Their goal was to reach Spain and then go to the United States for safety. The group was en route through the Pyrénées in Perpignan, France. On August 6, 1940, Sasha died in Perpignan due to a serious ailment. The exact location of his grave is unknown. The only thing left is the graveyard book entry.

== Publications ==
- Sasha Stone, Berlin in Bildern, 1925–39
- Sasha and Cami Stone, Femme, 1930

== Works ==
- Berlin in Bildern. Berlin: Gebr. Mann, 1998. Print.
- Sasha Stone, Fotografien 1925-1939. Berlin: Nishen, 1990. Print.
- Sasha Stone sieht noch mehr: Ein Fotograf zwischen Kunst und Kommerz. N.p.: Michael Imhof Verlag, n.d. Print.

== Photo gallery ==
Nudes from Sasha Stone's book Femmes, Paris: Arts & Métiers graphiques, 1933.

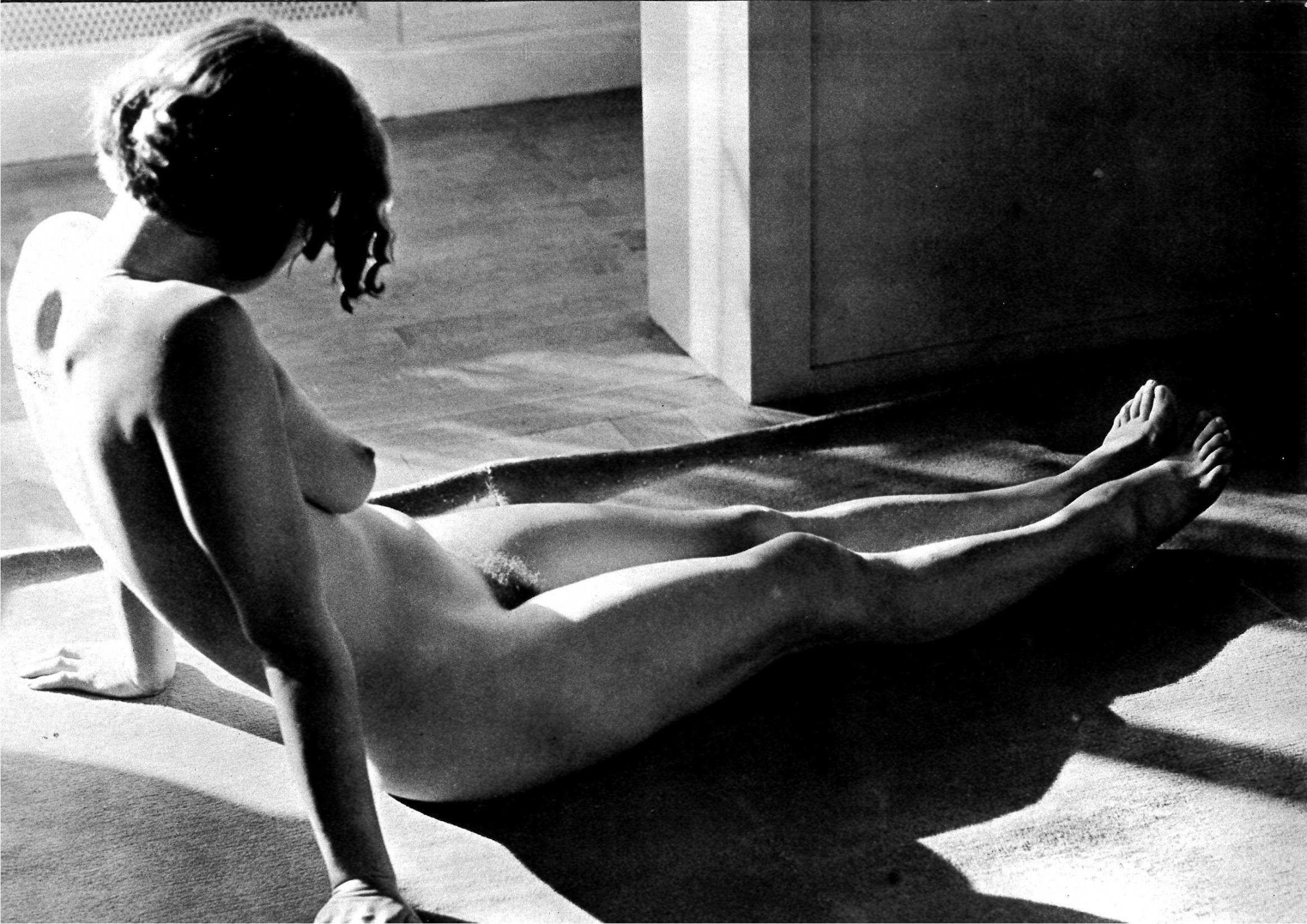

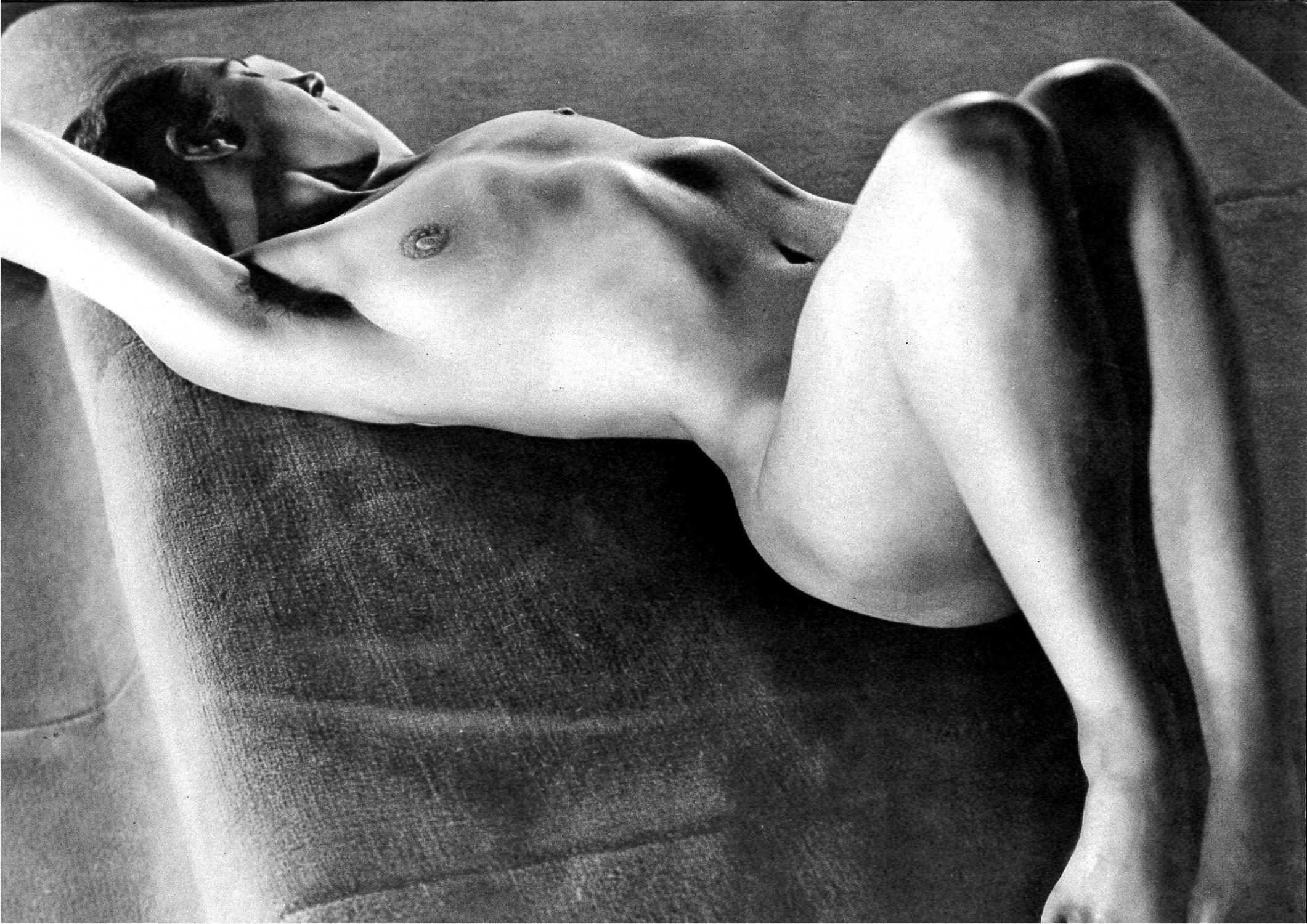

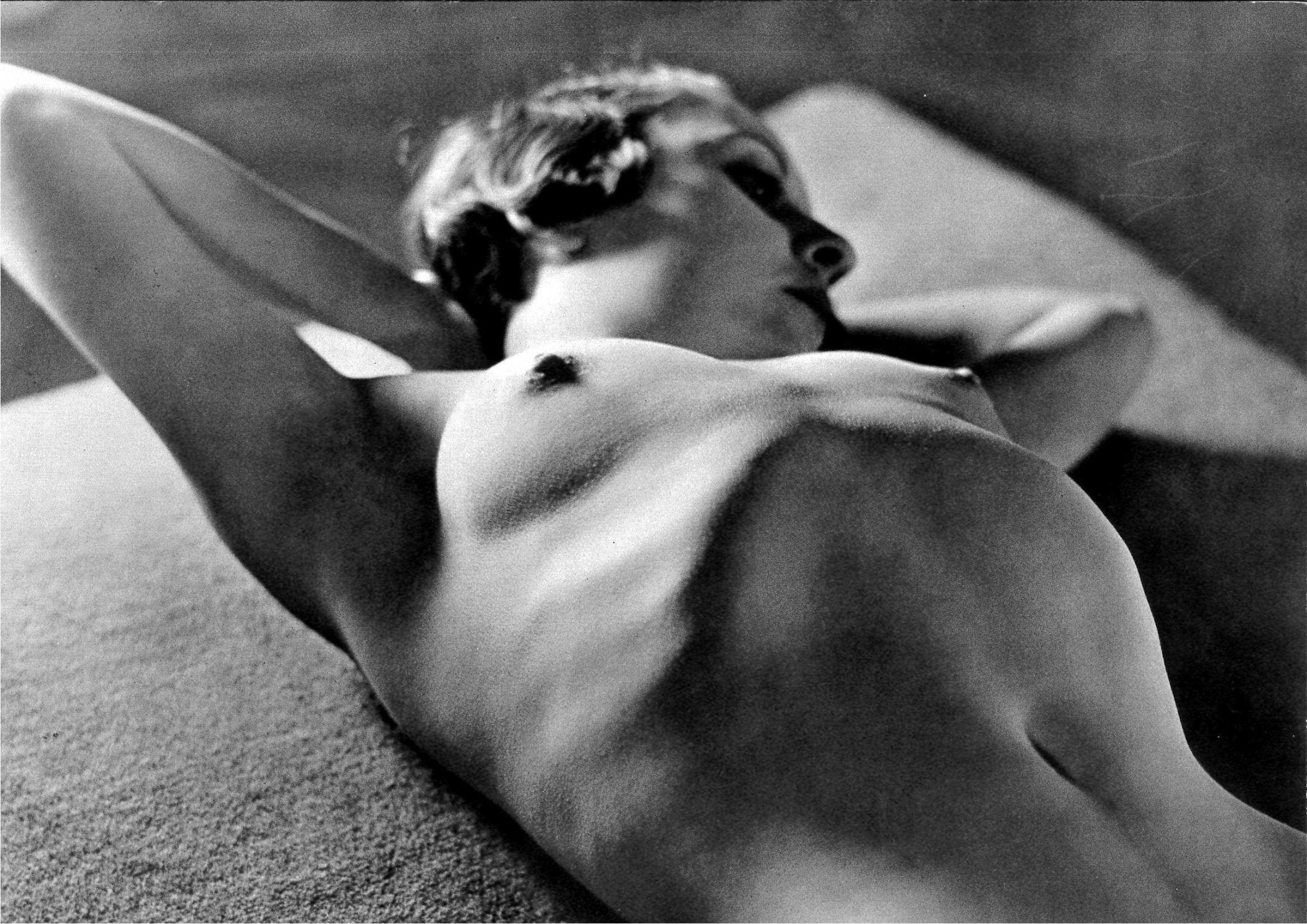

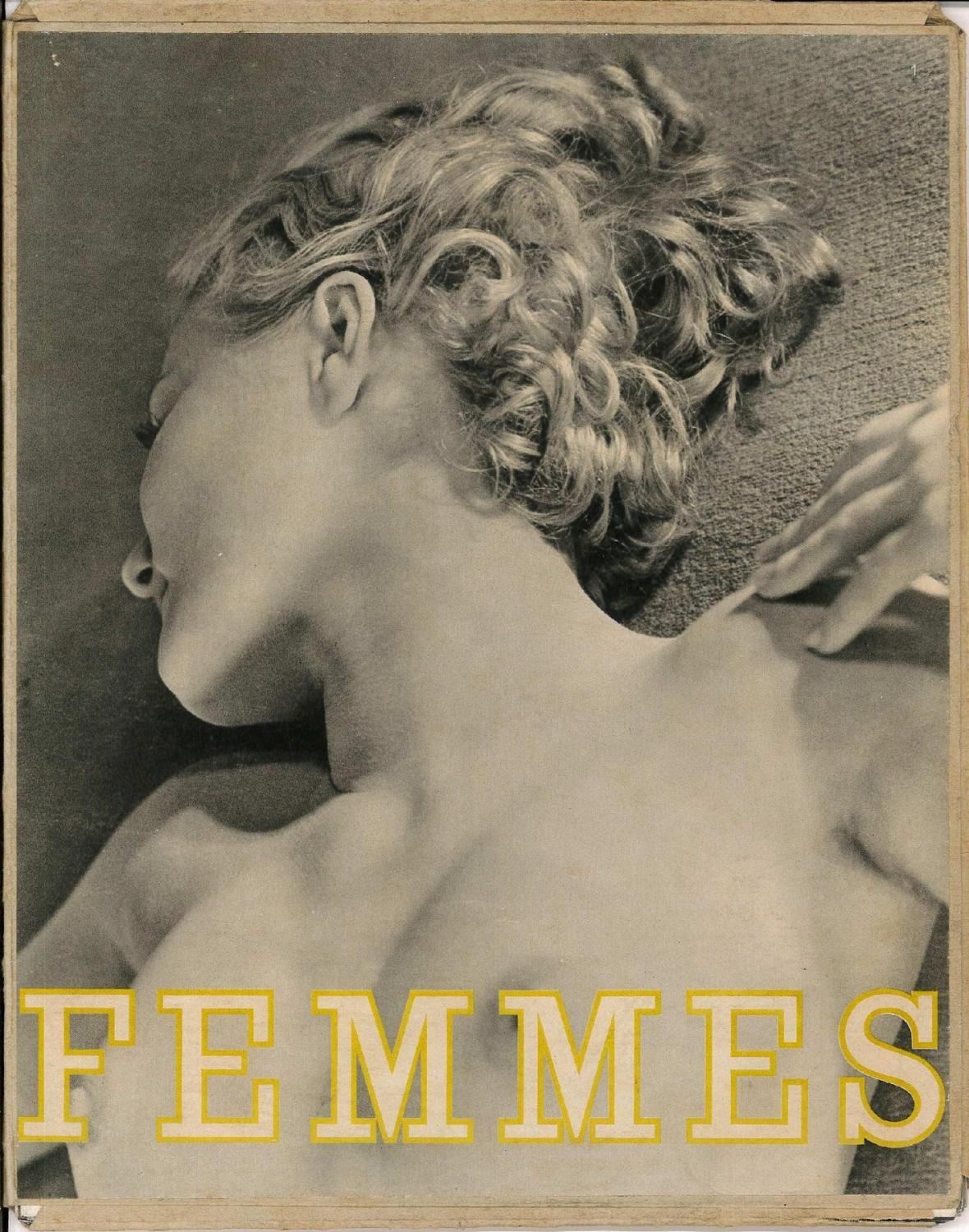
cover

== Sources ==
- Hammers, Birgit. “Sasha Stone” RWTH AACHEN University. (accessed October 29, 2015)
- Paenhuysen, An. “Berlin in Pictures: Weimar City and the Loss of Landscape.” New German Critique 109, Vol. 37, No.1 (Winter 2010): 1-25. (accessed October 29, 2015).
