= Hans Cornelius =

German philosopher (1863–1947)

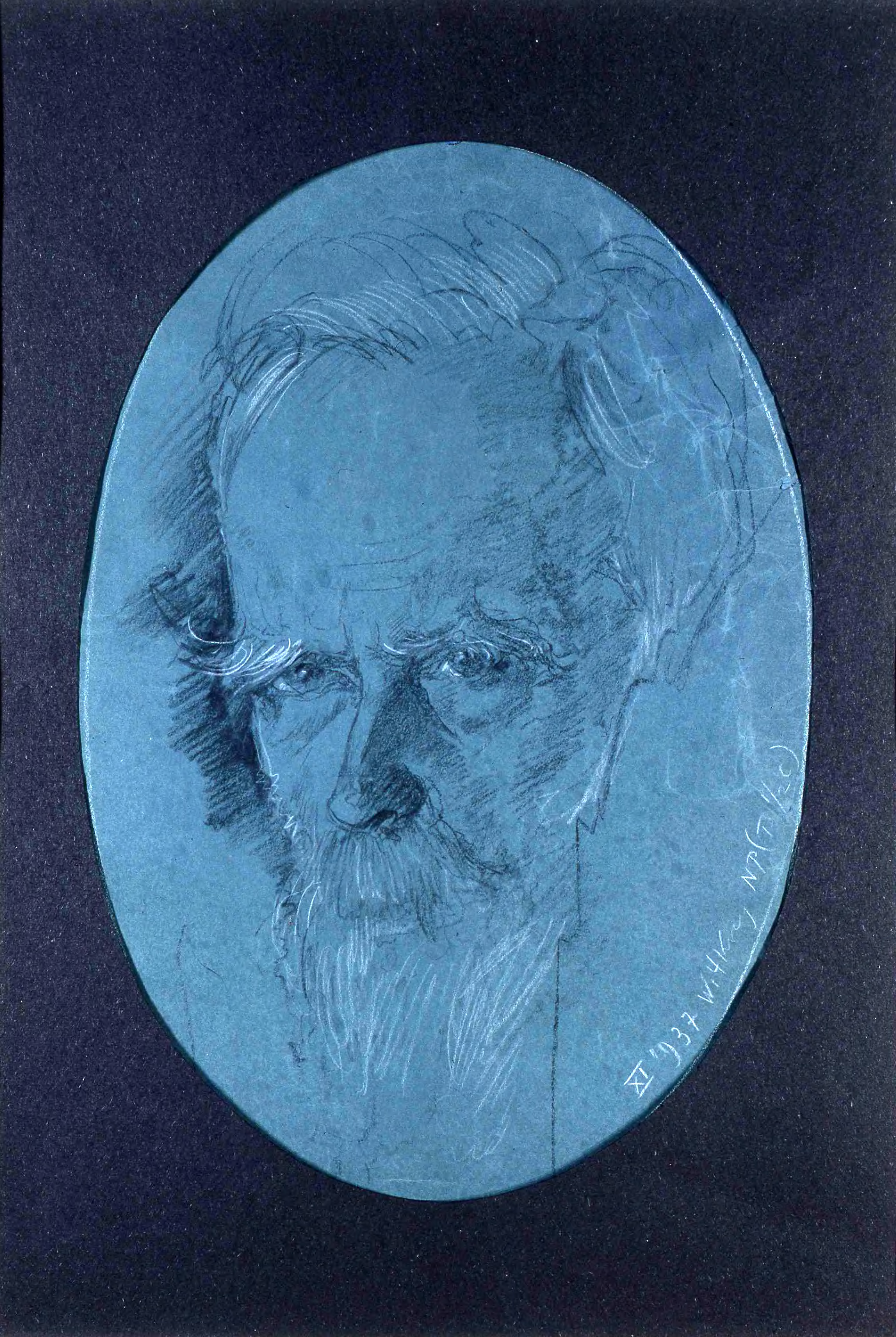
Portrait of Hans Cornelius by Stanisław Ignacy Witkiewicz

Johannes Wilhelm Cornelius (German: [kɔʁˈneːli̯ʊs]; 27 September 1863, Munich – 23 August 1947, Gräfelfing) was a German neo-Kantian philosopher and psychologist.

== Biography ==
Born in Munich, Kingdom of Bavaria on 27 September 1863, he originally studied mathematics, physics, and chemistry, graduating with a Ph.D. in 1886, before turning to philosophy. In 1894, he habilitated in philosophy and subsequently held a post in philosophy at the Ludwig-Maximilians-Universität München (until 1903 as a Privatdozent). In 1910, Cornelius moved as a full professor to the Akademie für Sozialwissenschaften, which four years later would become a department of the newly founded University of Frankfurt am Main. Among his doctoral students in Frankfurt were Max Horkheimer and Theodor Adorno.

His work was influenced by psychologist Max Wertheimer.

Cornelius, who was a consistent opponent of World War I, joined the Social Democratic Party of Germany (SPD) in 1918 and in the 1920s, he promoted the plan of a European confederation. He supported the idea of a League of Nations in his paper Völkerbund und Dauerfriede (1919).

Hans Cornelius married Emilie (Mia) von Dessauer (1862–1946), a daughter of Heinrich von Dessauer (1830–1879), a physician and founder of the German hospital in Valparaíso, in 1887; Ingeborg Karlson (1894–1924), from Liljeholmen near Stockholm, in 1915, in his second marriage; and Friedrike Rosenthal, widowed Reissner (1886–1939), in 1925, in his third marriage. In 1941, he entered into a fourth marriage with Hedwig Krämer, widowed Drechsel (born 1896). Four children came from the first marriage: the later geologist Hans Peter Cornelius (1888–1950), Wolfgang (born 1890), Friedrich (1893–1976) and Evi (born 1894). The second marriage resulted in two sons, Yngor [Yngve] (born 1921) and Hans Wolfgang Amadeus (1923–2013).

Cornelius retired in 1928. He died in 1947 in Gräfelfing, Bavaria.
