= PAGB =

PAGB can mean:

- Galbraith Lake Airport
- Photographic Alliance of Great Britain
- Proprietary Association of Great Britain, the UK trade association for manufacturers of over-the-counter medicines and food supplements
