= Malcolm Arbuthnot =

English painter

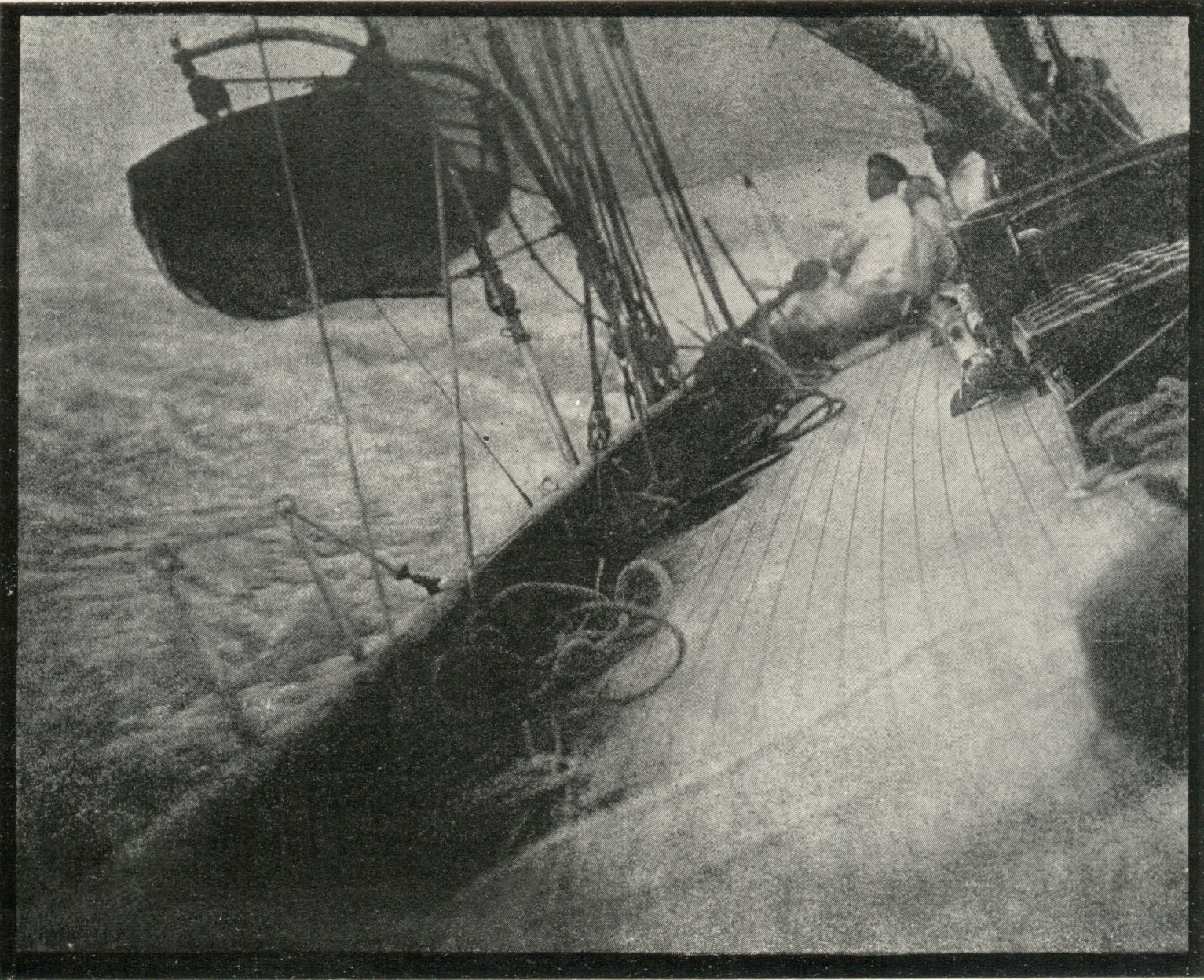
Malcolm Arbuthnot: Old photograph, taken from the bridge of a sailing ship, heeling considerably, dated 1908

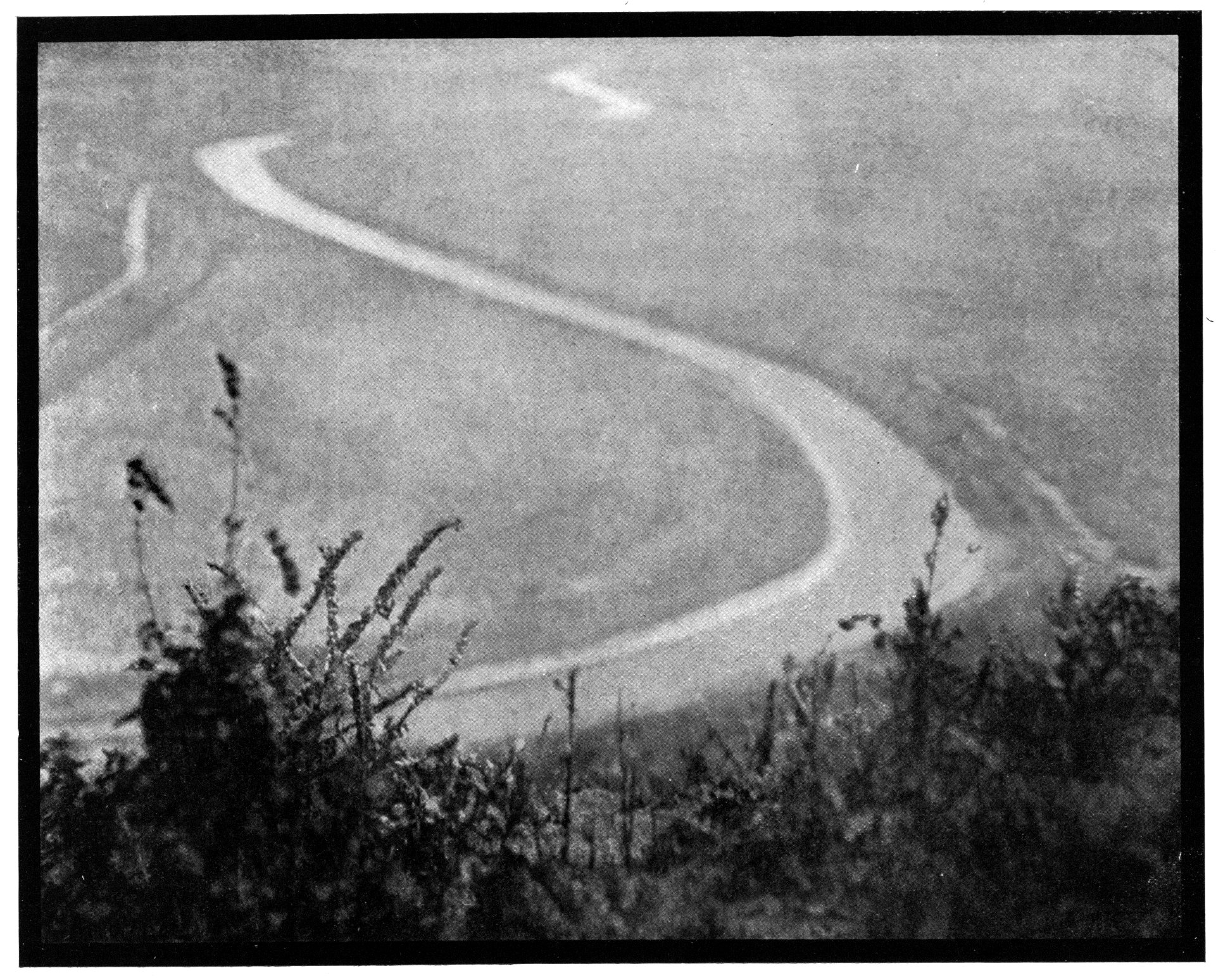
Malcolm Arbuthnot: Photograph of a landscape with the meander of a river, in a pictorialist style, dated 1908

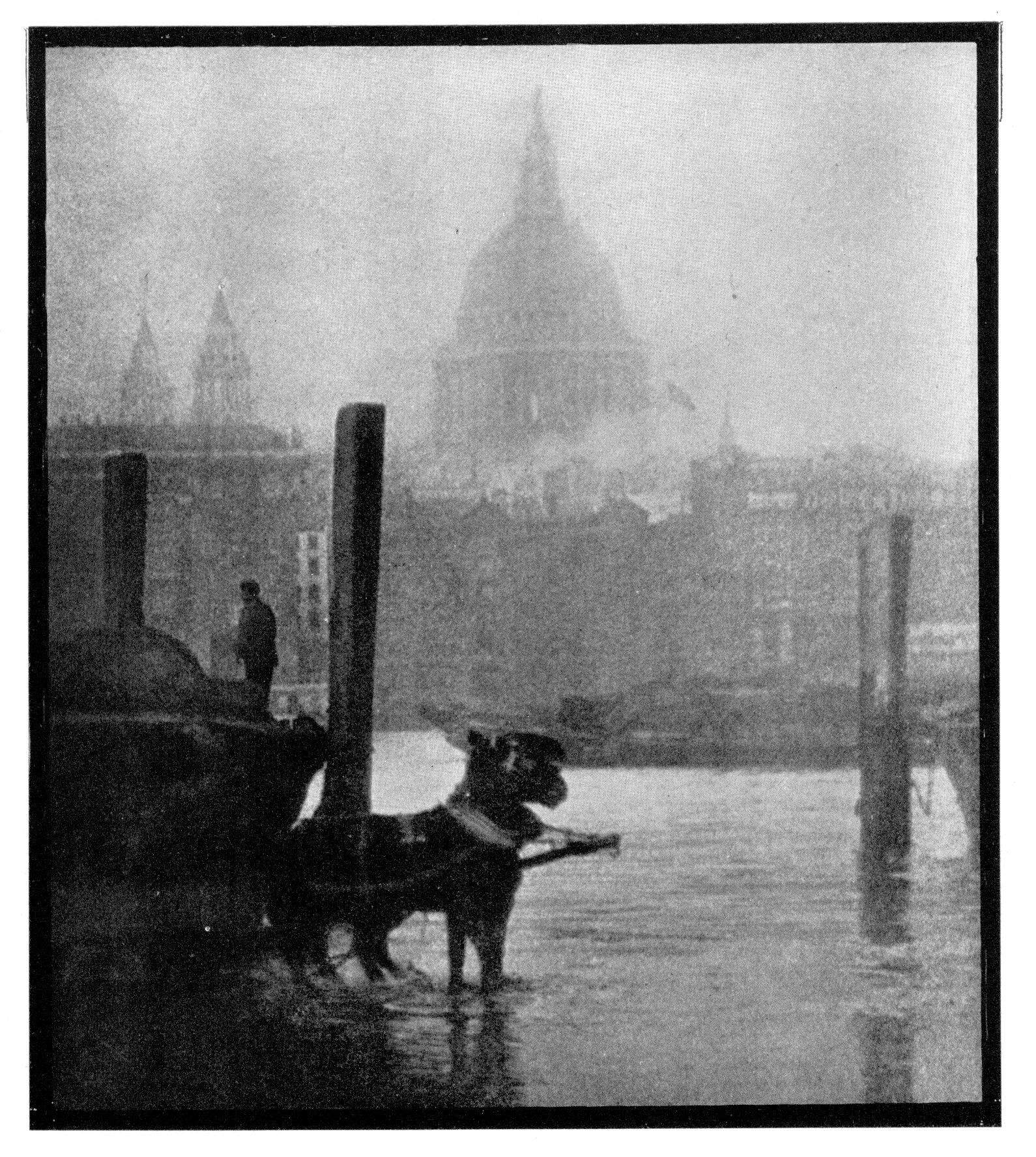
Malcolm Arbuthnot: View of a barge in the Thames, London with St Paul's Cathedral in the background, dated 1908

Malcolm Arbuthnot (born Malcolm Lewin Stockdale Parsons, 1877, Cobham, Surrey – died 27 March 1967) was a pictorialist photographer and artist. In his teenage years he was a keen cyclist, who participated in renowned endurance events like the Bath Road Cycling Club's 100 miles race.

In 1907, he joined the Brotherhood of the Linked Ring, an organisation founded in 1892 by Alfred Maskell and others dissatisfied with the ethos of the Royal Photographic Society exhibitions, with the aim to promote naturalistic and aesthetic photography as an independent art.

From 1914, Arbuthnot ran a portrait studio in London's New Bond Street, in the early 20th century photographing many celebrities including the actress Lillah McCarthy, the pianist Harriet Cohen and the poet Robert Nichols. His studio, along with many of his works, was destroyed in a fire. He was a friend of George Bernard Shaw.

Also in 1914, he was one of the signatories - the only photographer - to the manifesto of the Vorticism movement published in the first issue of the literary magazine BLAST.

He combined his interests in photography and art by using gum and oil pigment processes, after joining the Linked Ring making increasingly controversial anti-naturalistic gum prints.

After World War I, he gave up photography in favour of painting, working in oils, watercolours and gouaches.

He married twice, and had numerous adopted children. His first marriage to Florence Emily Goold ("Daisy") ended in divorce following her adultery with the poet John Gould Fletcher, whom she later married. (The settlement from Fletcher for her upkeep was instrumental in Arbuthnot financing the launch of his London studio). His second wife Florence Annie Davison was the widow of George Davison, a millionaire through investments in Kodak, and her inherited wealth enabled the couple to retire to Jersey in 1931.
