= Impressionist photography =

Photographic style inspired by Impressionism

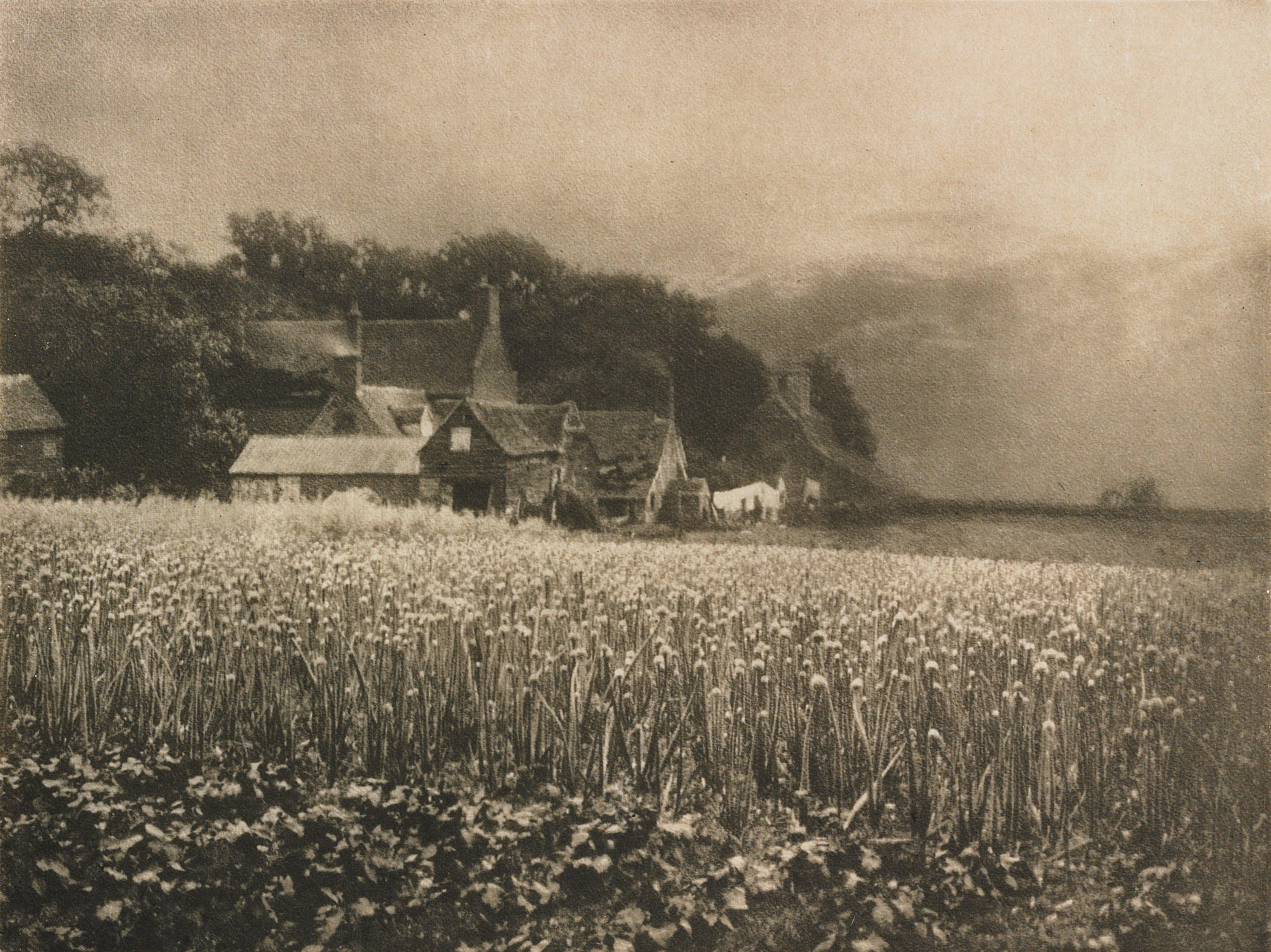
The Onion Field by George Davison (1889), often cited as a key example of photographic Impressionism.

Impressionist photography is a term occasionally used to describe certain pictorialist photographs from the late 19th and early 20th centuries that emphasize mood, atmosphere, and subjective vision over sharp detail and realism. While not directly aligned with the French Impressionist painters such as Monet or Renoir, some early photographers adopted similar concerns for light, temporality, and personal impression. The label was most notably associated with the work of George Davison, whose 1889 photograph The Onion Field is often cited as a foundational example.

In The Onion Field, Davison employed a pinhole camera and printing techniques that deliberately blurred detail, creating an effect reminiscent of tonal painting. This approach contrasted with the dominant aesthetic of clarity and sharpness in mainstream photography of the time. Though Davison did not formally label himself an "Impressionist," the visual affinities between his work and the contemporaneous painting movement led critics and historians to use the term "photographic Impressionism" during the early 20th century.

Over time, the phrase fell out of academic use and was largely subsumed under the broader category of pictorialism, an international photographic movement that valued artistic manipulation and hand-crafted printing processes. However, the poetic and experimental spirit of photographic Impressionism remains influential in discussions of photography's relationship to other visual arts.

== Pictorialist heritage and influence of Impressionism ==
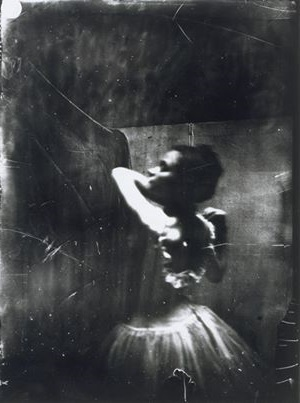
Photograph of a ballerina by Edgar Degas (circa 1895).

In the 1890s, Edgar Degas briefly engaged in photography, creating portraits of his close ones and interior scenes under artificial light. This private practice extended his pictorial research on movement, oblique framing, and light play. Although marginal in his oeuvre, this photographic production demonstrates an experimental approach to blur and atmosphere, resonating with certain Impressionist concerns. Degas primarily photographed in a private setting, but several exhibitions and publications have highlighted this lesser-known aspect of his work.

== Stylistic characteristics ==
Impressionist photography is defined by a set of visual and technical strategies aimed at evoking atmosphere, mood, and subjectivity over sharp documentation or narrative precision. These approaches often mirror concerns found in late 19th-century painting, particularly Impressionism and Symbolism.

Some of the main stylistic characteristics include:

- Soft focus and blur techniques: Pictorialist photographers frequently used pinhole cameras, gauze, soft-focus lenses, or darkroom manipulation to produce images where sharpness was deliberately reduced. This technique aimed to replicate the imprecise, dreamlike qualities of memory and perception.
- Use of natural or diffused light: Much like the Impressionist painters, photographic impressionists sought to capture changing light conditions — especially raking light, backlighting, and atmospheric haze — to create a sense of transience.
- Reflection and transparency: Water, glass, mist, and layered surfaces were used both to obscure and enhance visual elements, playing with ambiguity and depth. This visual vocabulary echoed Symbolist art and the desire to represent the intangible.
- Mood over narrative: The goal was less to tell a story than to suggest an emotional or poetic state. Many works eliminated temporal or geographic specificity in favor of a timeless, universal feel.
- Visual impermanence: Impressionist photography often conveyed a sense of the fleeting moment — a key principle inherited from painting — through motion blur, dissolving edges, or tonal gradients that emphasized the ephemerality of the visual world.

== See also ==
- Impressionism
- Pictorialism
- History of photography
