= Paul Martin (photographer) =

British photographer

Paul Martin (April 16, 1864– July 7, 1944) was a French-born British photographer who pioneered both street and night photography.

== Early life ==
Paul Augustus Martin was born in Herbeuville, France in 1864 in Alsace-Lorraine, but in the wake of the Franco-Prussian war and experiencing dire poverty during the Paris Commune fled with his family as a child to England in 1872. There, from 1873-1878, he attended an English school, then returned to France to continue his schooling 1878-80 at École Gosserez, Châlons-sur-Marne, before being apprenticed to a wood engraver 1880-1883.

== Photographer ==
Martin's strong talent in drawing brought him work in Fleet Street as a wood engraver where much of his work would have involved copying photographs, wood engraving being then the means of reproducing them in newspapers. He had first experimented in photography when he was ten years old, but he was nineteen before he purchased his first dry-plate camera in 1884 and joined camera clubs to learn as much as he could about the medium.

== Street Photography ==
The camera Martin used, the Fallowfield Facile detective camera, became available in 1889 and was considered a ‘hand camera’. Constructed of mahogany with a simple reflex viewfinder on the top, rendering a waist-level view, it weighed only 1.8 kg, and was camouflaged in brown paper to resemble a parcel. Plates were stored in an internal rack and flipped down once exposed. His camera presents us with a waist-level view, a child’s perspective on the scene in effect, and equally inquisitive. Though modest and shy, during his lunch hours Martin started photographing on the surrounding streets of London, as a means of improving and testing his technique; “It is impossible to describe the thrill which taking the first snaps without being noticed gave one,” he said. The people he photographed were workers and craftspeople, working class subjects less confronting than the gentry who would have felt entitled to challenge him. though his imagery of the less privileged is sympathetic, it was not motivated by any urge for reform which inspired the later work of Jacob Riis, for example.

The viewfinder of the camera Martin used was rudimentary and served only to aim, rather than to compose, so his pictures have a snapshot appearance, with the subject placed at centre in the frame and inclusions of unintended detail at the edges. Martin reported that reactions from fellow camera club members...

were not encouraging towards the type of subject which I was then taking … many members regarded some of my studies as rather infra dig, or even shocking. They felt that a plate demanded a noble and dignified subject, a cathedral or mountain or family party dressed up in their Sunday best.

though he admitted that;

Had I independent means, I should probably have pursued exactly the same roads as the other pictorial workers of the nineties whose ambition it was to make their photographs look as much like a painted picture as they could. Careful composition, superimposed clouds, soft printing and other technical tricks were used to produce effects which were certainly beautiful, but which took the photographer further and further away from life. I was for a time as keen as anyone and fairly competent, but it was an expensive hobby and never really had the same interest for me as the real snapshot – that is, people and things as the man on the street sees them.

In the middle of the 1890s, Martin adapted his process of making images for lantern slides; this was the final product which he showed at club meetings and in competitions. These he would mask with opaque material and a high contrast copy negative made so that the subject was isolated from the busy backgrounds for which his photographs are now so highly valued as honest records of Victorian life. The strategy also protected him from any legal issues that might arise from what else the images might show, such as copyright commercial signs and from intruding on the privacy of especially upper-class who might stray into the frame.

As Martin explained in an article in Amateur Photographer (6 November 1896), ‘‘When I first saw one of these slides the idea struck me . . . that living objects might be substituted for the statues.” His purpose shows in the centralised compositions which he intended later to crop and mask. Despite this stricture, and in an appeal to the prevailing Victorian taste, Martin has an eye for the anecdotal genre, the theatre of interactions between his subjects, and this is sometimes reflected in his titles, such as Ice-Cream Barrow, An Altercation (1893–96). Cecil Beaton dubbed him the 'Charles Dickens of the lens'.

== Night photography ==
Martin was awarded the Royal Photographic Society’s Royal Medal in 1896, not for his lantern slides but for his series of pictures shot at night during the winter of 1895-6; London by Gaslight, one of the first serious attempts at night photography that attracted the admiration of Alfred Steiglitz, who produced his own series on Manhattan at night (1898), and prompted the formation of the amateur Society of Night Photographers. In an article for The Photogram, Martin described his experiments; his photographs on isochromatic plates required exposures of ten to fifteen minutes. Given that his was the first photography of the city at night, his unfamiliar activities with a camera in the dark aroused the curiosity of passers-by and he was often followed by the police.

== Commercial photographer ==
From 1893 to 1909, Martin was an active member of The Linked Ring group of art photographers. However, in 1899 he set up a photographic firm in partnership with Harry Gordon Dorrett as Dorrett & Martin at 16 Bellevue Road, Wandsworth Common, after which he no longer had time to make street photographs. His most lucrative business was portraiture and a sideline in producing button badges containing portraits of popular military figures during WW1. He also photographed historic events such as the funeral of Queen Victoria (1901), the great frost of 1895, and the coronation of Edward VII (1902). Though he sold such pictures to the press, few were published. He continued to photograph for recreation in the Cornwall, Brittany and Swiss landscapes. He closed his studio in 1926, and when his street photography started to attract the interest of collectors including Helmut Gernsheim, he gladly and cheaply sold them his remaining negatives. The producer of a number of inventions that improved the medium, his estate amounted to little more than £4000 when he died in Hosack Road, Balham, in July 1944.

== Legacy ==
Paul Martin's work is held in major collections in England and America and is frequently exhibited in themed exhibitions that recognise his pioneering contributions to the medium.

A Green Plaque commemorating Paul Martin and his work, installed in 2025 at his former studio, Dorrett & Martin, 16 Bellevue Road opposite Wandsworth Common, was funded by the National Lottery Heritage Fund for Wandsworth's year as London Borough of Culture.

== Exhibitions ==
=== Solo ===
- 1896 London by Gaslight, Royal Photographic Society, London.
- 1929 Wimbledon Camera Club

=== Group ===
- 1937 Photography 1839–1937, March 17–April 18, 1937, The Museum of Modern Art, New York.
- 1938 Century of Photography, Victoria and Albert Museum
- 1944 Art in Progress: 15th Anniversary Exhibitions: Photography, May 24–September 17, 1944, The Museum of Modern Art Archives, New York
- 1959 Photographs from the Museum Collection, November 26, 1958 – January 18, 1959, The Museum of Modern Art Archives, New York
- 1964 Art in a Changing World: 1884–1964: Edward Steichen Photography Center, May 27, 1964, The Museum of Modern Art Archives, New York
- 1999/2000 MoMA2000, ModernStarts, People: Posed to Unposed: Encounters with the Camera, October 7, 1999 – February 1, 2000, The Museum of Modern Art, New York

== Publications ==
- Martin, Paul, n.d. [1978?], A Yarmouth Holiday, (London: Nishen Photography) [Introduction by Mark Haworth-Booth]
- Flukinger, Roy; Schaaf, Larry J. (Larry John), 1947-, (joint author.); Meacham, Standish, (joint author.) (1977), Paul Martin : Victorian photographer, University of Texas Press, ISBN 978-0-292-76436-1
- Jay, Bill; Martin, Paul, 1864-1944 (1973), Victorian candid camera : Paul Martin, 1864-1944, David and Charles, ISBN 978-0-7153-6085-9

== Collections ==
- Gernsheim Collection, University of Texas at Austin
- Radio Times Hulton Picture Library (now Getty Images)
- Royal Photographic Society, London
- Victoria and Albert Museum
- National Science and Media Museum, Bradford, England
- Fine Arts Library of the University of New Mexico in Albuquerque.
- Museum of Modern Art, New York.
