= Alexander Keighley =

Alexander Keighley (3 February 1861 – 2 August 1947) was an English amateur photographer who became one of the most influential members of the Pictorialist movement in Great Britain in the 20th century.

== Biography ==
Alexander Keighley was the son of a wealthy Yorkshire mill owner. His father, Joseph Keighley, was of knightly descent. Keighley studied at the Keighley Trade and Grammar School, which later came to be known as the Mechanics Institute. The institute placed an emphasis on science and practical skills. Keighley was particularly interested in biology and won a scholarship to continue his scientific studies at the School of Mines (later the Royal College of Science) in London. He was particularly enthusiastic about the lectures by Thomas Huxley, with whom he studied biology, geology and botany. In 1879 he became a founding member of the Keighley Scientific and Literary Society. Keighley then planned to study medicine, but no sooner had his courses finished than his father obliged him to join the family business. Keighley would go on to become a director of the Sudgen Keighley Company in 1886 and remain so until his retirement in 1923.

In 1905 Keighley married Lily Howroyd of Bradford. Alexander Keighley died on 2 August 1947, in the town that shares his name, Keighley.

== Career ==
=== Photography ===
When Keighley gave his first public lecture on the geology of Airedale, at a Yorkshire Naturalist's Union outing in 1883, he saw a geologist using the new photographic dry plate. This inspired Keighley to obtain some photographic equipment and set up a darkroom in the attic.

He started by photographing his family and relatives, and their homes and gardens. Influenced by Henry Peach Robinson's work and writings, he also tried his hand at pictorialist photography. Keighley soon joined the Bradford Photographic Society, which was mainly interested in the technical processes of photography.

His first major success was in 1887, when he submitted twelve prints to a competition held by the journal The Amateur Photographer. Jury member P.H. Emerson would later criticize his then orientation towards sharp focus and called him a "gum-splodger". Despite this Keighley still managed to win, and be placed ahead of Alfred Stieglitz, who only achieved second place. In 1889 he contributed four photographs to a major exhibition of the Photographic Society of Great Britain (later known as the Royal Photographic Society).

In 1892, Keighley joined a group of well-known amateur photographers who, due to insufficient recognition of their art, would go on to found the Linked Ring group. Over the next 15 years Keighley's work received some limited recognition in the press. In 1898 Keighley became President of the Bradford Photographic Society, whose exhibitions were held at the Bradford Art Gallery and from which the Yorkshire Photographic Union was formed in 1899. It was on the death in 1908 of the photographer A. Horsley Hinton that Keighley became 'the most prominent landscapist within the British pictorial school'.

In 1910, he joined the Royal Photographic Society (RPS). In the same year, the RPS organised his first solo exhibition in London. A year later, he became a Fellow of the Royal Photographic Society. From then on, Keighley's work was presented in many solo and group exhibitions. In 1924, he became an honorary member of the RPS. From 1938 to 1939, Keighley drove 6,000 miles across South Africa to keep in touch with the photographic organizations there.

For fifty years, Keighley would each year produce five to six pictures of the highest artistic quality - an astonishing achievement at the time. In the summer of 1943, the RPS exhibited a large-scale retrospective of Keighley's work at Bradford Art Gallery, showing the development of his work. After his death in 1947, the RPS also organized an exhibition in his honor in London.

=== Equipment ===
At the beginning of his career, Keighley used a full-plate camera. Keighley had an assistant to help him with his equipment. His camera had a "Goerz-Celor" anastigmatic lens with a lens hood and a yellow filter. The focus was fixed at 10 meters.

The advent of faster photographic emulsions and hand-held cameras meant that shorter exposure-times could be used. From then on, Keighley used a 1/4 plate box camera from then on. The camera was so small (compared to full-plate cameras) that it looked like a small brown parcel. Keighley made use of this inconspicuousness on his many travels, as many of the natives of the countries he visited were suspicious of the camera's 'evil eye'.

=== Working method ===
Keighley liked to photograph nature, and people in natural surroundings. He also sometimes tried to capture and depict 'mystical' objects. Most of his pictures were taken outside of the UK. Keighley enjoyed photographing abroad and he made annual trips to new countries. He photographed in (amongst others) France, Spain, Italy, Greece, Lebanon, Egypt, Morocco, South Africa, and China.

Early on in his photographic career, Keighley used sharp focus. However, from 1890, probably after seeing George Davison's Impressionist photographs, he developed his own Impressionist style. His photographs have been described as poetic, lyrical, and romantic.

His first prints were made using albumen paper. He would go on to experiment with different processes, using platinum, oil, bromine oil and gum bichromate. Eventually, Keighley would come to mainly use of charcoal for his prints.

Keighley would enlarge his 'quarter-plate' negatives to produce full-plate-sized prints. He would combine several different negatives to produce a print. He also often enlarged his 10x20" pictures considerably – mostly to a size of 16x20 or 24x30 inches (=60x75 cm), which was unusual at the time.

He would also intensify dark tones when he felt it necessary, eliminating unwanted details, adding accents and playing with tonal variations to create the desired atmosphere. He sometimes retouched his charcoal engravings so much that one could only guess at the negative that had produced it. Because of this, his pictures were often referred to as "camera-paintings".

== Exhibitions ==
=== Solo ===
The number in brackets indicates how many works were exhibited

- 1910 Royal Photographic Society, London (45)
- 1912 Paris (40) and Vienna (40)
- 1913 Munich (40)
- 1917 Washington DC, USA (66)
- 1920 New York Camera Club, New York (54)
- 1923 Washington DC, (67)
- 1930 Chicago (47)
- 1933 Paris (64)

Many other exhibitions took place between 1923 and 1941. For example: London (The Camera Club), Cleveland, Birmingham, Hampshire House (Hammersmith), Rochester, Boston, Rugby, Loughborough, and many more. ... in which between 30 and 61 photographs were exhibited.

- 1943 Royal Photographic Society, London and Bradford Art Gallery, Bradford
- 1947 Royal Photographic Society, London

=== Group ===
- 1889 The Photographic Society of Great Britain (later R.P.S.) London
- 1899 Salon, Philadelphia (USA)
- 1903 8e Salon International de la Photographie, Paris; Photographic Salon, London
- 1904 Salon du Photo-Club, Paris
- 1905 Exposition Internationale, Genova (Italien); Salon du Photo-Club, Paris
- 1906 Salon du Photo-Club, Paris; Photographic Salon, London
- 1907 The Scottish Salon (GB)
- 1913 Exposition S.F.P., Paris
- 1924 Stockholm
- 1927 Salon International de la Photographie, Paris
- 1930 XXIXe Salon International d’Art Photographique, Paris
- 1978 PICTORIAL PHOTOGRAPHY IN BRITAIN
- 1900–1920, Hayward Gallery, London

== Selected works ==
- See-Saw, 1883.
- My Lady’s Garden, 1899.
- The White Sail, 1901.
- Grace before Meat, 1901.
- The Olive Branch, 1904.
- A Spring Idyll, 1904.
- The Shepherdess, 1905.
- Calle del Duomo, Chioggia, 1906.
- The Bridge, 1906.
- A Spring Pastoral, 1907.
- The Rest is Silence, 1909.
- Fantasy, 1913.
- The Sphinx, 1915.
- The Harp of the Winds, 1917.
- A Castle of Romance, 1917.
- The Gathering of the Flock, 1924.
- Three Boats, 1923.
- A Greek Temple, 1926.
- A Bridge, Montenegro, 1927.
- Adieu, 1932.
- The River Bed, 1934.
- Ali Baba’s Cave, 1934.
- A Castle in Spain, 1935.
- At the Palace Gate, 1936.
- The Family, 1936.
- The Sheik, 1937.
- The Keeper of the Mosque, 1940.
- The Church Steps, 1940.
- Service Time, 1941.
- The Old Cloister, 1942.
- Woodland, 1943.

== Literature ==
- Michèle Auer: Encyclopédie internationale des photographes de 1839 à nos jours. = Photographers encyclopaedia international 1839 to the present. 2 Bände. Camera Obscura, Hermance 1985, .
- Cecil Beaton, Gail Buckland: The magic image. The genius of photography from 1839 to the present day. Little, Brown, Boston MA u. a. 1975, S. 120–121.
- Josef Gottschammel (Hrsg.): Alex. Keighley (= Meisterbücher der Photographie. Bd. 2). Edition Die Galerie, Wien 1937, S. 3.
- J. L. Hankey, J. Dudley Johnston: Alex. Keighley, artist and photographer. = Alexander Keighley. A memorial. Royal Photographic Society of Great Britain, London 1947, S. 5–23.
- John Hannavy (Hrsg.): Encyclopedia of nineteenth-century photography. Band 2: J – Z, Index. Routledge, New York NY u. a. 2008, ISBN 978-0-415-97235-2, S. 792.
- Margaret Harker: The linked ring. The secession movement in photography in Britain, 1892–1910 (= A royal photographic society publication). Heinemann, London 1979, ISBN 0-434-31360-2, S. 92, 155–156.
- John Taylor: Pictorial photography in Britain 1900–1920. Arts Council of Great Britain, London 1978, ISBN 0-7287-0171-5, S. 81–82.
