= Alfred Horsley Hinton =

English photographer

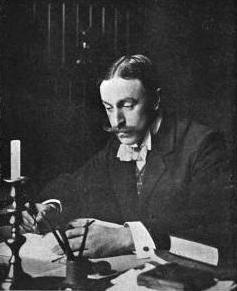
- Hinton, photographed by Percy G. R. Wright, c. 1904
- Born: 1863; London, England
- Died: 25 February 1908; Woodford Green, England
- Resting place: City of London Cemetery
- Occupations: Photographer, writer, editor
- Notable work: The Handbook of Illustration (1895), Artistic Landscape photography (1896), Practical Pictorial Photography (1898)

Alfred Horsley Hinton (1863 – 25 February 1908) was an English landscape photographer, best known for his work in the pictorialist movement in the 1890s and early 1900s. As an original member of the Linked Ring and editor of The Amateur Photographer, he was one of the movement's staunchest advocates. Hinton wrote nearly a dozen books on photographic technique, and his photographs were exhibited at expositions throughout Europe and North America.

== Life ==
Hinton was born in London in 1863. He attended art school with the hopes of becoming a painter, and became proficient in oil, watercolors, and black-and-white drawing. By 1882, he had discovered photography, and was hired as editor of the Photographic Art Journal in 1887. Hinton briefly worked for a company in Blackfriars selling photographic equipment before taking over a branch portrait studio of Ralph W. Robinson in Guildford in 1891. In 1893, he was hired as editor of The Amateur Photographer, a position he retained for the rest of his life.

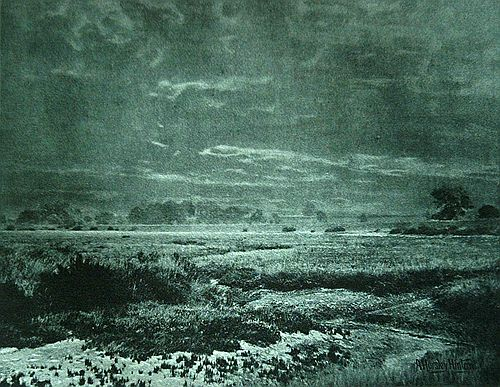
Salt Marshes

During the late 1880s, Hinton became one of a growing number of photographers who believed that photography should be considered a form of high art, a movement that became known as pictorialism. Pictorialism, according to Hinton, employed "the image of concrete things to create abstract ideas." He exhibited several photographs at an early-1890s Leeds exposition described by his contemporary, Alexander Keighley, as the first pictorialist exposition, and was one of the original members of the Linked Ring, an organisation formed in 1892 to promote photography as a fine art.

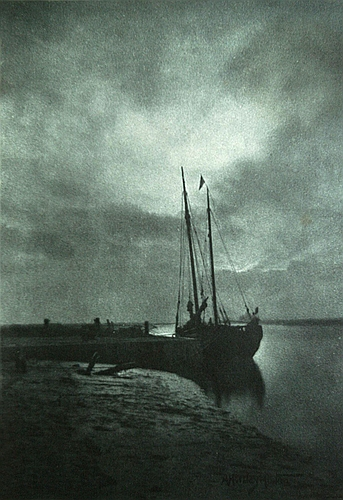
Requiem

Hinton helped organise the Photographic Salon in 1893, and became the primary English correspondent for the Bulletin of the French pictorialist group, the Photo Club of Paris. A poll conducted by Photographic Life in 1897 found Hinton to be the most popular photographer-exhibiter.

Hinton's staunch defence of pictorialism gained him numerous enemies. His attempt to join the Royal Photographic Society touched off a fierce debate among the readers of the British Journal of Photography, with numerous letters written both in support of his membership and against it. Hinton was a member of the Royal Photographic Society between 1889 and 1893. He continued his defence of pictorialism into the following century, and was unimpressed with the rise of the "American School," which included photographers such as Edward Steichen (Steichen once referred to Hinton as a "slimy snake").

During the early 1900s, Hinton was a regular contributor to the London Times, The Daily Telegraph, the Daily Graphic, and the Yorkshire Post, and was frequently called upon to judge photo contests. In 1904, he oversaw the British photographic exhibit at the St. Louis World's Fair, and he spent his last years writing manuals ("Little Books") to teach photographers basic techniques. In February 1908, he fell ill while returning from a trip to the Scottish Photographic Salon in Aberdeen, and died at his home in Woodford Green. The Royal Photographic Society held an exclusive exhibit of Hinton's work in April 1908.

== Works ==
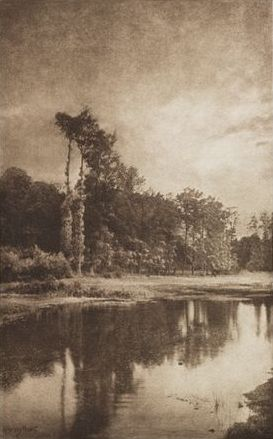
Melton Meadows

Hinton's landscape photographs tend to be characterised by prominent foregrounds and dramatic cloud formations, often in a vertical format. He typically used sepia platinotype and gum bichromate printing processes. Unlike many pictorialists, Hinton preferred sharp focus to soft focus lenses. He occasionally cropped and mixed cloud scenes and foregrounds from different photographs, and was known to rearrange the foregrounds of his subjects to make them more pleasing. His favourite topic was the English countryside, especially the Essex mud flats and Yorkshire moors.

Hinton's photograph, "Requiem," was used as the frontispiece of the first issue of Alfred Stieglitz's magazine, Camera Notes, in 1897. His photograph, "Day's Decline," appeared in Volume 3, Issue 1 of Camera Notes two years later. "Reed Harvesting," was exhibited at the first London Salon in 1894, and his "Salt Marshes" was exhibited at the first Paris Salon that same year. Hinton photographs that garnered considerable attention at the Photographic Salon in subsequent years included "Recessional" (1901), "Weeds and Rushes" (1902), "Fleeting and Far" (1903), and "The White Mill" (1907). In a 1907 issue of The Photographic News, Hinton described "Melton Meadows" as his best photograph.

Hinton's "Melton Meadows," "Beyond," "Recessional," "Woods and Rushes," "Fleeting Far," and "Niagara," are now part of the Royal Photographic Society collection, held by the Victoria and Albert Museum. "Fleeting Shadows" is part of the Metropolitan Museum of Art's collections.

== Bibliography ==
=== Books ===
Author

- The Handbook of Illustration (1895)
- Artistic Landscape Photography (1896)
- Platinotype Printing (1898)
- Practical Pictorial Photography (1898)
- P.O.P: A Simple Book of Instruction in the Use of Silver Printing Out Paper (1902)
- Sure and Easy Development of Plates and Films (1904)
- Home Portraiture Made Easy (1907)
- How to Ensure Correct Exposure (1907)
- To Make Bad Negatives into Good: Elementary Lessons for Beginners in Photography Simply Told (1907)

Contributor

- "Negative-Making: Exposure, Development, and After-Treatment," in The Barnet Book of Photography (1898)
- Introduction to The Use of the Hand Camera by Clive Holland (1898)
- "In Austria and Germany," in Art in Photography (1905)

=== Magazines ===
- Photographic Art, editor, 1887–1889
- The Amateur Photographer, editor, 1893–1908

== Gallery ==
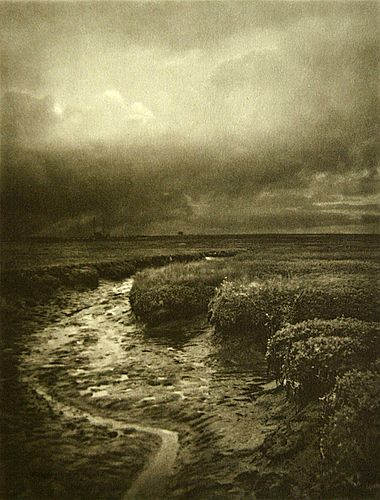
Gathering Weather

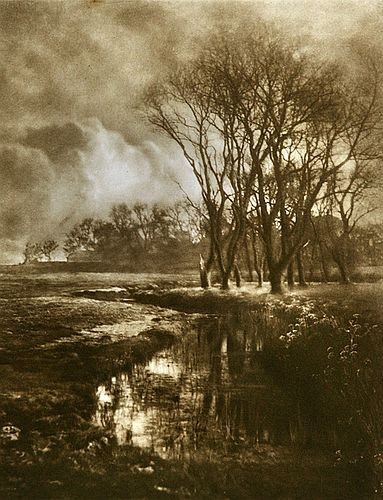
Motif from Suffolk

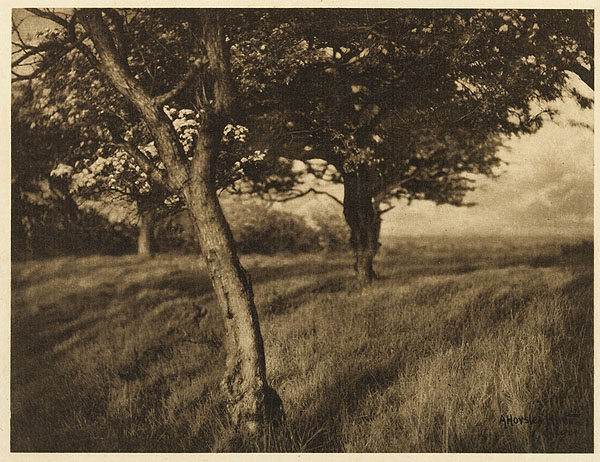
Beyond

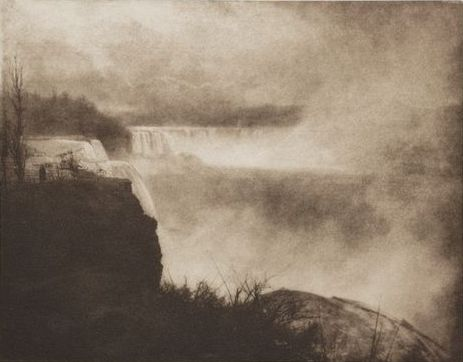
Niagara

== See also ==
- Constant Puyo
