= Henry Van der Weyde =

Dutch-British-American painter and photographer

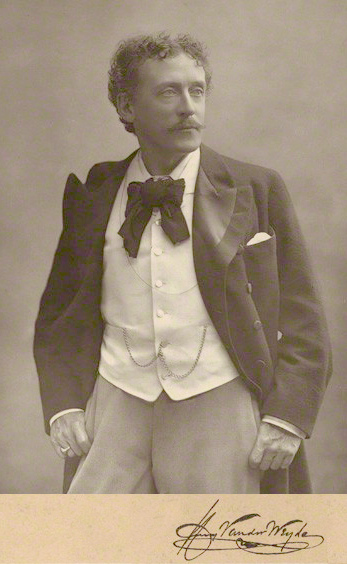
Henry Van der Weyde in November 1891

Henry Van der Weyde (1838–1924) was a Dutch-born English painter and photographer, best known for his photographic portraits of the late 19th century. His is considered a photographic pioneer in the use of electric light in photography. Amongst his portraits are architect William Burges (c.1880), Alexandra, Princess of Wales, A. E. Housman, actresses Mary Anderson (1887) and Dorothy Dene (1880s), Sir Edwin Arnold, bodybuilder Eugen Sandow (1889) and explorer Fridtjof Nansen (1897).

== Biography ==
He was born Pieter Hendrik van der Weijde at Zierikzee in the Netherlands on 30 August 1838. He was the son of Doctor Pieter Hendrik van der Weijde Sr. and Jeannette Wilhelmina Lasserre. In 1850 his family emigrated to the United States and he later served in the American Civil War. He emigrated to England in 1870. He set up his photographic studio at 182 Regent Street in London in 1877, and began using the logo "The Van der Weyde Light". That year he became the first photographer to install and take portraits by electric light which permitted him to make many portraits in a short period of time. A founding member of the Linked Ring Brotherhood, in 1892 he publicised his photo corrector (Rectograph) which is said to have "caused a stir in the world of photography".

== Gallery ==
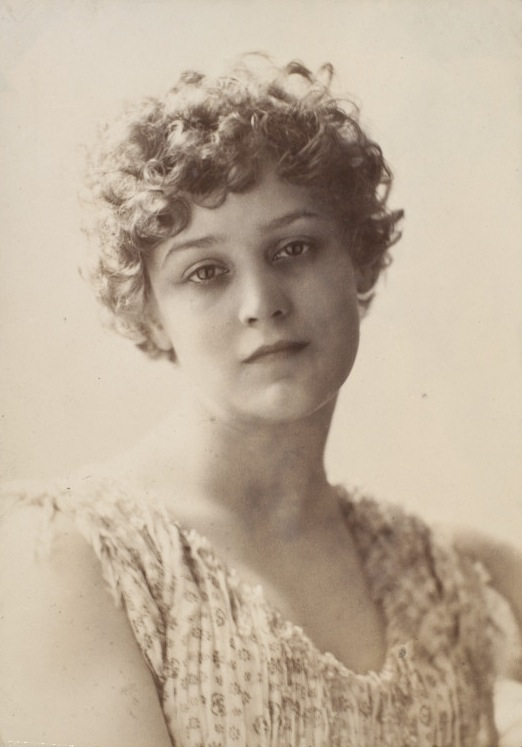
Dorothy Dene, actress and model

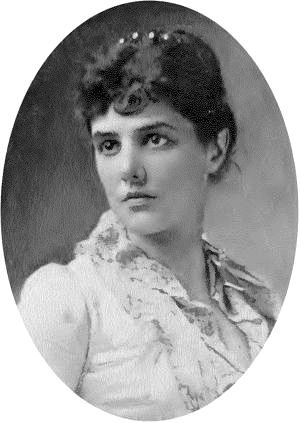
Jennie Jerome, mother of Winston Churchill

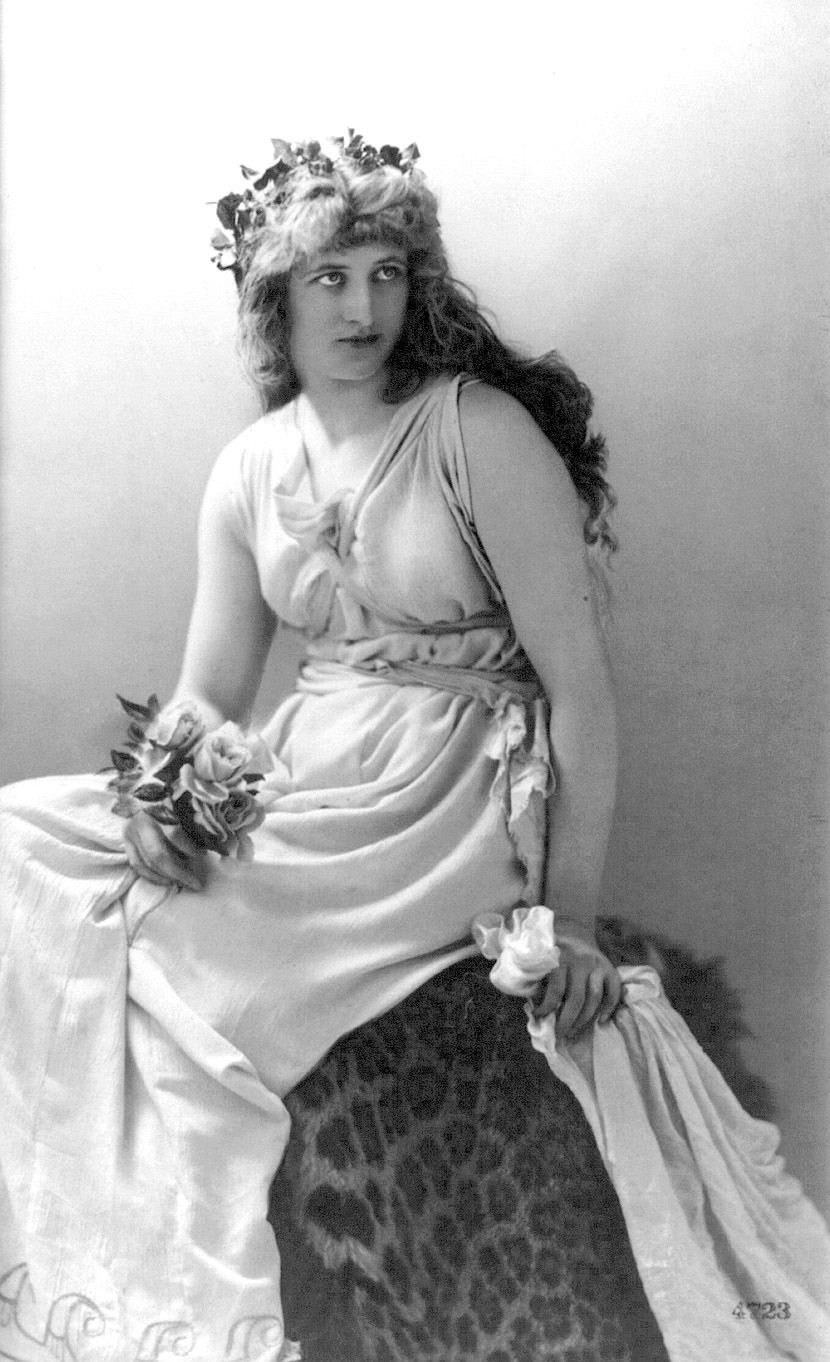
Mary Anderson as Perdita

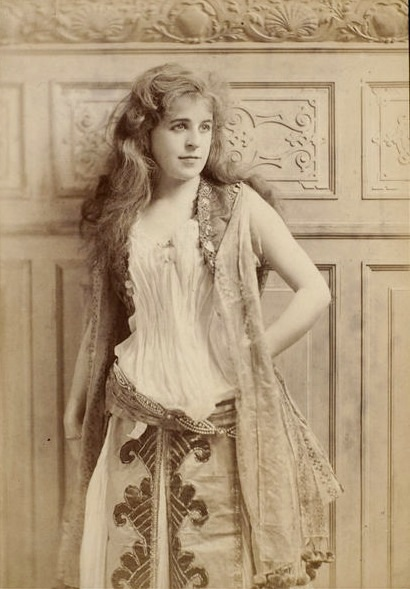
Rose Norreys (1866-1946), actress

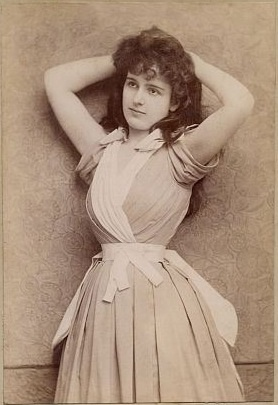
Lillian Seccombe (1872-?), actress

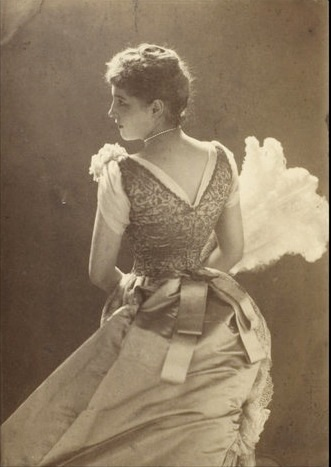
Lillie Langtry, actress

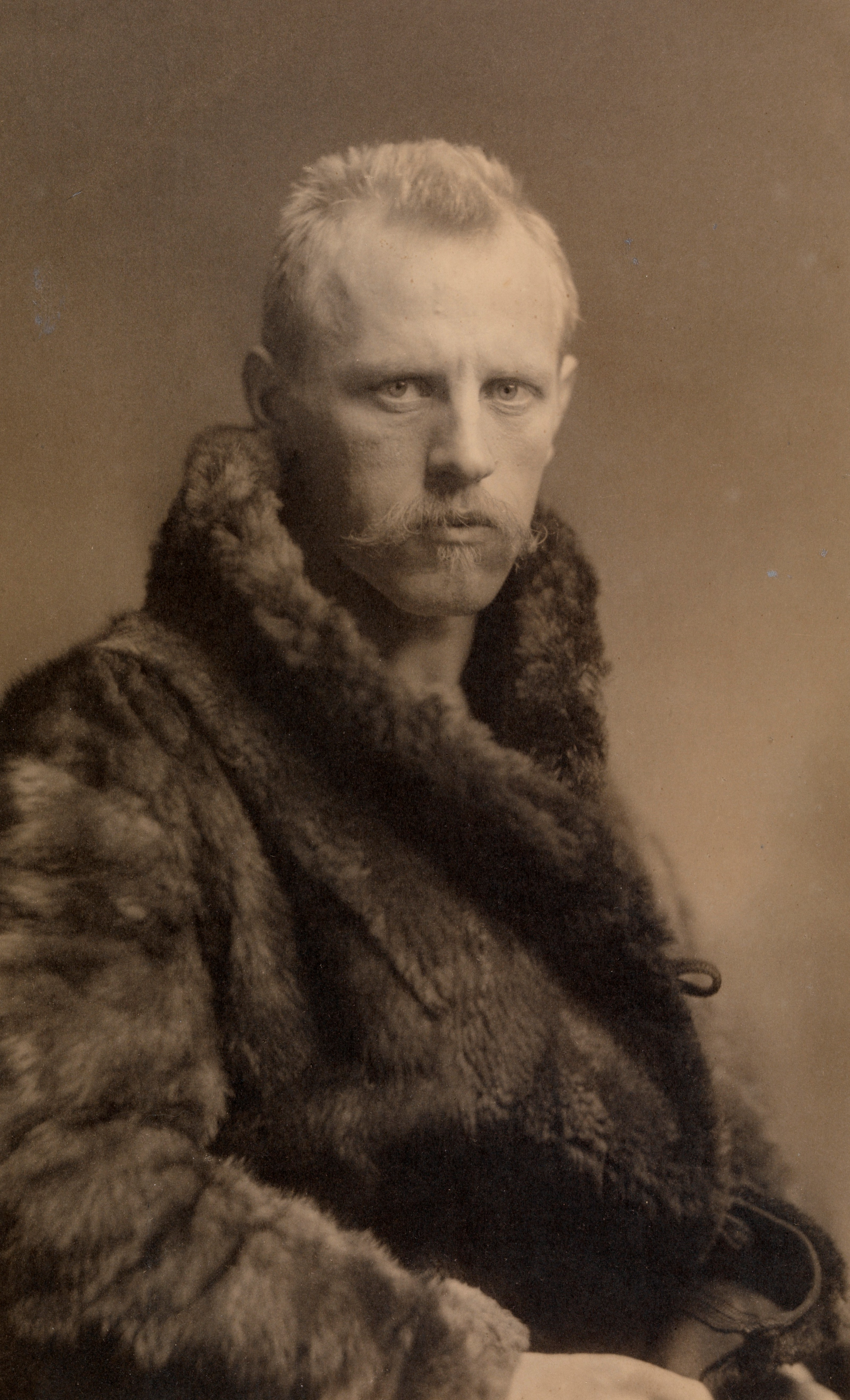
Fridtjof Nansen, Arctic explorer

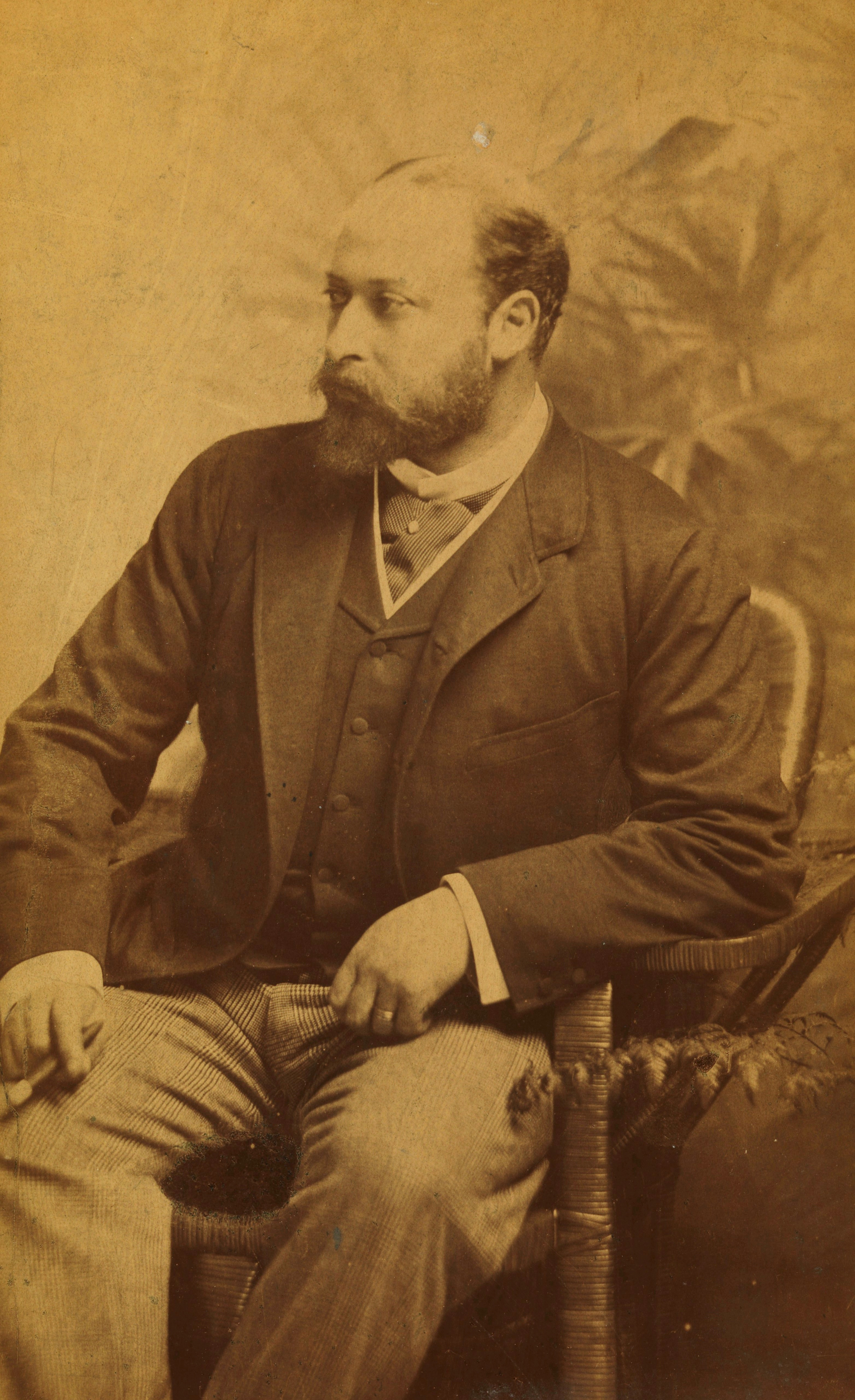
Edward VII, King of the United Kingdom
