= Photographic Alliance of Great Britain =

The Photographic Alliance of Great Britain (known as the PAGB) is the umbrella organisation that provides benefits and co-ordinates specific events for the majority of photographic clubs and societies in England, Scotland, Wales & Northern Ireland. (Hence its scope is in fact not merely Great Britain, but rather the United Kingdom.)

The PAGB does this through 15 regional organisations known as federations. These events and benefits apply variously to individual photographers, to societies and clubs, and to the federations themselves.

== History ==
Photographers joined to form photographic clubs and societies from the early-1840s onwards. The Leeds Photographic Society was established in 1852, and the Photographic Society of London in January 1853 (which became the Royal Photographic Society).

=== Affiliation ===
The Royal Photographic Society, then known as the Photographic Society of Great Britain, became central in acting as a coordinating body for camera clubs and photographic societies in Britain, and the Society was frequently referred to as the 'parent body' in its relationship to other British photographic organisations. The strengthening of links between clubs and societies was started in 1890 when the Society considered a proposal to establish a photographic institute which it circulated to all societies. This scheme failed to gain momentum and an affiliation committee was established which reported back to The Society's Council in April 1891. An alternative affiliation scheme promoted by The Camera Club in London failed to gain any significant support.

The 1891 committee noted that 'it would be desirable if the majority of local Photographic Societies could be affiliated to the Parent Society...such a scheme ought to be practical and useful'. The scheme would:

1. Be eligible to any photographic society in the United Kingdom.
2. admittance be confirmed by the Council of the Photographic Society of Great Britain.
3. Each affiliated Society pay a small subscription.
4. A conference of delegates should be held to promote uniformity of work between societies, devising means for mutual co-operation and inter-communication.
5. there should be a standing committee of which the Assistant Secretary of the Photographic Society should be secretary.
6. Each affiliated Society should have, say, two transferable tickets admitting to all meetings and perhaps the exhibition of the Society. One copy of the Journal should be sent to all affiliated society.

An alternative independent scheme of affiliation was proposed and sent to the various London societies but there seemed to be a consensus that the Photographic Society's scheme was preferred and in July 1891 a formal affiliation scheme was adopted which adopted some of the six points outlined in April and some of the aims of the institute scheme proposed the previous November. The first meeting of delegates took place on 1 February 1892 which dealt with minor revision of the rules and negotiating the relationship ship between the societies and the Parent society. Further meetings took place in March. The published list of affiliated societies in February 1892 contained twenty-four societies, including the Photographic Society of India. From 1892 reports dealing with affiliated societies and activities began to appear regularly in The Photographic Journal and an annual list of affiliated Societies was published.

=== Early federations ===
During the period from 1892 to 1930 various photographic unions of individual photographic clubs were formed, the first of which was the Yorkshire Photographic Union formed in 1899 as a regional grouping of photographic clubs and societies. This was followed by the Northern Counties Photographic Federation in 1901, the Scottish Photographic Federation in 1903, the Lancashire and Cheshire Photographic Union in 1905, the Midland Counties Photographic Federation in 1907, and the East Anglian Federation in 1910.

By the late 1920s there was increasing pressure from other photographic societies and camera club to distance themselves from the Royal Photographic Society. The Society was less concerned with competition than local groups. Larger alliances were formed, for example, The Council of Photographic Federations in 1926.

=== The formation of the PAGB ===
Mr. J. S. Lancaster of the Midland Counties Photographic Federation proposed the formation of an Inter-Federation national body in a letter to the Royal Photographic Society President F F Renwick dated 4 March =1929, and The Society's affiliation scheme partly gave way to the formation of the Photographic Alliance, to act as an umbrella organisation for federations of societies, in 1930. The individual groupings retained their own identities and organisation within the PAGB, which provided a national body to give a structure to club photography: coordinating activities, competitions, and standards.

The RPS fully supported the formation of the Photographic Alliance. Those societies which were territorially in a federation became affiliated to the Society through their federation, and those societies which were not federated were formed into The Central Association of Photographic Societies and were directly affiliated to the Society. The negotiations with the RPS were led by Thomas H B Scott (the Society's President 1925–27), F F Renwick and Alexander Keighley in 1927 and Scott did much to promote the idea. The RPS made available the whole of its Affiliation lecture, portfolios and funds unreservedly at the disposal of the Alliance.

The Photographic Alliance was established by Articles of Association of the Royal Photographic Society and comprised the RPS; Northern Counties, Midland Counties and East Anglian Federations; the Yorkshire and the Lancashire and Cheshire Photographic Unions; and the Central Association of Photographic Societies. A meeting of the provisional executive committee was held on 8 March 1930, the Council of the RPS agreed that the Chairman of the Alliance need not be a member of the RPS, so reinforcing its status as a body semi-independent of the RPS. The constitution of the Alliance noted 'The business of the Alliance shall be conducted consistently with the Articles of Association of The Royal Photographic Society, and shall not interfere with the complete self-government of the constituent associations'. The Scottish Photographic Federation declined to join. The Alliance was formally launched at Leicester on 24 May 1930.

The details of these regional federations were not fixed. At first, all clubs that were not members of a regional grouping became members of the Central Association of Photographic Societies (CAPS), affiliated to PAGB. Eventually CAPS was replaced by other regional federations. Boundary changes have continued since then. But the overall structure, with the Photographic Alliance of Great Britain as the national body, has been stable for decades.

By 1936 the Alliance consisted of the six English Federations and Unions and the Central Association, totalling 310 individual societies. The Alliance published its own Year Book from 1933 to 1934 of which 1800 copies were distributed in 1936, and the Photographic Red Book which had been originally published by Affiliation from 1900 with a total of 6981 being sold in 1936.

Over time the PAGB gradually moved away from the Royal Photographic Society and is now a wholly independent body. The PAGB appoints a member of The Society's advisory board meetings and a Society Council member attends PAGB Executive Committee meetings as a full voting member, reporting on matters of interest to the Society's Council.

=== PAGB Archive ===
The Archive of photographs and documents of the PAGB were passed to Birmingham Central Library in 2011.

== Relationships ==
The Photographic Alliance of Great Britain comprises 15 federations based on geographical regions. The total number of clubs within all of these is over 1000, hence there are tens of thousands of photographers indirectly affiliated to the PAGB.

This hierarchy with the PAGB at the top is not one of control. The PAGB is not a governing body for federations, and neither are federations governing bodies for clubs. The hierarchy is one of service. Federations exist to serve the needs of clubs and their members, and the PAGB exists to serve the needs of all of those. These organisations are typically run by volunteers who are also club photographers.

The PAGB is a member of Fédération Internationale de l'Art Photographique (FIAP). So too are two of the federations of the PAGB, whose membership of FIAP pre-dated that of the PAGB, the Scottish Photographic Federation and the Welsh Photographic Federation.

== Awards ==
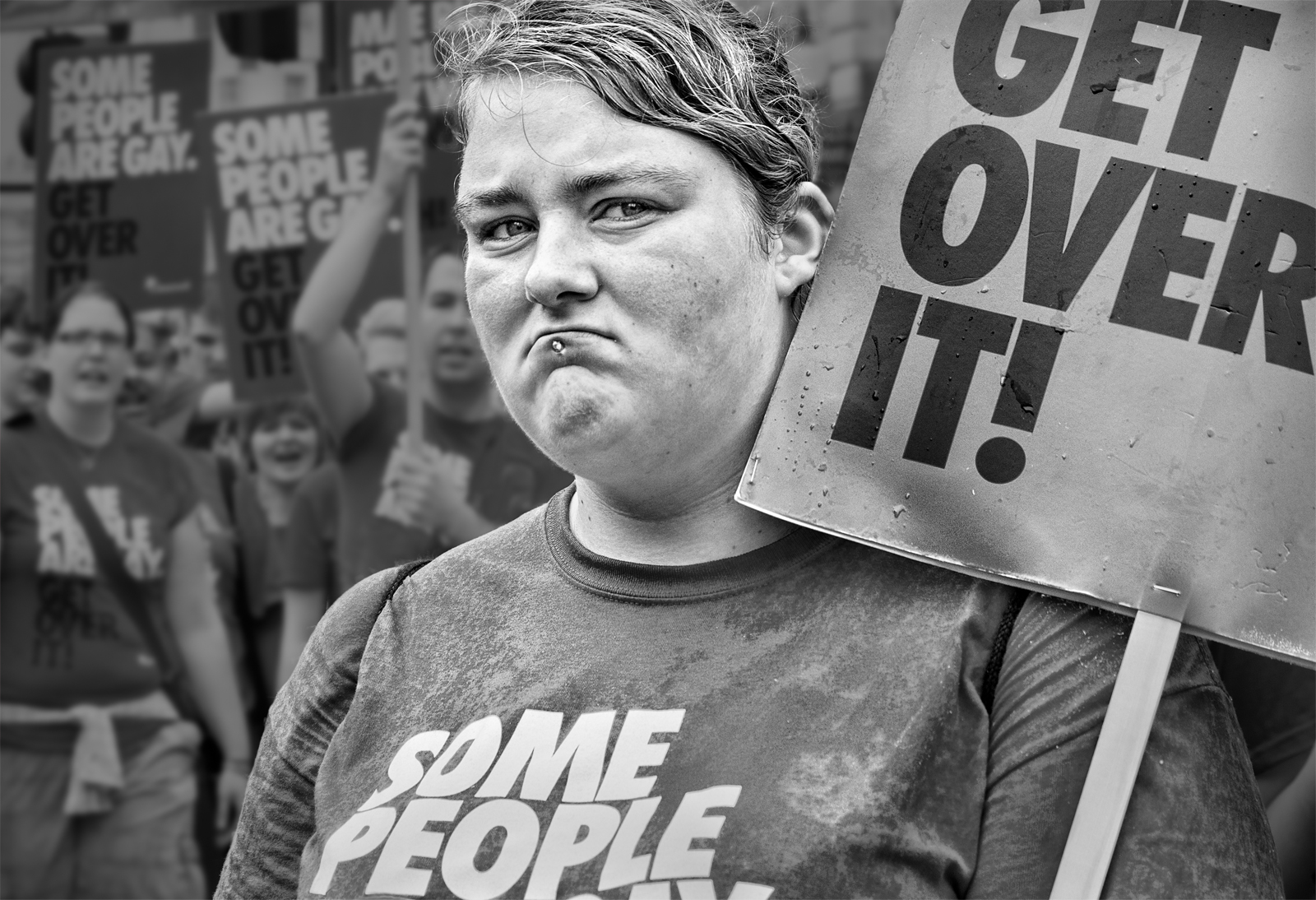
"Get over it" by Helen Jones gained a DPAGB in 2021

Awards are of two sorts: for photographic merit, and for outstanding services to the PAGB and/or its federations and their clubs, for example BPAGB (Badge PAGB), CPAGB (Credit PAGB), DPAGB (Distinction PAGB), EPAGB (Excellence PAGB), MPAGB (Master PAGB), APAGB (Meritorious Service Award of PAGB) and the J.S. Lancaster Medal (HonPAGB)

== Activities ==
The PAGB organises a number of national events and services. These include:

Competitions where Federations enter using the work of club photographers:

- Annual Inter-Federation Print Competitions and Touring Exhibition
- Previously there have also been Inter-Federation slide and later projected digital Categories and Exhibition

Inter-club competitions where the entrants are clubs chosen by each federation to represent them (plus the previous year's finalists):

- Annual Inter-Club PDI Championship, held at Warwick School
- Annual Inter-Club Print Championship, held at Blackburn, (previously at other venues including Deeside College at Connah's Quay)

Inter-club competitions where clubs make individual decisions to enter:

- The Great British Trophy (Prints) with Categories for Open and for Nature
- The Great British Cup (Projected) with Categories for Open, for Nature and for Limited entry Clubs

A bi-annual Slide Sound sequences weekend run in conjunction with the Royal Photographic Society:

- The National Audio Visual Championships
