= Walter Benington =

British photographer (1872–1936)

Walter Benington (1872–1936) was a British photographer. Working in the Victorian era and the first half of the twentieth century, his important contribution to early twentieth century photography has been more fully recognised in the doctoral thesis of Robert Crow.

== Biography ==
Walter Benington (sometimes spelt as Bennington) was born in 1872 in Stockton on Tees, in County Durham. He was the son of George and Helena Benington. The 1881 census shows his father's occupation as a Tea Dealer.

Benington married Kathleen Inez Whitwell (d. 1953) in 1905. The 1911 Census reveals that the couple had a son, Anthony, and a daughter Barbara. Benington's occupation is described as Photographer and his place of residence to be in Southgate in north London.

Benington died in 1936, his death registered in the Oxford district.

== Work and legacy ==
Benington started taking photographs while still at school. Taking his schoolboy hobby into adulthood Benington took up platinotype printing and pictorial landscape work. The platinotype process enables a greater tonal range than other chemical processes. Benington's arresting image entitled 'Among the Housetops' exhibited in 1893 shows the dome of St. Paul's Cathedral rising above London's buildings like a benign spirit. This image led to him joining the Linked Ring group of English photographers. In so doing he joined an elite group of contemporary photographers which was later to include Alfred Stieglitz. Crow states in his thesis [Abstract p. i], "[Benington] was a photographer of great distinction and marked individuality fully worthy of a major reappraisal."

Benington continued to use the landscape as his subject, for example, another view of St. Paul's taken in 1897 appeared in the 16 June 1908 edition of 'Amateur Photographer'. The image is of a busy Fleet Street looking east, the Cathedral bathed in light in contrast to the benighted buildings in the foreground. However, by 1910 Benington had become one of the leading portrait photographers in the country. His clientele included Sir Arthur Conan Doyle. As well as portraiture Benington made contributions to The Sphere Newspaper and other periodicals. A collection of Benington's images, all portraits, taken between 1914 and 1926, are held in the Bodleian Library, Oxford.

From 1927 he worked as a freelance portrait photographer for Elliott & Fry. His sitters included John Logie Baird, Albert Einstein and John Maynard Keynes.

Benington's images were exhibited at the London Salon Exhibition in Pall Mall in 1928, the London Correspondent of The Guardian noting the "impressiveness" of the portraits.

In 2007 The National Portrait Gallery held an exhibition 'Walter Benington: Pictorial Portraits'. The display celebrated his portrait photographs some of which were newly acquired by the Gallery and were being shown for the first time. The exhibition featured images of leading artistic, literary, political and scientific figures. The National Portrait Gallery collection includes 66 images taken by Benington.

Images attributed to Benington are in the collection of mainly architectural photographs in the Conway Library at the Courtauld Institute of Art.
