= Frederick H. Evans =

British photographer (1853–1943)

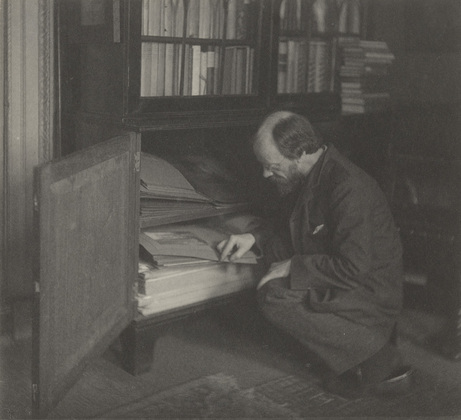
Frederick H. Evans, photo by Gertrude Käsebier

Frederick H. Evans (26 June 1853 – 24 June 1943) was an English photographer, best known for his images of architectural subjects, such as English and French cathedrals.

Evans was born and died in London. He began his career as a bookseller, but retired from that to become a full-time photographer in 1898, when he adopted the platinotype technique for his photography. Platinotype images, with extensive and subtle tonal range, non glossy-images, and better resistance to deterioration than other methods available at the time, suited Evans' subject matter. Almost as soon as he began, however, the cost of platinum - and consequently, the cost of platinum paper for his images - began to rise. Because of this cost, and because he was reluctant to adopt alternate methodologies, by 1915 Evans retired from photography altogether.

Evans' ideal of straightforward, "perfect" photographic rendering - unretouched or modified in any way - as an ideal was well-suited to the architectural foci of his work: the ancient, historic, ornate and often quite large cathedrals, cloisters and other buildings of the English and French countryside. This perfectionism, along with his tendency to exhibit and write about his work frequently, earned for him international respect and much imitation. He ultimately became regarded as perhaps the finest architectural photographer of his, or any, era - though some professionals privately felt that the Evans' philosophy favoring extremely literal images was restrictive of the creative expression rapidly becoming available within the growing technology of the photographic field.

Evans was also an able photographer of landscapes and portraits, and among the many notable friends and acquaintances he photographed was George Bernard Shaw, with whom he also often corresponded. Evans was made an honorary fellow of the Royal Photographic Society in 1928, he was also a member of the Linked Ring photographic society.

== Gallery ==
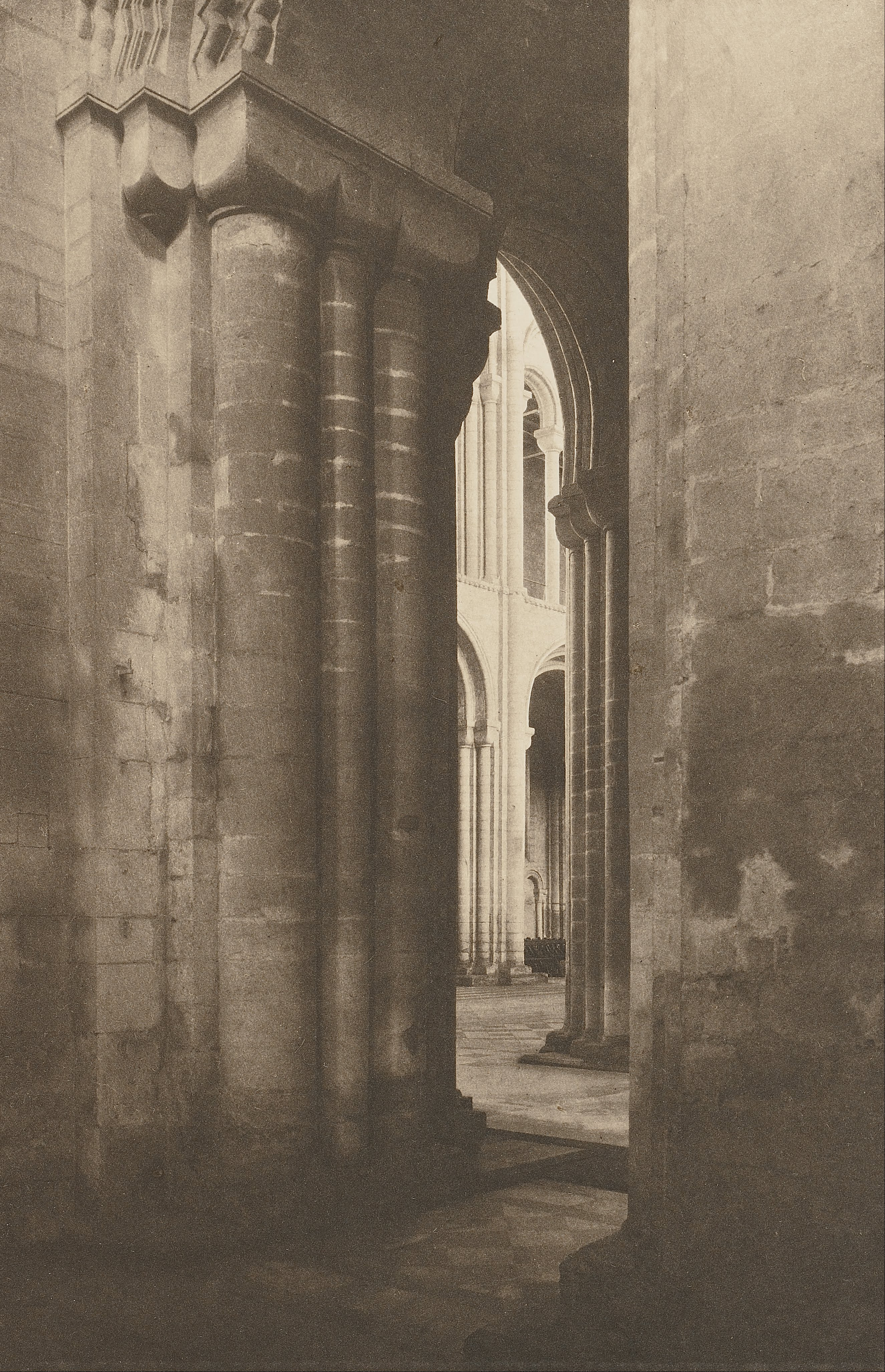
A Memory of the Normans (1903)

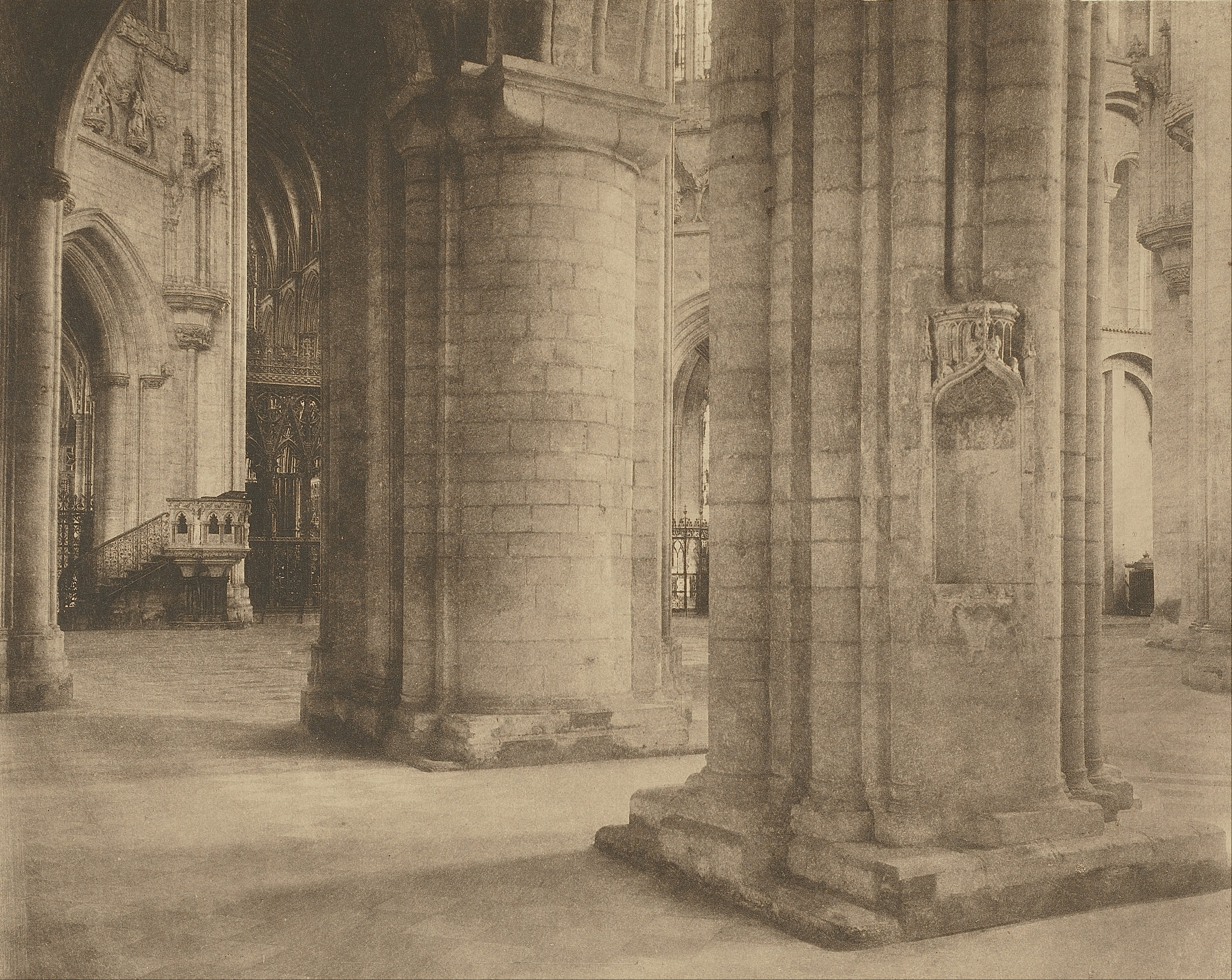
Across Nave and Octagon (1903)

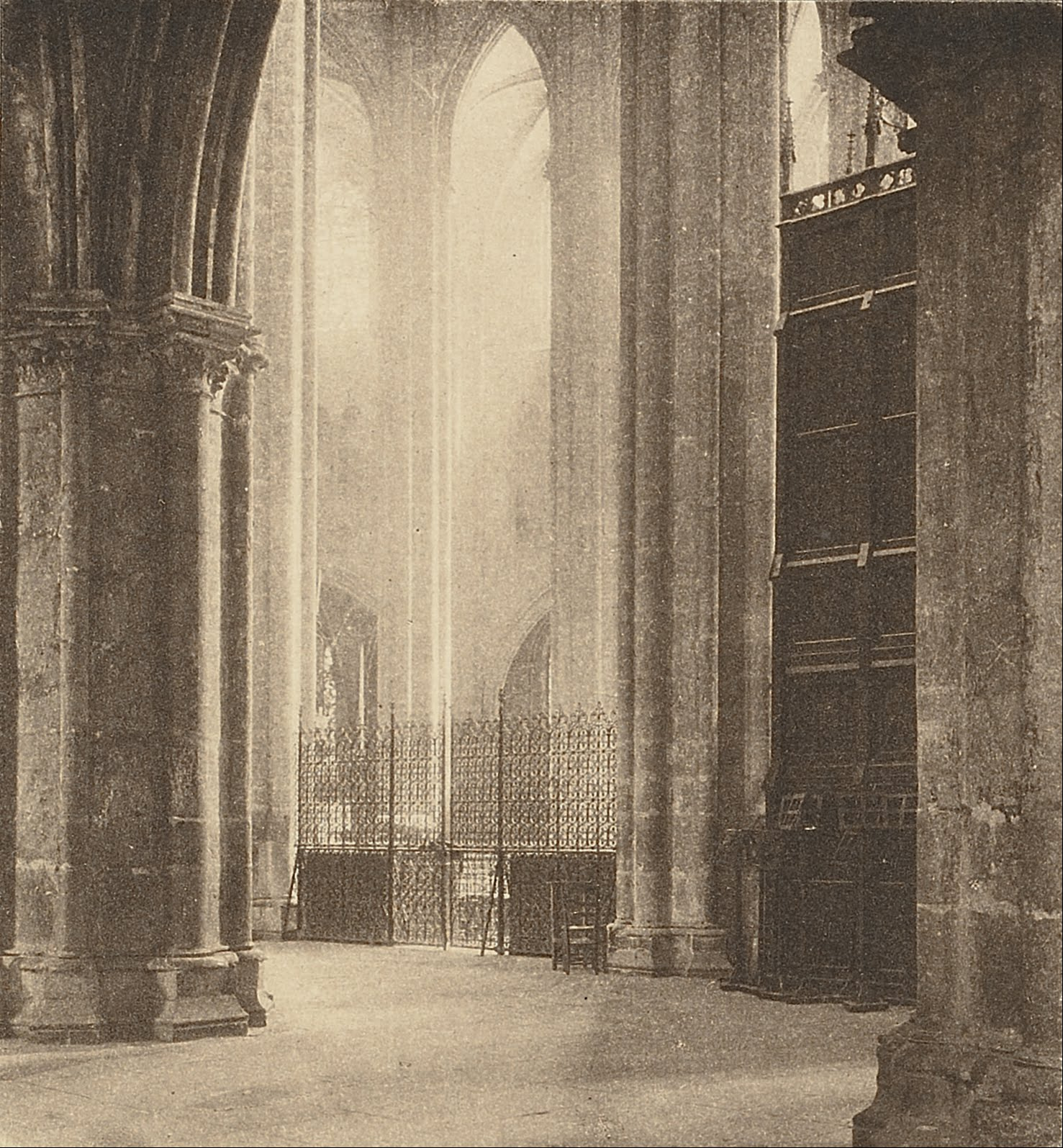
Height and Light in Bourges Cathedral (1903)

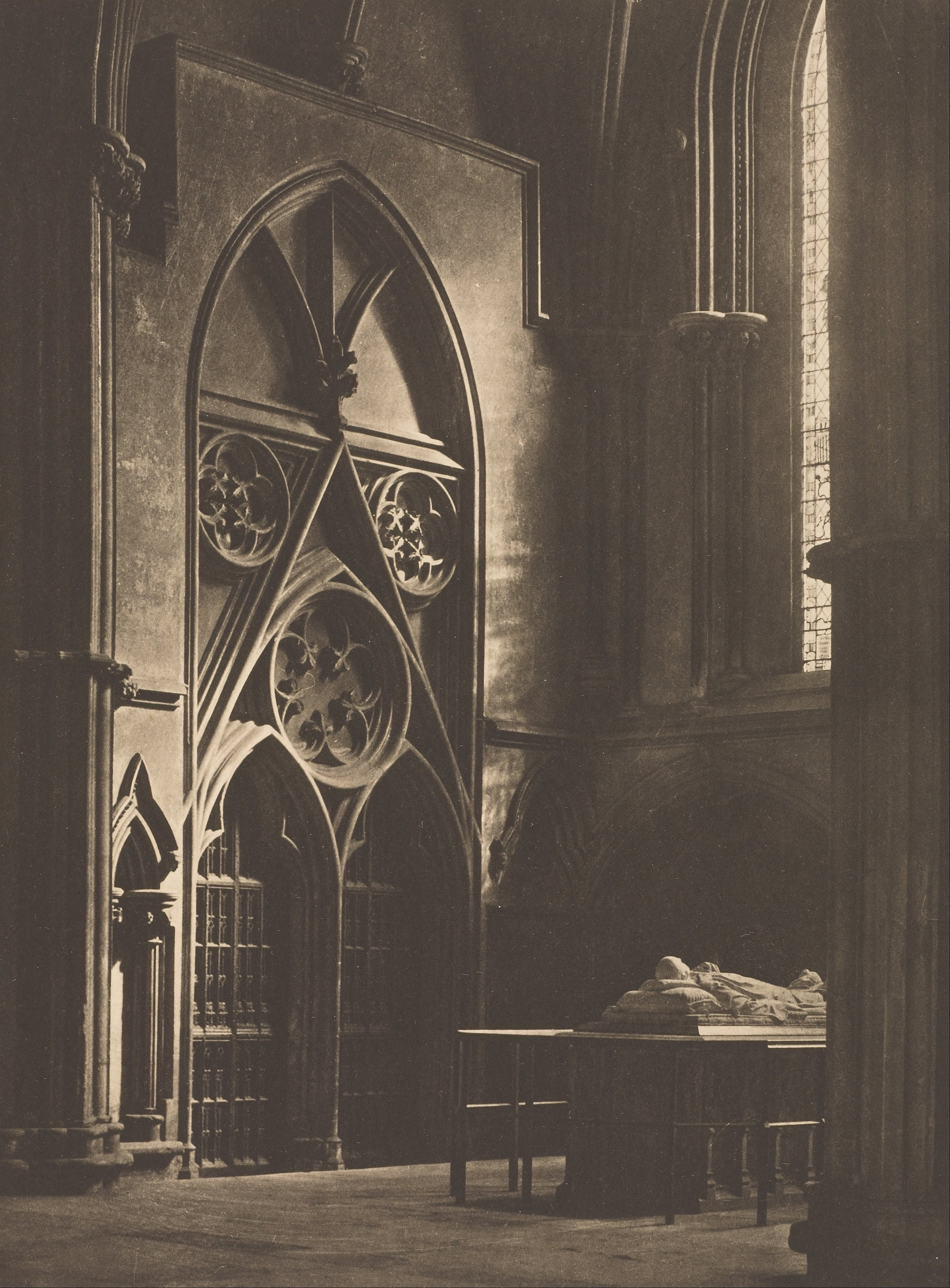
In Sure and Certain Hope (1904)

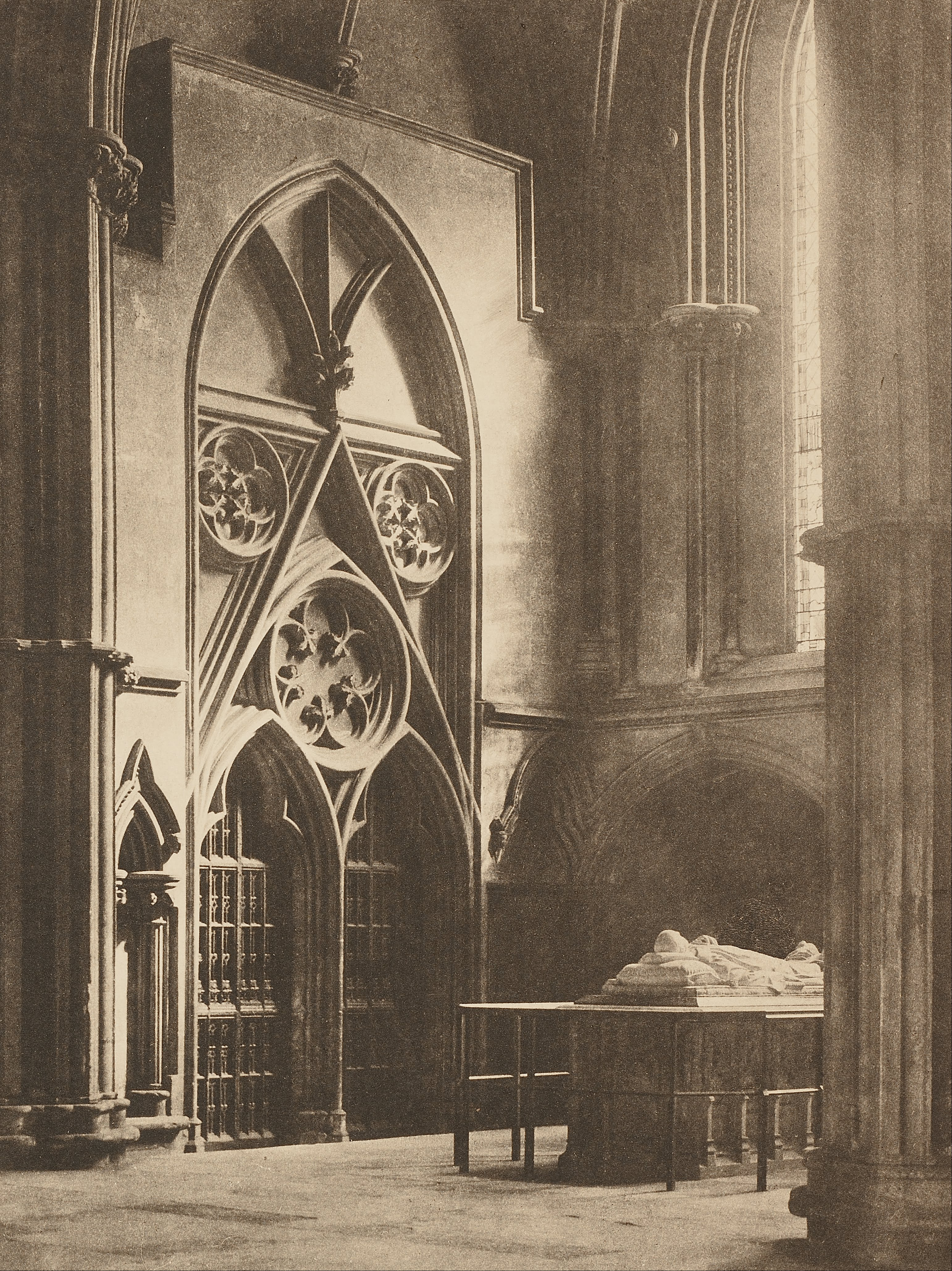
In Sure and Certain Hope (1903)

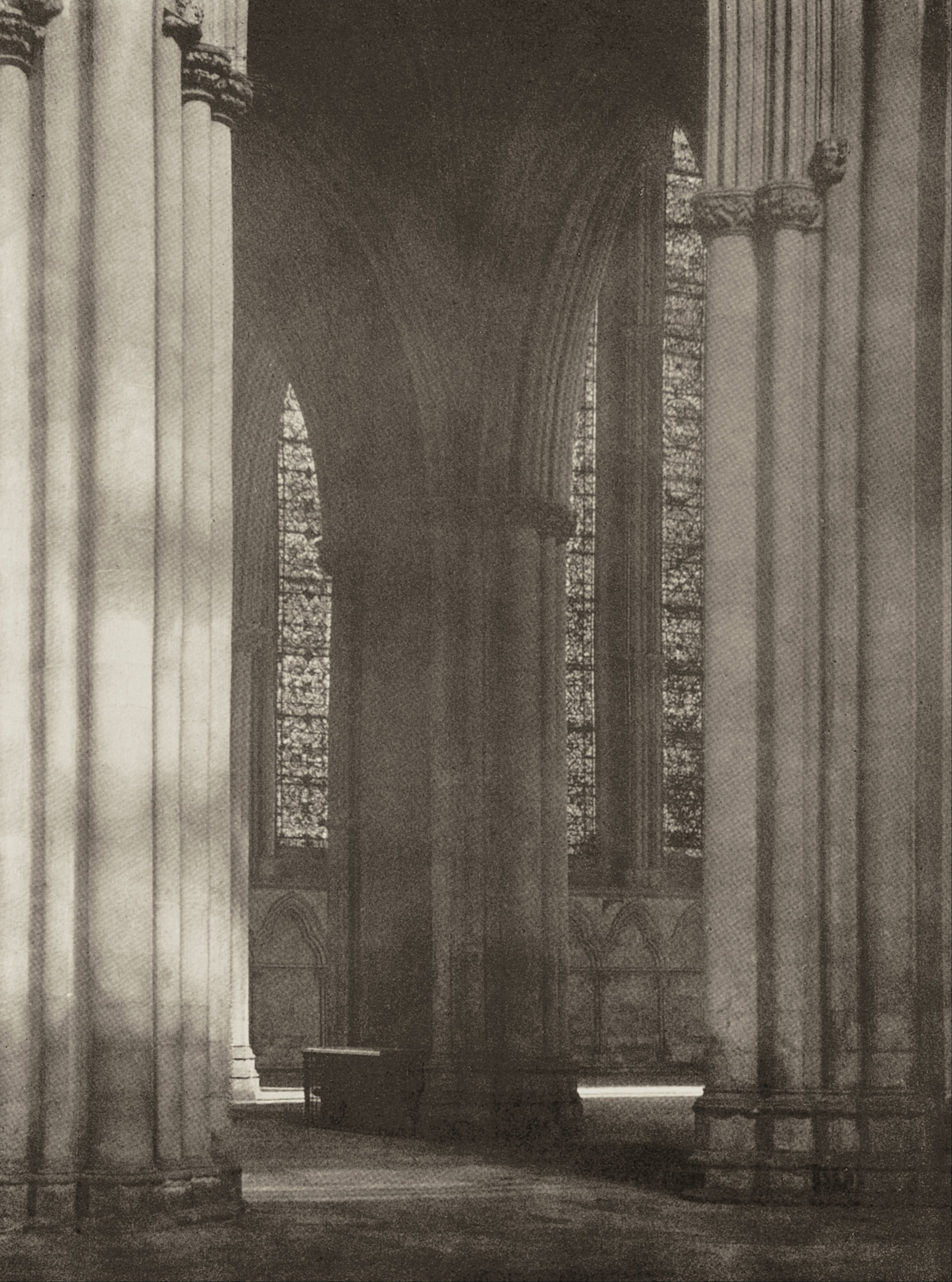
Into the North Transept (1903)
