= James Booker Blakemore Wellington =

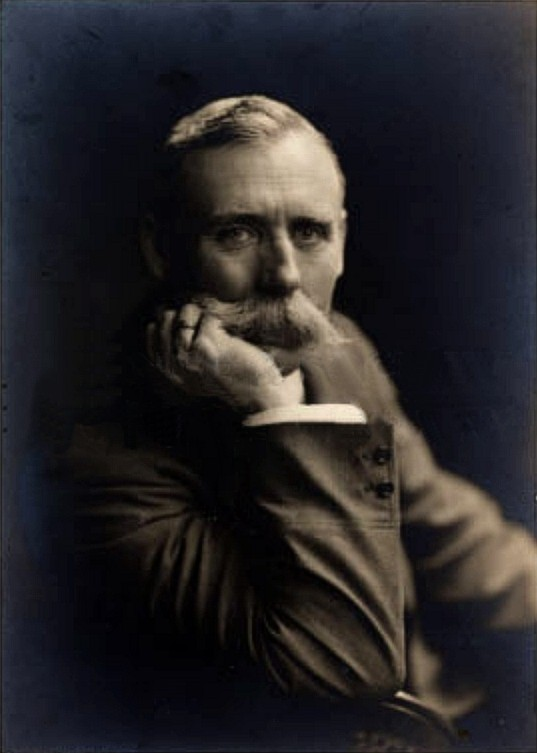
J. B. B. Wellington, in the early 1900s

James Booker Blakemore Wellington (1858 Lansdown – 1939 Elstree) was an English photographer.

Wellington originally trained as an architectural draughtsman. In the 1880s, however, an association with George Eastman in New York, drew him into the world of photography. Wellington was regarded as a pictorial photographer of note, while his work was clearly inspired by the paintings of John Constable and Thomas Gainsborough. He was invited to be a member of the Linked Ring Brotherhood in 1892, and was a regular judge on the selection and hanging committee of exhibitions held by the Photographic Society of Great Britain. He was a frequent exhibitor at the Royal Photographic Society.

Back in England he became a manager of Kodak's factory in Wealdstone and was responsible for a number of practical formulas for improving emulsions and developers, one being a negative intensifier containing silver nitrate, ammonium thiocyanate and sodium thiosulphate, and another being dry-collodion plates with improved sensitivity. Around 1895 he and his brother-in-law H. H. Ward set up a photographic paper manufacturing company, Wellington & Ward. The firm later extended into plates and film manufacture. In July 1922 the company acquired Leto Photo Materials (1905) Ltd, and in 1929 was taken over by Ilford Ltd. Before this Wellington had worked for Elliott & Fry of Chipping Barnet.

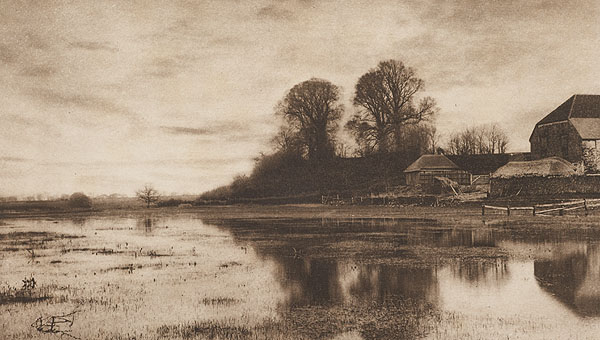
Eventide (1890) a photogravure

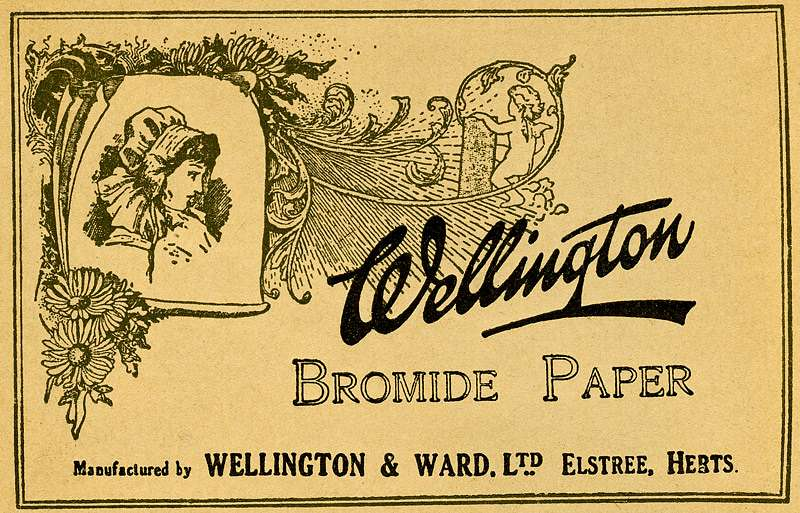
Packaging label for "Wellington & Ward" Bromide Paper (c.1895)

A collection of medals and photographs belonging to a grandniece of Wellington. was featured on BBC1's Antiques Roadshow programme on 20 February 2011.
