= Anna Ben-Yusuf =

Milliner and Fashion designer

- Born: Anna Kind c. 1845; Berlin, Kingdom of Prussia
- Died: 8 December 1909; New York City, US
- Occupations: Milliner and fashion designer
- Notable work: The Art of Millinery
- Children: Zaida Ben-Yusuf

Madame Anna Ben-Yusuf was a German milliner and teacher based in Boston and New York City. She wrote The Art of Millinery (1909), one of the first reference books on millinery technique. She was the mother of the portrait photographer Zaida Ben-Yusuf.

== Early life ==
Born Anna Kind in Berlin in around 1845, she married an Algerian man, Mustapha Moussa Ben Youseph Nathan, who lived in Hammersmith, London. They had four daughters - Esther Zeghdda Ben Youseph Nathan, better known as Zaida (1869-1933), Heidi (c.1873-1915), Leila (c.1877-1967) and Pearl (c.1878-1940), before the marriage fell apart. Anna and her daughters moved to Ramsgate, England, where she supported her family by working as a governess. Her ex-husband remained in London, occasionally giving lectures on Arab culture for the Moslem Mission Society. In 1891, he and his second wife Henrietta Crane, had a daughter, also called Zaida (1891-1967) and a son, Mussa, who died in infancy in 1893.

== Career ==
During the late 1880s, Anna Ben-Yusuf emigrated to the United States, where by 1891, she had established a milliner's shop on Washington Street in Boston. Her eldest daughter Zaida also emigrated to the US in 1895, setting up a milliner's at 251 Fifth Avenue, New York City before becoming a successful portrait photographer. Zaida published occasional articles on millinery for Harpers Bazaar and the Ladies Home Journal.

From September 1905 to June 1907, Anna Ben-Yusuf was an instructor in millinery at the Pratt Institute in Brooklyn, New York. She resigned in 1907 to set up a school of her own on West 23rd Street.

Her book, The Art of Millinery: Practical Lessons for the Artiste and the Amateur was published in 1909. It was one of the first reference books for teaching the art of hat-making in all its aspects, and remains a useful resource for leading contemporary milliners such as Stephen Jones. It was formatted as a series of lessons, each dealing with a particular aspect of constructing a hat, treating the fabric, or creating different types of trimming. On a more practical note, it also advised on correct storage, renovating fabrics, and the business side of millinery, and included a glossary of terms used in millinery. In 1992, a revised edition was reprinted as Edwardian Hats: The Art of Millinery.

== Books ==
- 1909 — The Art of Millinery
- 1992 — Edwardian Hats: The Art of Millinery

== Death ==
Anna Ben-Yusuf died in New York on 8 December 1909.
