= Lyddell Sawyer =

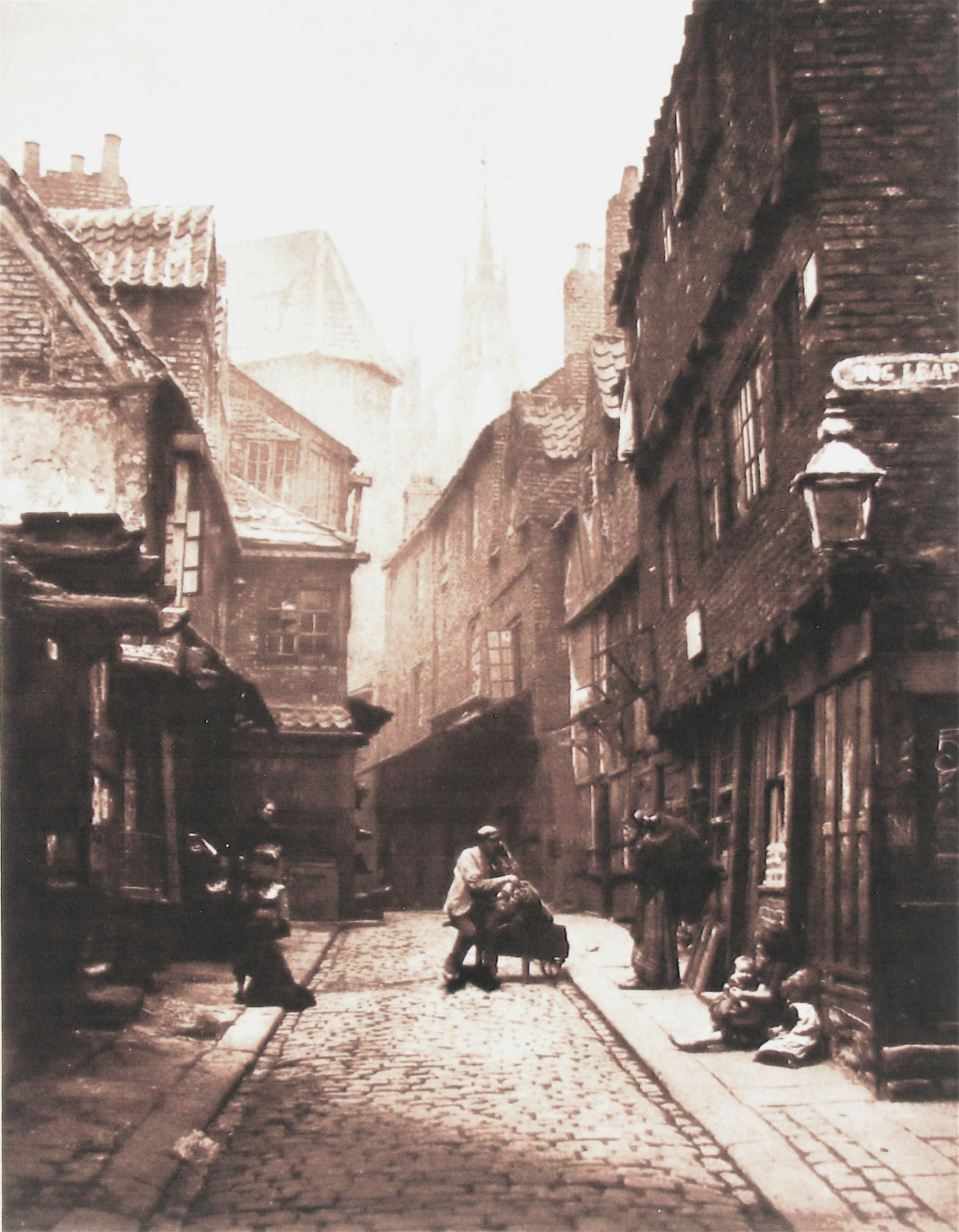
The castle Garth

Lyddell "Lyd" Sawyer (1856–1927) was a British photographer and founding member of The Linked Ring group of photographers. Although he showed almost 100 prints at what was later to become the Royal Photographic Society, only a handful of his images are well known.

Sawyer was born in North Shields on the River Tyne, and later moved to London. His early life in Tyneside had a lasting effect on his work, his Geordie roots shaping many of his photographs. Works such as The Apple Stealers Dividing the Spoils, Nutting Time, and Come Along Grandad offer evidence that his life was not one of affluence, in contrast to many of his southern contemporary photographers.

Of the English members of the 'Linked Ring' Sawyer is probably the least well known. The main reason for this is very few of his photographs have survived, there are the four that were published in 'Sun Artists' in 1893 that was dedicated to him, along with such important figures in the history of photography as Julia Margaret Cameron and H.P. Robinson.

Sawyer also formed a limited company with several branches including Regent Street, London as well as Sunderland and Newcastle upon Tyne in his native north east. In 1901 Lyddell Sawyer left The Linked Ring and continued operating a studio in Maida Vale until at least 1908.
