= The Linked Ring =

Association of English photographers

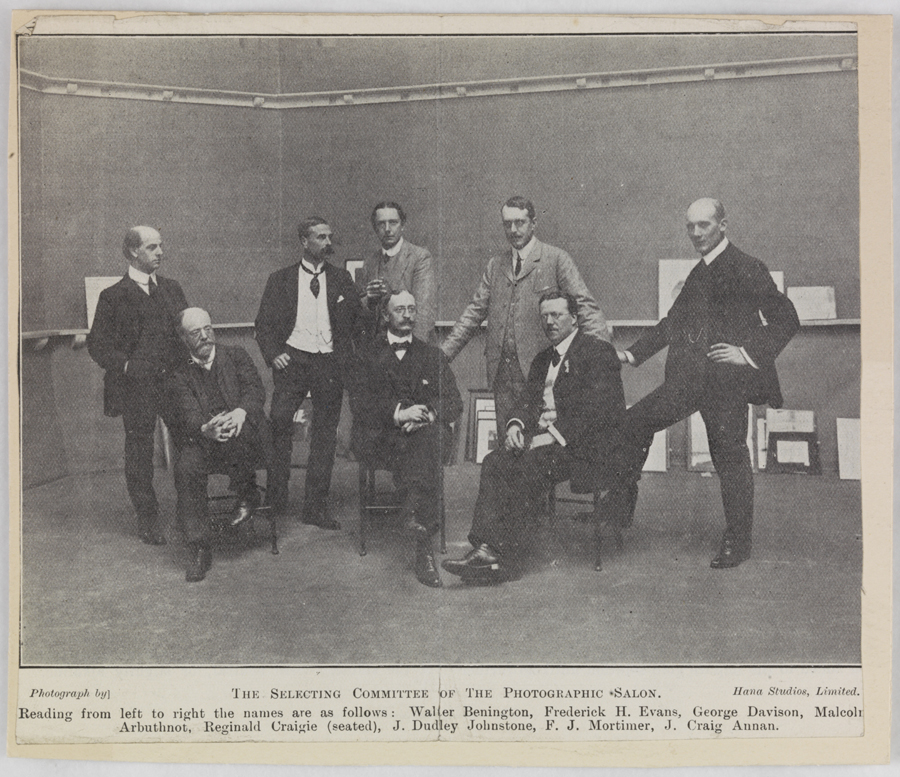
The Selecting Committee of the Photographic Salon of the Linked Ring

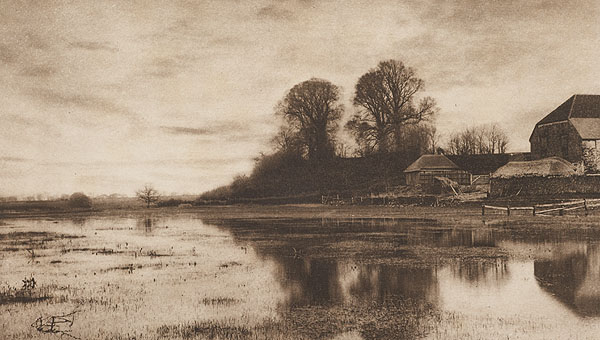
'Eventide' by J.B.B. Wellington

The Linked Ring (also known as "The Brotherhood of the Linked Ring") was a British photographic society created to propose and defend photography as being just as much an art as it was a science. Members dedicated to the craft looked for new techniques that would cause the less knowledgeable to steer away, persuading photographers and enthusiasts to experiment with chemical processes, printing techniques and new styles.

== Motivation to create the Linked Ring ==
Photography was interpreted in two ways: art photography and science photography. The science of photography requires practice that determines the outcome of the image, whereas the art aspect of photography concerns itself with the aesthetic experience and success of the photograph to the viewer. These differences created a tension in the craft that the Linked Ring sought to change.

The group was founded in May 1892 by Henry Peach Robinson, former Photographic Society of Great Britain member George Davison, and Henry Van der Weyde. The Brotherhood was "a means of bringing together those who are interested in the development of the highest form of Art of which Photography is capable." Membership of the group was by invitation only; other members included James Craig Annan, Walter Benington, Arthur Burchett, Alvin Langdon Coburn, Frederick H. Evans, Alfred Horsley Hinton, Frederick Hollyer, Harold Moritmer Lamb, Richard Keene, Alexander Keighley, Paul Martin, Alfred Maskell, Lydell Sawyer (aka Lyd Sawyer), William Smedley-Aston, Frank Sutcliffe, J. B. B. Wellington, and, later, Americans Rudolf Eickemeyer, Jr., Clarence H. White and Alfred Stieglitz. Robinson's son, Ralph Winwood Robinson, was also a member.

Although works by female photographers such as those by Zaida Ben-Yusuf were exhibited at the annual shows during the 1890s, it was not until 1900 that Gertrude Käsebier became one of the first elected female members of the Ring.

== Linked Ring successes ==
In November 1893, Robinson created the Photographic Salon, an annual exhibit event in England whose aim was to "exhibit [images] that are description of pictorial photography in which there is distinct evidence of personal feeling and execution." As a result, interest grew in processes such as gum bi-chromate, oil pigment and transfer, and supported the trend in producing images not for reproduction, but works of high value, as well as creating interest in surface texture, papers, and colour of print.

In 1896 they began publishing The Linked Ring Papers, which were circulated annually to members until 1909 to promote and discuss the aesthetics and practice of pictorialism.

== Photo-Secession—the American counterpart of the Linked Ring ==
The Photo-Secession was founded by photographer Alfred Stieglitz in 1902. Stieglitz wanted to show that photography had artistic expression similar to that of painting and sculpture, emphasizing further the craftsmanship abilities of photographers. Photo-Secession members were also called American Links, and displayed works in the Little Galleries of the Photo-Secession at Fifth Avenue, New York City. Members include Mary Devens, Frank Eugene, Gertrude Käsebier, William B. Dyer, Eva Watson-Schütze, Edward Steichen, Edmund Stirling, and Clarence H. White.

== Prominent members and contributions ==
Pictorialist James Craig Annan was born into a household at the forefront of photography technology. In 1866 his father created a four-foot print of an eleven-foot painting with the new process of carbon printing. This became Annan's primary influence to become a skilled photographer himself. At a young age, he learned the process of photogravure in Vienna on a trip with his father. This process allowed Annan to work like an etcher—sharpening, shading, or blurring areas of the picture, describing this process as "a long drawn out pleasure".

Frederick H. Evans was responsible for leading the Linked Ring's photography magazines, writing publications for the newspaper, and installations at Photo Salon. One of the most gifted and sensitive of "the Links", Evans is known for his images of architecture, specifically cathedrals. He is known to have spent weeks living in the cathedrals he photographed waiting for ideal lighting conditions to reveal the poetry in his subjects.

Frank S. Sutcliffe was most well known for his image "Water Rats", exemplary of being one of the first images showing depth of field accomplished in camera.

The Brotherhood represented themselves with a logo of three interlinked rings, which were meant in part to represent the Masonic beliefs of Good, True, and Beautiful.
