= George Davison (photographer) =

1908 photograph of Davison by Alvin Langdon Coburn

George Davison (19 September 1854 – 26 December 1930) was an English photographer, a proponent of impressionistic photography, a co-founder of the Linked Ring Brotherhood of British artists and a managing director of Kodak UK. He was also a millionaire, thanks to an early investment in Eastman Kodak.

== Biography ==
Even George Davison was born in Lowestoft, into the poor family of a shipyard carpenter. He received a good education, and gained employment as a civil servant at Somerset House, London in 1874.

He began to make photographs in 1885, and he joined the Camera Club photography society around that time. He took part in a Royal Photographic Society exhibition the next year, and became a member. He was influenced by naturalistic photographers in the early phase of his work, especially Peter Henry Emerson.

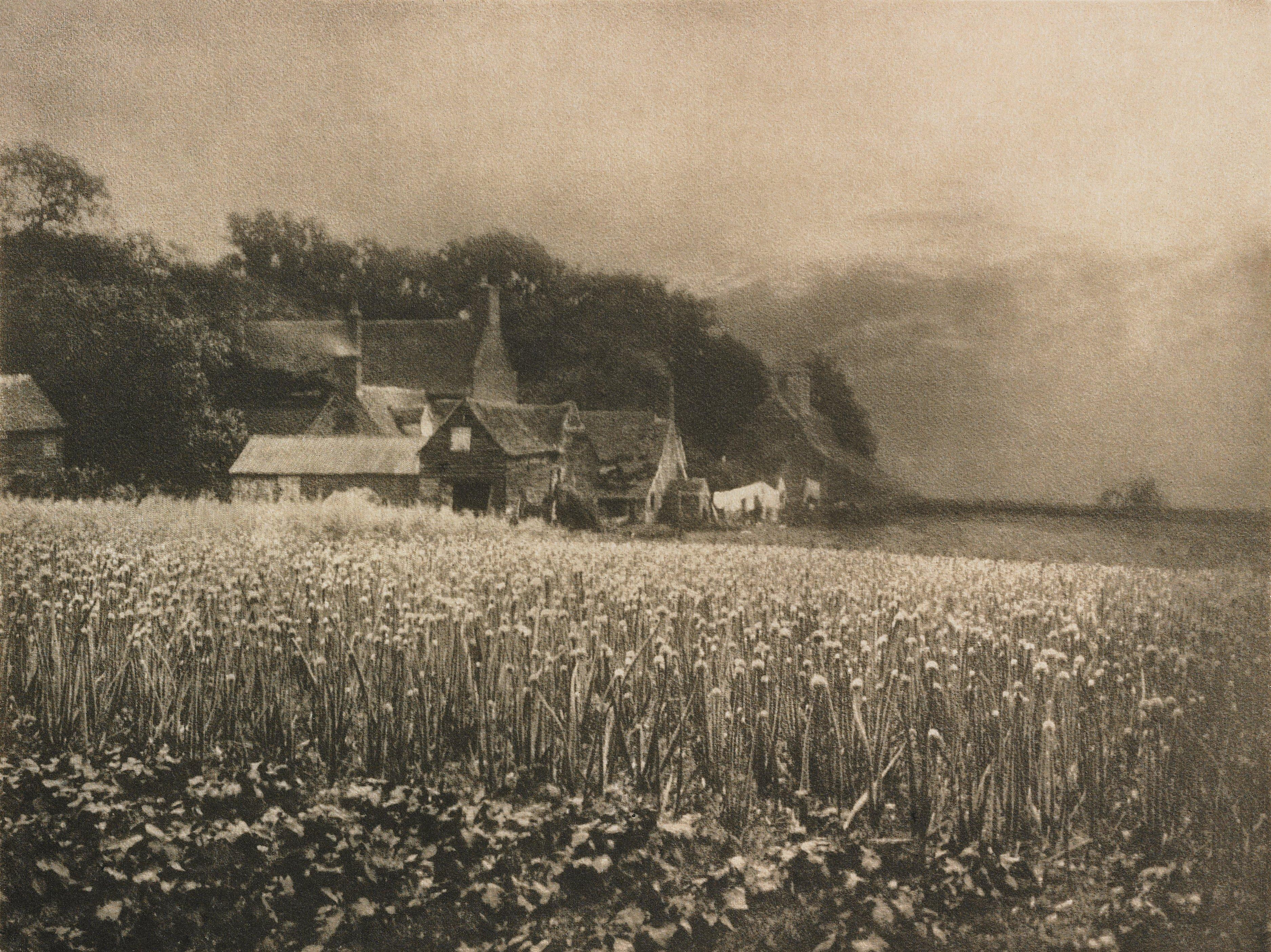
George Davison – The Onion Field (1890)

However, Davison experimented with techniques and processes, and soon turned away from naturalistic photography. He started to use a pinhole camera as one of the first pictorialistic photographers. He made a picture called The Onion Field (originally named An Old Farmstead) in 1890, without sharp outlines on a rough paper, giving the effect of painting. It is considered as the first impressionistic photograph. Nevertheless, Davison's photographs became a subject of polemics and controversy in the Royal Photographic Society. He decided to leave the society and to establish a new organisation, the Linked Ring Brotherhood, together with other followers in 1892.

George Eastman offered Davison a directorship of the Eastman Photographic Materials Company in London in 1889. It was the start of a long-term connection between Davison, Eastman and Kodak. He left his civil service position in 1897, and became an assistant manager in Eastman Photographic Materials. His first task was to organize a major competition and exhibition of amateur photography in London. The exhibition was successful, receiving more than 25,000 visitors during three weeks.

Davison became a deputy director of Kodak in 1898, and the director two years later. He took photographs and held exhibitions till 1911, even though he was busy working for the company.

Davison was interested in social reforms which linked him in contacts with anarchists. Therefore, Eastman asked him to resign his director position in 1908. Davison continued to be a member of board till 1912, when he left the Kodak company. He moved to Harlech, north Wales, and later, for health reasons, to Antibes, southern France, where he died in 1930.

He married twice, his second wife being Florence ("Joan") Anne Austin-Jones (c.1897–1955). Following his death, she married the photographer Malcolm Arbuthnot.

== Literature ==
- Harding, Colin (2008). "Davison, George (1854–1930)". In Hannavy, John (ed.). Encyclopedia of Nineteenth-century Photography. Vol. 1. London: CRC Press. ISBN 978-0-415-97235-2.
