= René Le Bègue (photographer) =

French photographer (1856–1914)

- Born: René Frédéric Alfred Le Bègue; 9 September 1856; Paris, France
- Died: 15 May 1914 (aged 57); Paris, France
- Resting place: Montparnasse Cemetery
- Occupation: Photographer
- Known for: Photography
- Movement: Pictorialism
- Father: Alfred Le Bègue
- Relatives: Paul Bergon (nephew)

René Le Bègue (9 September 1856 – 15 May 1914) was a French photographer and one of the leading figures of Pictorialism in France.

== Early life and education ==
René Frédéric Alfred Le Bègue was born in Paris, France, on 9 September 1856.

== Career ==
Beginning in 1880, René Le Bègue embraced a profession of photography, becoming a leading representative of French Pictorialism. Le Bègue was an early member of the Photo-club de Paris, a French photographic society.

Along with Constant Puyo, Robert Demachy, and Maurice Bucquet, he helped organize the Paris Photo-club's first exhibition of Photographic art (French: Exposition d'Art Photographique) held in January 1894. That year, he began to exhibit regularly at the exhibitions of the Photo-club de Paris. He submitted 14 pictures to the 1894 Paris exhibition.

Le Bègue was one of the first French members to be admitted into London's Brotherhood of the Linked Ring, a British photographic society. His work was accepted for the second annual Photographic Salon of the Linked Ring in 1894 at the Dudley Gallery in London. Four of his photographs were exhibited, with a price tag of 10 to 15 shillings each, except "Le Boquet," which was priced at one pound. He achieved notable acclaim at foreign exhibitions. In 1895, Le Bègue exhibited at the Photographic Society of London's 40th Annual Exhibition at The Gallery in Pall Mall, London. Joseph Gleeson White, the English writer, documented that Le Bégue sent various artworks of his posed and draped models, namely L' Attente, Fleurs d'Orient, Surprise, Etude en Plein Air, and Etude de Nu.

Le Bègue, engaging in photographic nude studies, became widely recognized for his expertise in photographing the human figure, whether it was unclothed or adorned. The Photogram described Le Bègue as a "lover of feminine gracefulness". In 1896, Douze petites études de Femmes, a series of twelve photogravures by Le Bègue, was published by the Journal des artistes based at 33 rue du Dragon in Paris. These images, carefully executed in photogravure, captured the distinct stages of his style's development.

In 1898, he exhibited his photographs at the 5th International Exhibition of Artistic Photography in Hamburg, in company with other representatives from the Paris Photo Club.

Le Bègue shared a studio with his nephew and French photographer Paul Bergon. In 1898, Le Bègue and Bergon published The Nude and the Draped in the open air (French: Le Nu et le Drapé en Plein Air). Written in French, the book detailed the methods for capturing the female figure, both nude and dressed, in outdoor settings.

He was featured in the third volume of Camera Notes, a photographic journal published in July 1899 by the Camera Club of New York. In the 1900s, his photographs were reproduced in American photographer Alfred Stieglitz's photographic journal Camera Work.

The Parisian photographer exhibited six photos at the 4th Philadelphia Photographic Salon organized by the Pennsylvania Academy of the Fine Arts and the Photographic Society of Philadelphia in 1901.

Le Bègue began employing the Gum bichromate process for his prints by 1902. In around 1904, he assembled about 50 studies of women for an exhibition at the Otto gallery on 15 rue Royale. He was featured in an exhibition of Gum Prints at Stieglitz's Little Galleries of the Photo-Secession in January 1906.

== Death ==
René Le Bègue died in 1914 in Paris, France.

== Works ==
- Fantaisie
- At the Margin of the Brook
- Bouquet de Grève
- Sea Breeze (from Douze petites études de Femmes)

== Gallery ==
Photos by René Le Bègue

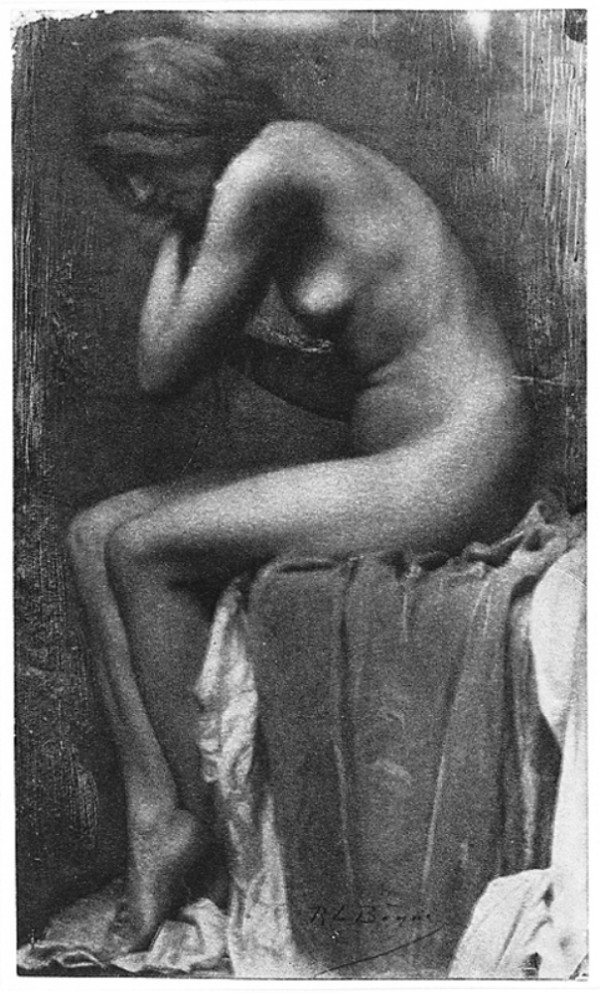
Académie (1902)

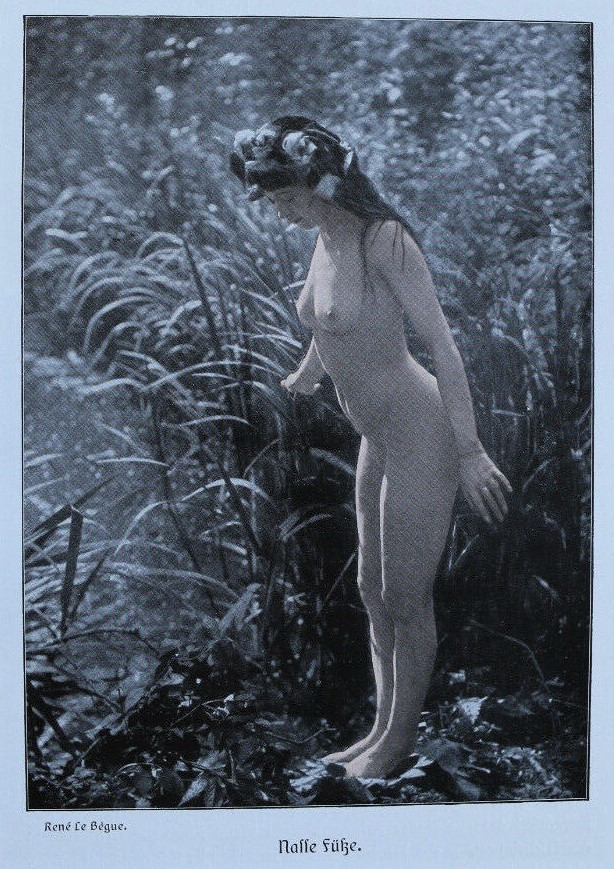
Nasse Füße (1905)

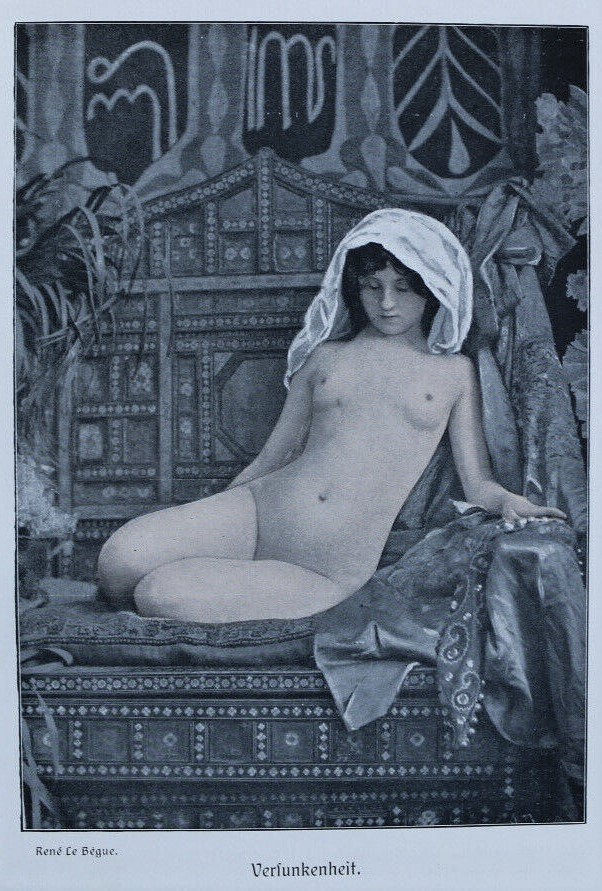
Versunkenheit (1905)

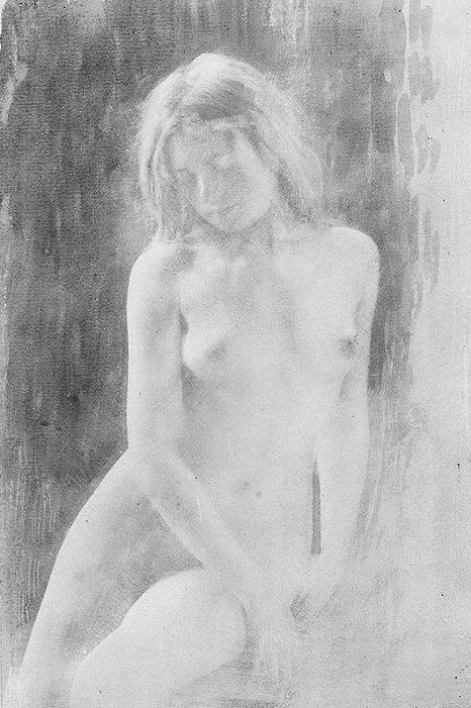
Etude de Nu (1904)

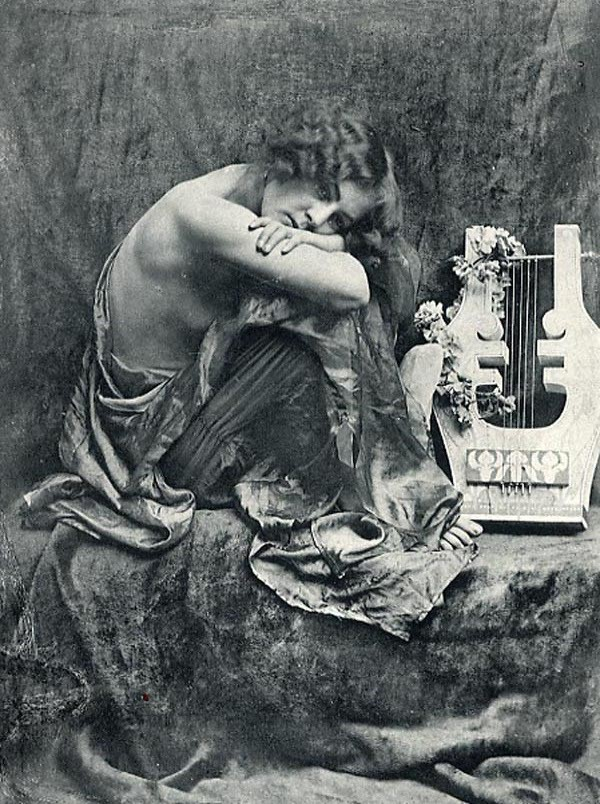
Méditation (1900)
