= Céline Laguarde =

French photographer (1873–1961)

- Born: Gracieuse Céline Laguarde de Camoux; November 2, 1873; Biarritz
- Died: 20 May 1961 (aged 87); Lausanne
- Citizenship: French

Gracieuse Céline Laguarde de Camoux (known as Céline Laguarde), (2 November 1873 – 20 May 1961), was a French photographer and a member of the Pictorialist movement, a movement of creating photographs as an art work rather than as a simple image of record.

== Early life ==
Gracieuse Céline Laguarde de Camoux, known as Céline Laguarde, was born in Biarritz on 2 November 1873, the daughter of a Biarritz landowner, she remained very close to her native Basque Country.

Laguarde lived in Paris from 1880 to 1890, before moving to Aix-en-Provence. She was part of Aix-en-Provence society and held salons there, organising and taking part in musical and literary events. In an article Chronique aixoise in the Marseilles publication La Vedette, published on 19 March 1898, she wrote ‘We applauded successively and no less warmly La Marche à l'étoile and L'Enfant prodigue from Frazerolle's score; the charming organ of Mlle Laguarde improvised as conductor, the supple, vibrant voice of an improvised mezzo-soprano'.

== Photographic career ==
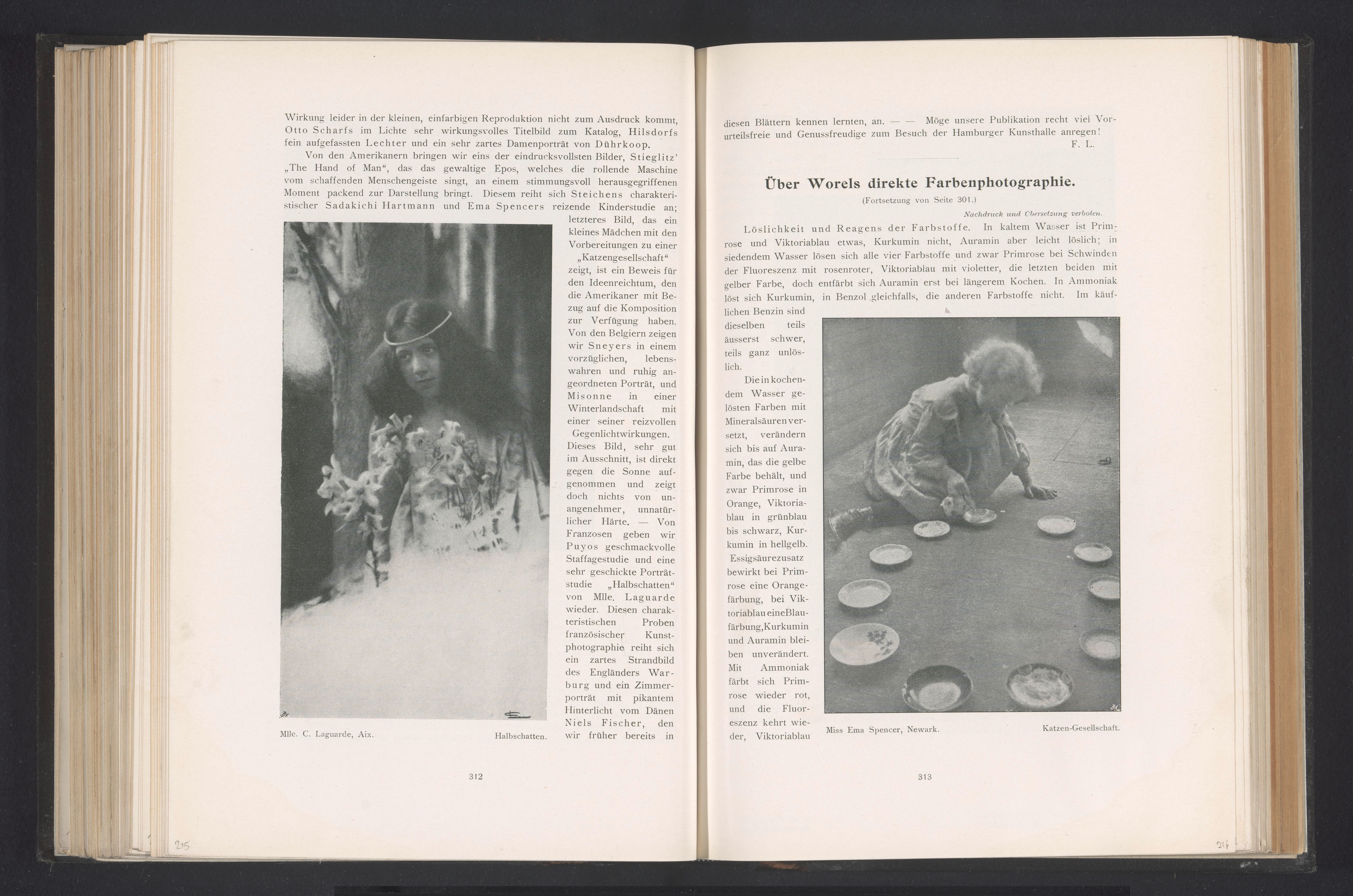
Portrait of an unknown girl with flowers (left)

Laguarde's first prints date from the final years of the nineteenth century. Her first work, entitled Une précieuse, was published in the magazine Art et Photographie in 1900. The following year, another print, L'Automne, was reproduced in the same magazine. She developed a passion for photography as part of the Pictorialist movement. Laguarde soon became a pupil of Robert Demachy, with whom she shared a mastery of the gomme bichromatée technique of making photographic prints without using silver halides.

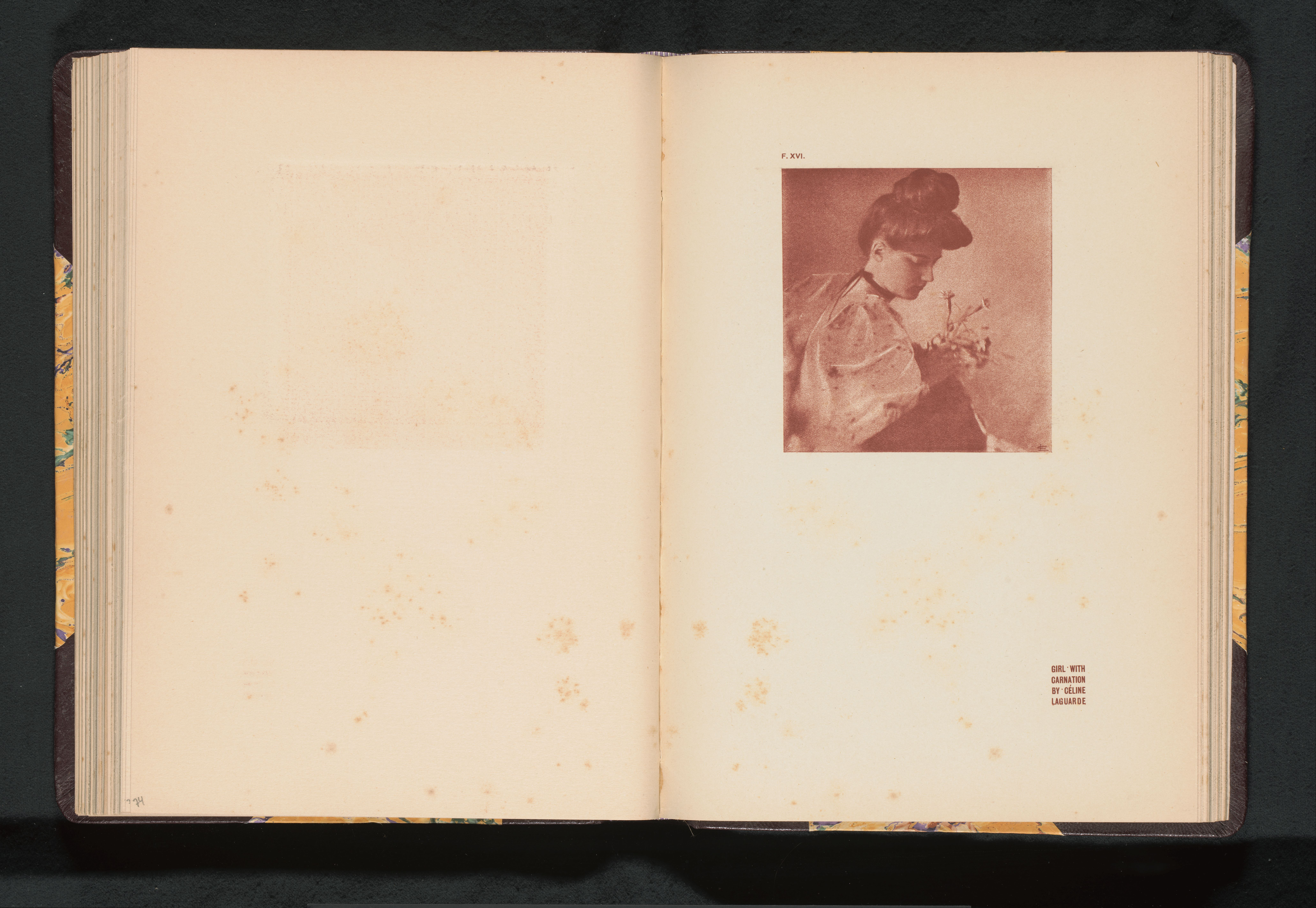
Girl with carnation

Initially photographing her immediate family and close friends, Laguarde soon began photographing local personalities from the intellectual milieu of Provence, in which circles she moved in. Many of her salon guests were pressed into service as photographic models shortly afterwards. She first became a member of the Marseilles Photo-club. In 1901 her work was accepted for display at the Salon du Photo-club de Paris, the annual exhibition organised by the leading French photographic association. She became a corresponding member of the Paris Photo-club in 1902.

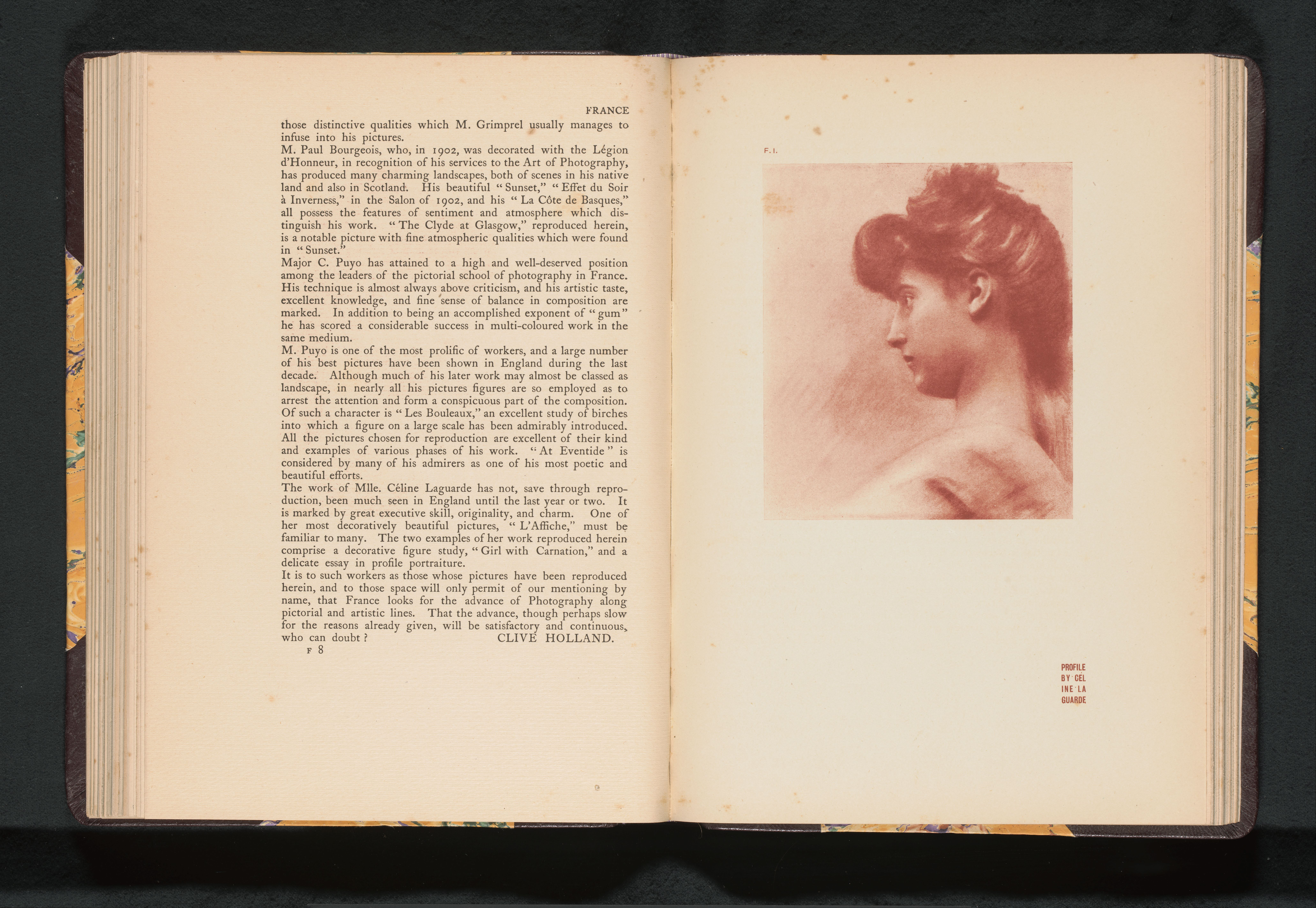
Profile

Laguarde's works Stella, Étude en brun, Pierrette were printed alongside those of Constant Puyo, Robert Demachy and Maurice Bucquet, the greatest names in pictorialism, in the prestigious edition of L'Épreuve photographique. It was presented in intaglio printing, and published in two series in 1904 and 1905 by Plon, under the direction of Roger Aubry. The only woman to appear in the index of this publication, Laguarde can be considered the only female authority on the movement.

Laguarde's work was published several times in specialist photographic magazines, both in France and internationally as well as in photography books. She took part in several exhibitions organised by photography clubs, including those in Marseille (1903 and 1904) and Paris. From 6 to 15 April 1911, the Photo-club de Nice organised an exhibition entirely devoted to her, in the Casino Municipal where she displayed almost 70 works.

Her work as a pictorialist can be divided into two periods: from the end of the nineteenth century until 1909, and from 1909 to 1914. Michel Poivert noted that ‘until 1909, critics recognised her as a mystical iconographer open to symbolic influences, whereafter she then devoted herself to portraits’. She created portraits of famous people: Maurice Ravel, Darius Milhaud, Francis Jammes, Maurice Barrès, Frédéric Mistral and Jules Chéret.

On 28 January 1907, the minister of public education and fine arts issued a decree awarding her the title of Ordre des Palmes académiques as a painter in Paris. The magazine of the Société de photographie de Marseille published their congratulations.

== Later life ==
On 25 November 1913, Céline Laguarde married Swiss doctor Édouard Frédéric Bugnion(fr.) (1845–1939) in Aix-en-Provence. Her photographic activity seems to have diminished after the First World War, although she did support her entomologist husband's scientific work with microphotographs taken at their villa La Luciole, near Aix. After her husband's death in Aix-en-Provence, she divided her time between France and Switzerland.

Gracieuse Céline Laguarde de Camoux died in 1961. She had been a benefactress of the Abbey of Saint-Maurice d'Agaune in Switzerland, financing the building of the new organ, and she was buried there after a funeral service in the basilica.

== Awards ==
- Officier d'Académie (1907)

== Legacy ==
Several of Legarde's images were exhibited and reproduced in the exhibition catalogue as part of the exhibition Qui a peur des femmes photographes? organised by the Musée d'Orsay in 2015 - 2016, leading to a wider rediscovery of her work. These included portraits of Jean-Henri Fabre and Maurice Barrès, as well as Sorcière, La Robe de gaze and two other portraits.

In 2017, the Musée d'Orsay acquired a large collection of works by Laguarde and undertook new research into her work. As a result, the Musée d'Orsay is shown Céline Laguarde (1873-1961) Photographe an exhibition devoted to 140 of her works, from 24 September 2024 to 12 January 2025.

The Metropolitan Museum in New York holds her work Un Bibliothécaire (1900–1909).

== Bibliography ==
- Alfred Maskell and Robert Demachy, Le Procédé à la gomme bichromatée, ou Photo-aquateinte, translated from English by G. Devanlay, Gauthier-Villars et fils, Paris, first published in 1898; reprinted in 1987.
- Robert Demachy and Constant Puyo, in Les Procédés d'art en photographie, Photo-club de Paris, 1906, including a print of Fantaisie Louis XV by Céline Laguarde.
- Thomas Galifot and Marie Robert (eds.), Qui a peur des femmes photographes? : 1839-1945, Paris, Musée d'Orsay / Hazan, 2015, ISBN 978-2-35433-165-8.
