= Pierre Dubreuil =

French photographer

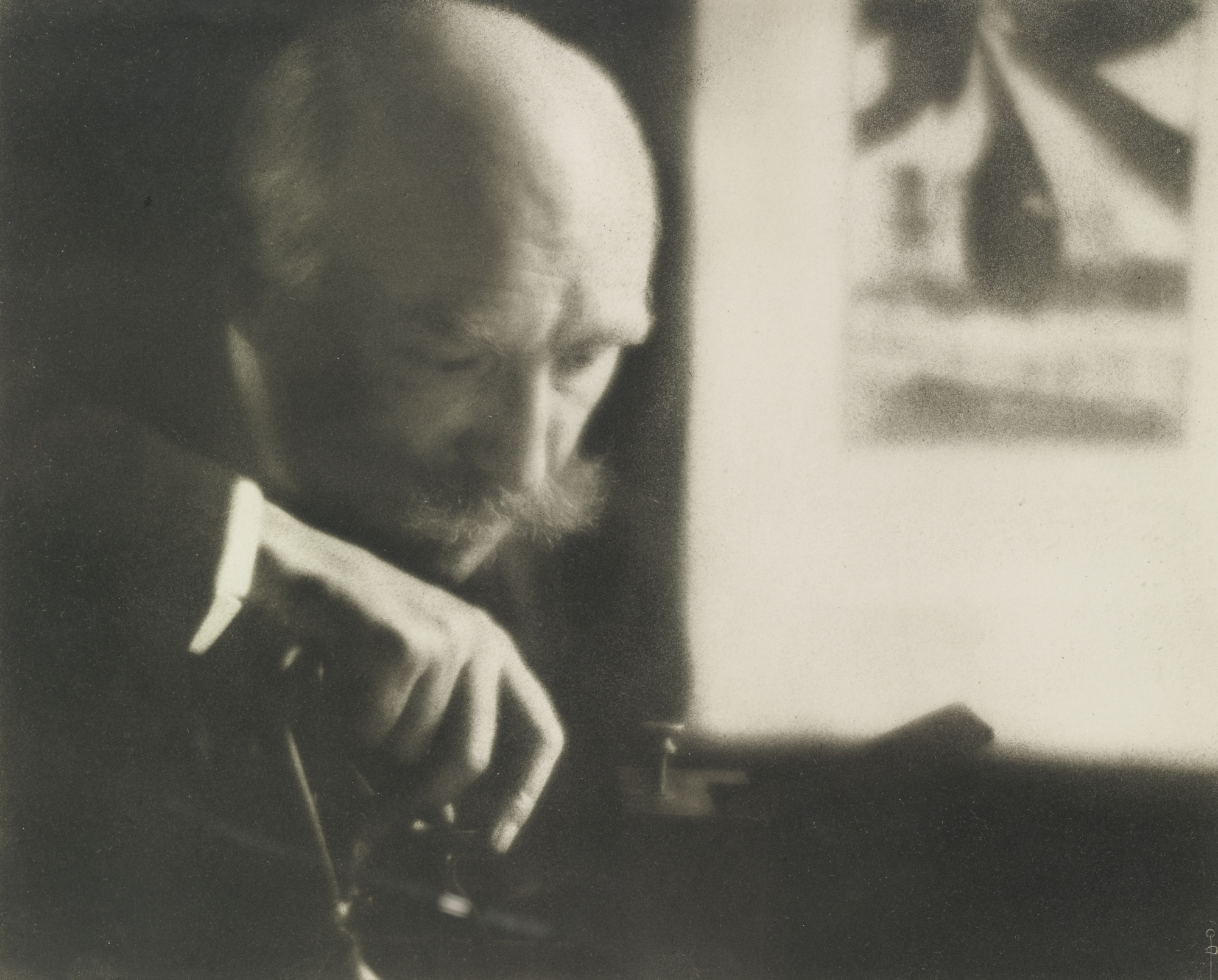
Self-portrait of Dubreuil circa 1909

Pierre Dubreuil (March 5, 1872 – January 9, 1944) was a French photographer, born in Lille, who spent his career in France and Belgium. As a pioneer of modernist photography, Dubreuil embraced innovative techniques and ideas that were celebrated, criticized, and at times, overlooked. Over the course of his career, which was interrupted by both World Wars, Dubreuil's work was shown at the Photo-club de Paris, the Albright Gallery exhibition in Buffalo, New York, the Little Gallery of the Amateur Photography Magazine in London, and the Royal Photographic Society. In 1988, more than forty years after Dubreuil's death, photographer and collector Tom Jacobson revived interest in his work, seeking out long-forgotten and displaced works that culminated in an exhibition at the Musée d'Art Moderne, Centre Georges Pompidou in Paris (October 28, 1987 – January 5, 1988).

== Life and career ==
=== Early life ===
Pierre Dubreuil was born in a wealthy family, well established in the wallpaper trade. In 1888 he joined the Jesuit College of Saint-Joseph in Lille and started to take pictures with a half-plate camera aged sixteen. After serving for three years in the Saint-Omer Dragoons he started working with the photographer Louis-Jean Delton, who was specializing in horse subjects. In 1891 Pierre Dubreuil became a member of the Lille Photographic Society. There he met Robert Pauli who initiated him to the carbon and platinum printing techniques.

=== Career ===
==== Early years (1896–1900) ====
Dubreuil's recognition first came in 1896, when his Sombre Clarté ("Dark Clarity") was shown in Brussels. Subsequently, Dubreuil exhibited five prints at the Photo-club de Paris, and by the turn of the century was internationally acclaimed, even upstaging Constant Puyo and Robert Demachy, the major figures of the Photo-club de Paris. By the turn of the century, 39 of Dubreuil's works were featured in Annuaire General et International de la Photographie, and German critic Fritz Loescher praised Dubreuil in Photographische Mitteilungen. Few of Dubreuil's works from this period survived; they may have been destroyed by the photographer himself, or destroyed in bombings during the Second World War.

==== Pre-war period (1900–1912) ====
In 1903 Dubreuil was admitted as a member to the Linked Ring Brotherhood in London. This put Dubreuil among the ranks of Alfred Stieglitz, Edward Steichen, F. Holland Day, Frederick H. Evans, and Gertrude Käsebier. In 1904 he began using the bromoil process, which he favored until 1930. This versatile process gave Dubreuil the freedom to control contrast and darken and lighten portions of prints at will. Dubreuil took this new printing process to Paris, where he was influenced by Cubism and Futurism; he became one of the first photographers to explore Modernism in the medium, preceding Alvin Langdon Coburn's "The Octopus" (1912) and the Modernist works of Paul Strand.

In 1910 Dubreuil sent Alfred Stieglitz twelve prints to be considered for Camera Work. Though none were published, six of the prints were exhibited alongside works of other Pictorialists at the International Exhibition of Pictorial Photography at the Albright Gallery in Buffalo, New York. In American Photography, critic F. Austin Lidbury wrote that the stand-out of the exhibition was "six extraordinarily interesting examples of Dubreuil's original, if distorted way of looking at things." In 1912 Dubreuil again implored Stieglitz, sending him five exceptional prints ("Notre Dame de Paris," "Eléphantaisie," "Grand Place Brussels," "Mightiness," and "Cascade, Place de la Concorde"). Although Stieglitz did not include the works in Camera Work (Stieglitz was known for not including more avant-garde and Modernist works in the publication), a 36-page article about Dubreuil by Cyrille Ménard appeared in Photo-Magazine. In the same year, Dubreuil exhibited his first one-man show, of 64 prints, at the Little Gallery of the Amateur Photographer Magazine in London.

==== Interwar period, Belgium (1924–1935) ====
The First World War disrupted Dubreuil's career, family, and ties to Lille. By 1923, when Dubreuil re-emerged into the photo world, the "Golden Age" of Pictorialism was over. In 1924 Dubreuil moved to Brussels, Belgium, where he incorporated new influences into his work: Belgian surrealism, James Ensor, and the de Stijl movement in Holland. In Belgium, elements of fantasy and dreams, abstract design, and deceptions based on scale permeated Dubreuil's later work. Though Dubreuil's work, like the work of many of the Late Pictorialists, was at times derided, his originality and adventurous work led to his election as a member of the London Salon, the most highly regarded artistic photographic society at the time. By 1935, Dubreuil had attained such stature that the Royal Photographic Society in London sponsored a retrospective exhibition of some 150 works by the then 63-year-old photographer. After 1935, though producing no new work, Dubreuil remained active in the photographic world as president of the Association Belge de Photographie et Cinematographie.

==== Later years ====
By 1937 Dubreuil's health began to decline, and he produced little new work. Tragically, in 1943 he sold his negatives and archives to the Gevaert firm in Belgium, which were destroyed in bombings during the war. Following his wife's death that same year, Pierre Dubreuil died in obscurity in Grenoble, France, on January 9, 1944.

== Tom Jacobson's search for Dubreuil ==
=== Rediscovering the photographer ===
Dubreuil's work was largely forgotten after his death in 1944 until Tom Jacobson, a San Diego, California-based collector, rediscovered his work. Dubreuil first caught Jacobson's attention in the late 1970s, when Jacobson saw works by Dubreuil in photography annuals such as The American Annual of Photography and Photographs of the Year. Guided by his keen photographic eye, Jacobson continued to spot works by Dubreuil, gaining knowledge about the then obscure photographer. In 1980, Jacobson ventured to Belgium to investigate what he considered to be a photographic genius. Through the trials and tribulations of knowing neither French nor Flemish, Jacobson eventually came into contact with the Association Belge de Photographie et Cinematographie.

=== Finding Dubreuil's lost work ===
Through a set of coincidences Jacobson acquired his first Dubreuil print in London, and went on to pursue newly uncovered (thanks to his insistence) works found in the Belgian Association's collection. Through years of unrelenting research and insistence, Jacobson was able to collect major remaining works by Dubreuil, and was even pursued by Samuel Wagstaff, who at one point dismissed Dubreuil, only to recognize his mistake later. Jacobson, who had discovered Dubreuil through an intuitive photographic eye, had succeeded in reintroducing the lost photographer; in October 1987, Jacobson's exhibition of Dubreuil opened at the prestigious Musée National d'Art Moderne at the Centre Georges Pompidou. The show amassed critical acclaim, and travelled to the Museum of Photographic Arts in San Diego, the Detroit Institute of Arts, and the Alliance française in New York. Jacobson's book Pierre Dubreuil: Photographs 1896–1935 was published in conjunction with the Pompidou show.

=== Acclaim for the Dubreuil Exhibition ===
French newspaper Le Figaro hailed the 1987 exhibition as "the dazzling revelation of an unknown talent," noting "a vision which is much more exciting than so many of the glories that encumber the histories of photography." The article commended Jacobson for having "discovered this treasure which was believed to have been lost."

Suszanne Muchnic of the LA Times recognized Jacobson's seven years researching Dubreuil, calling this "a major contribution to the field."

Vince Aletti of Village Voice described how "Virtually all of Dubreuil's surviving work, salvaged from oblivion by curator Tom Jacobson, floods this small room with charm and brilliance."

Notably, Vicki Goldberg declared the historical significance of the rediscovery of Dubreuil in American Photographer: "Dubreuil's daring pictorialist work may throw a wrench into the history of 20th century photography."

== Philosophy, Quotes ==
=== Quotes by Dubreuil ===
"Chance is the enemy of the photographer"

"Every work should be the expression of an idea [...] This must never be left to chance ... I plan almost all of my works beforehand."

"Why should the inspiration that exudes from an artist's manipulation of the hairs of a brush be any different from that of the artist who bends at will the rays of light?"

"In photography, a much greater importance should be given to the intellectual aspect of the work. Indeed, it should become the main artistic factor. Isn't it the intellectual work that is responsible for creating the feelings we experience in the presence of a masterpiece? Isn't it thanks to this that an intense communion between author and viewer can be achieved?"

=== Quotes about Dubreuil ===
"Some say he is a fanatic, an eccentric; others insist that he is one of the rare photographers who have ideas that will last. Such a contradiction should not surprise us; it has always been associated with those whose names have become famous in literature and the arts ... Yes, Pierre Dubreuil is the subject of violent discussions in our country. He knows this better than anyone; it does not discourage him ... Let time do her work ... Where necessary time honors those stars that are too modest or unknown and drowns the glorious, arrogant ephemera in shadow and oblivion" - Cyrille Ménard

"What makes his pictures so outstanding can be summed up in a few words ... Dubreuil's pictures are 'seen,' seen through the eyes of an artist." - Fritz Loescher

"To the present-day photographer, the name of Pierre Dubreuil ... stands for one of the extremists of photography ... he is one of the three to whose influence and example the development of the 'New Photography' is to be traced, the others being Malcolm Arbutnot in England and Paul Strand in America." - J. Dudley Johnston

== Bibliography ==
- Ribemont Francis et Daum Patrick (dir.), La Photographie pictorialiste en Europe, catalog of the exhibition (from October 19, 2005 to January 15, 2006, Musée des Beaux-Arts de Rennes), Le Point du Jour Editeur and Musée des Beaux-Arts de Rennes, 2005.
- Cyrille Ménard, "Les Maîtres de la Photographie," Photo Magazine, no. 18, 1912.
- Tom Jacobson, Pierre Dubreuil, publication accompanying exhibition (Musée d'Art Moderne, Centre Georges Pompidou). Dubroni Press, San Diego, CA. 1987.
- Tom Jacobson, "Pierre Dubreuil's Great Photographic Hoax" (2015)
