= Photo-club de Paris =

French photographic society

Photo-club of Paris
- Photo-club de Paris
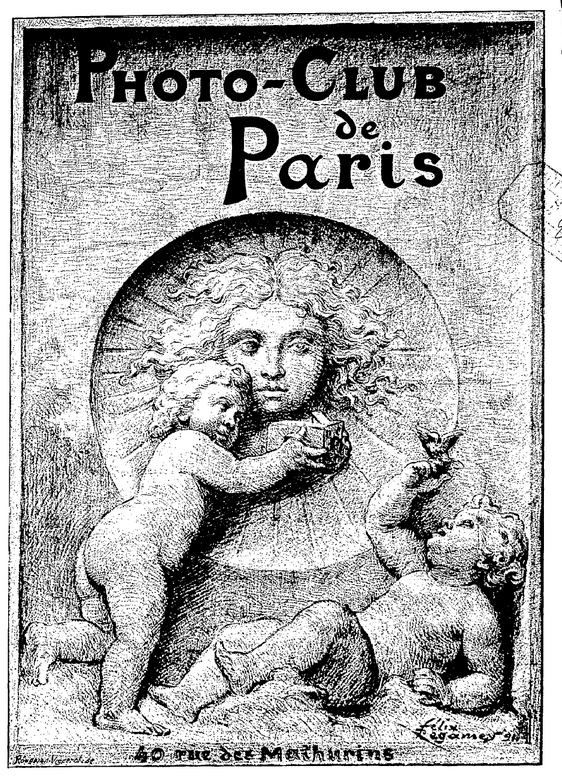
- Formation: 1888
- Type: Photography club
- Purpose: Artistic photography
- Headquarters: Paris
- Location: France
- Official language: French
- Founder: Robert Demachy; Maurice Bucquet

The Photo-club de Paris was a French photographic society for amateur photographers, established in 1888, committed to advancing the art of photography.

== History ==
The Photo-club de Paris was established in 1888 by Robert Demachy and Maurice Bucquet, both former members of the Société française de photographie (SFP). The club was an exclusive association for French amateur photographers, significantly contributing to the evolution of artistic photography. Members of the Photo-club promoted the aesthetic principles of Pictorialism. It became one of the leading societies that directed the worldwide artistic movement in the photographic field, including the Vienna Camera Club, the Linked Ring in London, the Belgian Association of Photography ("l'Association belge de Photographie"), and the Gesellschaft zur Förderung der Amateur-Photographie in Hamburg. The active participation of amateur photographers led to further development of fine artistic ideas expressed through photography.

Maurice Bucquet was appointed as the president of the Photo-club de Paris in 1890. During that year, the establishment of the Photo-club de Reims was announced by M. Marteau, a corresponding member of the Photo-club.

In 1891, the photographic society was led by Dr. Édouard Dujardin-Beaumetz as president. The board of directors was made up of Dr. H. Labonne, the president; Maurice Bucquet, the secretary; Paul Bourgeois, the archivist-librarian; Paul Gers, the treasurer; and included members Henri Guérin, Achille Darnis, Count Desmaziéres, A. Darius-Touslain, Paul Houdé, Dr. Jouslain, Emmanuel Mathieu, and Professor A. Rossignol.

The art-focused Photo-club de Paris distanced themselves from the technically oriented Société française de photographie in 1894.

In 1897, the board of directors comprised M. Bucquet (president), Emmanuel Mathieu (vice president), Paul Bourgeois (secretary general), A. Darnis (archivist-librarian), Henri Guérin (treasurer), alongside members like Robert Demachy, Maurice Binder, Maurice Brémard, Paul Gers, C. Puyo, Paul Naudot, and André Toutain.

=== Headquarters ===
The headquarters of the Photo-club de Paris was located in Paris, France at 40 Rue des Mathurins. In 1895, the club had a room for small meetings. The studio, complete with well-lit dressing rooms, catered to photographic activities. Below the studio, there was a changing plate room free from water and chemicals, leading to four dark rooms. These could be reserved by Paris-based members for a fee, while provincial members could use them when not booked, with 150 members from Paris. The club notably used daylight for enlarging prints and organized spaces dedicated to various printing techniques. In the following year, the Photo-club of Paris, steadily increasing in numbers, was preparing to change its quarters. It was set to build in the centre of Paris, a small five-story structure with lift, studio, laboratories, and salon.

By 1903, the structure was described as expansive, featuring numerous rooms, one of which served as an audience room for hosting the annual Paris Photographic Salons. Member and visitor facilities included developing rooms, with a particular ground-floor room for visitors available at no cost. Visitors could purchase materials and utilize the services of the club's twelve employees, managed by Paul Bourgeois, the secretary general. The club provided personalized developing, printing, and finishing services, which served as an important revenue stream.

=== Publication ===
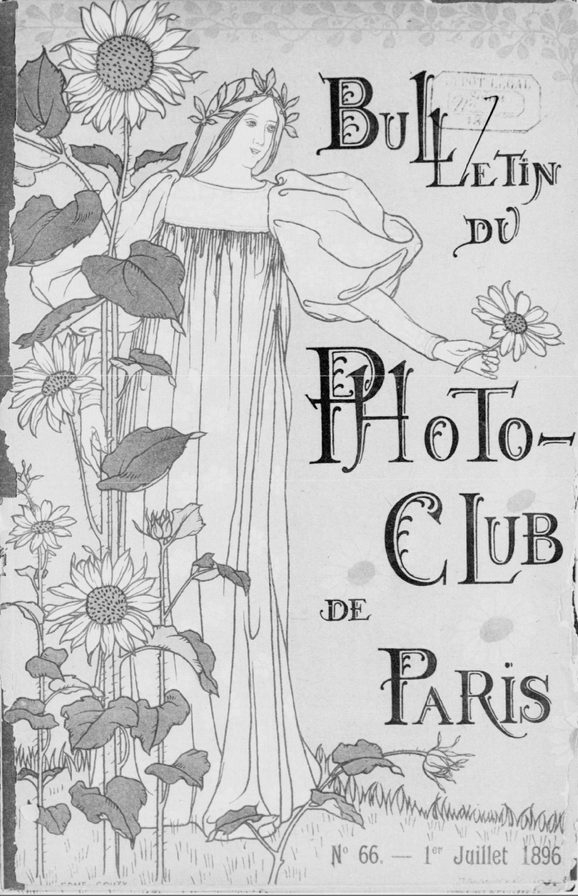
Bulletin du Photo-club de Paris, July 1896.

In 1891, the Paris Photo-club launched its own photographic journal titled the Bulletin du Photo-club de Paris, which served as the official publication of the society. It was under the editorship of the secretary general, Paul Bourgeois.

France's provincial clubs leveraged the journal to report on their activities, using it as a platform for information exchange and to cultivate a collective identity. The clubs were centers where members could share dark rooms, equipment, listen to lectures, view demonstrations, and exhibit their work. The journals reproduced these lectures, displayed photographic examples, and shared technical knowledge, thereby shaping the discourse and ethos surrounding amateur photography. Frédéric Dillaye, a French writer, wrote a series of articles published in the bulletin describing the aesthetic effects of photography.

A work titled Aesthetics of photography (French: Esthétique de la Photographie) was published in 1900 by the Photo-Club of Paris under the direction of Paul Borgeois.

=== Exposition d'art photographique ===
The Photo-club de Paris soon staged its first exhibition of artistic photography, originally scheduled to take place from December 10 to 30, 1893. Constant Puyo, Robert Demachy, Maurice Bucquet, and René Le Bègue co-organized the club's first exhibition. In the opening month of 1894, they managed to host one of the era's most celebrated international artistic photography exhibitions. The inaugural event, named the "Première Exposition d'art photographique," was held at the Galerie Georges Petit from January 10th to 30th, 1894, showcasing more than 500 selected photographs. The jury panel for admissions included six painters, one engraver, one fine arts inspector, and two amateur photographers. In a large, well-lit, and orderly setting, with the best possible lighting, the works were arranged by the nationality of the artists. The photographs from Austria, notably by Hugo Henneberg, Heinrich Kühn, and Hans Watzek, were especially noted at the photographic salon. While no formal awards were given, each exhibitor was presented with a silvered bronze medal, uniquely engraved with their name as a memento.

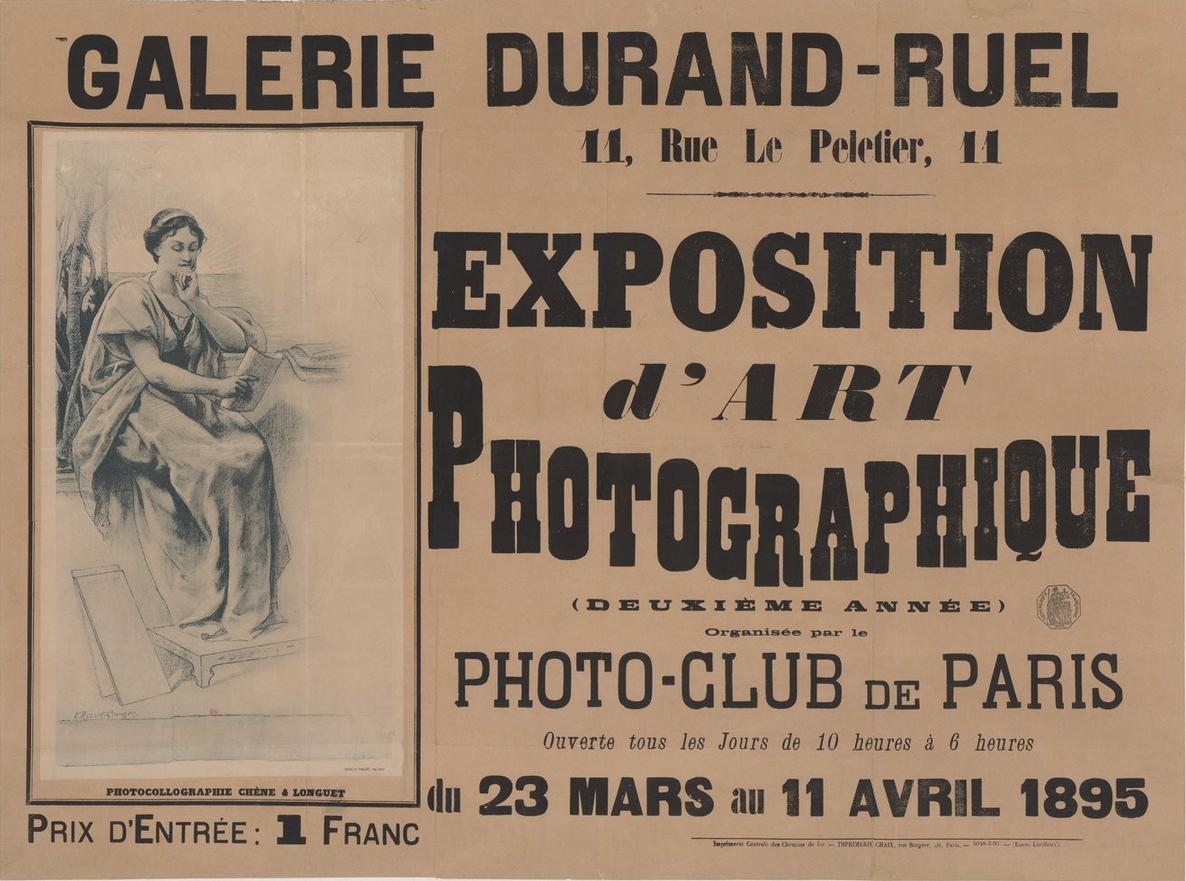
Exposition d'art photographique, Galerie Durand-Ruel, 1897.

In the following year, the Galerie Durand-Ruel on 11 Rue le Peletier hosted the second annual Exposition d'art photographique. By 1897, the Paris photographic exhibitions were held at the Galerie des Champs-Elysées. The conventions successfully continued into the 20th century. The club also sent approved work of members to photographic exhibitions in other cities to serve as a club exhibit.

== Notable members ==
- Robert Demachy
- Maurice Bucquet
- Albert Londe
- Constant Puyo
- René Le Bègue
- Paul Bergon
- Hugo Henneberg
- Heinrich Kühn
- Hans Watzek
- Gabriel Lippmann (honorary member)
- Jules Janssen (honorary member)
- Étienne-Jules Marey (honorary member)
