= Hugo Henneberg =

Austrian photographer (1863–1918)

- Born: Hugo Henneberg; 27 July 1863; Vienna, Austrian Empire
- Died: 11 July 1918 (aged 54); Vienna, Austria
- Occupations: Scientist; Photographer
- Known for: Photography
- Movement: Pictorialism

Hugo Henneberg (27 July 1863 – 11 July 1918) was an Austrian scientist, graphic artist, and art photographer.

== Early life and education ==
Hugo Henneberg was born on 27 July 1863 in Vienna, Austrian Empire.

Henneberg departed from his family home at the age of eleven to go to grammar school at Schnepfenthal Salzmann School. Upon his return, he completed his high school studies in Vienna. He was attending Vienna's K.K. Franz-Joseph-Gymnasium in the early 1880s. In 1882, Henneberg devoted himself to studies in physics, chemistry, astronomy, and mathematics at the Vienna University and later in Jena.

He partnered with Vienna's Richard O. Lorenz on a patent filed under the 'Electrical apparatus and telegraphy' category for electric arc lamps on 26 May 1883. In December 1884, they entered a patent in Berlin for innovations in regulators for electric arc lamps.

Henneberg received his doctorate in physics at the University of Jena in 1887. Shortly after, Dr. Hugo Henneberg travelled to North America in 1888. In 1889, he published an article on the thermal conductivity of mixtures of ethyl alcohol and water in the scientific journal, Annalen der Physik. In 1890, he visited Egypt and Greece.

== Career ==
As a young man, he was drawn to photography, beginning by constructing a camera from an opera glass lens housed in a cigar box. By 1887, he took up artistic photography.

=== Vienna Camera Club ===
In 1891, he had become a member of Vienna's photographic society, the Vienna Camera Club (German: Wiener Camera-Klub). That year, the club arranged the premiere International Exhibition of Artistic Photography, where several English pictorialists were featured for the first time in Vienna. Henneberg displayed a landscape of Nasswald, Austria, at the 1891 Photographic Exhibition of Artistic Photographs held in the Museum of Applied Arts.

Hugo Henneberg made an appearance at an exhibition of the Salzburg Amateur Club in the Marble Hall of the Mirabell Palace in June 1893. In Salzburg, Henneberg was recognized for presenting finely executed landscapes. His entries in the exhibition catalogue, including "Sailing Ship," "Still Waters," "Autumn Evening," and "Villa Floridiana near Naples," were praised for their atmospheric quality, scenic beauty, and the skillful execution of each photograph. While examining Henneberg's pictures, the dignitaries of Salzburg showed their admiration, commenting, "The man must have excellent glasses."

Henneberg's photographic works were part of the Photo-club de Paris's "Première Exposition d'art photographique" at the Galerie Georges Petit in Paris in January 1894.

=== The Linked Ring ===
The Austrian amateur photographer was admitted to the British photographic society, The Linked Ring, in 1894 with Hans Watzek and became closely associated with Heinrich Kühn. That year, the Linked Ring Brotherhood featured Henneberg's artworks in their 1894 Photographic Salon at the Dudley Gallery in the Egyptian Hall, Piccadilly, London. He exhibited various works including "Evening Calm", "November", and "Landscape". The following London Photographic Salon in 1895 also included an exhibit of Henneberg's works.

In January 1895, at an award ceremony of the Viennese Photographic Society, he was awarded a silver medal for four atmospheric landscape studies by the jury of the society.

=== Gum Printing ===
Hugo Henneberg witnessed French photographer Robert Demachy's work with single-layer gum prints at a photographic exhibition in 1895. Henneberg brought the gum bichromate process to the attention of Kühn that year. The process revived by Demachy was soon studied and practiced to perfection by Henneberg, Watzek, and Kühn. The men verified, corrected, and completed the previous studies of Rouillé-Ladevéze. Through experimentation, Henneberg and Kühn discovered that burnt sienna was key to printing from high-contrast negatives using the gum process. They advocated for more gum for richer tones and softer colors, suggesting a solution of an equal mix of gum and water, without preservatives. Henneberg highlighted that the critical aspect was the correct application of gum, pointing out previous mistakes like using too much or too little gum, thin coatings, overprinting, and overly hot water. Hugo Henneberg published an article titled "The Gum Bichromate Process" in the March 1896 issue of the Wiener Photographische Blätter. It was a practical article on the technique of gum printing.

=== The Viennese Trifolium ===
By 1896, the trio of Henneberg, Kühn, and Watzek formed the 'Vienesse Trifolium,' or 'The Clover Leaf' (German: Das Kleeblatt), a subset of the Vienna Camera Club. Each member adopted a three-leaf clover in their signature. The three internationally known photographers traveled together to northern and southern Germany, to Italy and Holland and engaged in photography and collective exhibitions. Engaging with the photographic societies in the Netherlands, they made several visits to Noordwijk and Katwijk. The Clover Leaf collective adopted the gum bichromate technique, inventing a multi-layer gum print that allowed for the separation of tones in their images.

In January 1897, Henneberg did a German translation of an article by Demachy for Wiener Photographische Blätter, the periodical of the Vienna Camera Club.

The Viennese artist was among the exhibitors showcasing gum prints at the London Photographic Salon in October 1897. Three of Henneberg's photos were exhibited at the Dudley Gallery in Piccadilly, London.

He was named a corresponding member of the Society for the Promotion of Amateur Photography (German: Gesellschaft zur Förderung der Amateur Photographie) in Hamburg, Germany on 19 November 1897. On 25 January 1898, M. Pichier of the Association of Friends of Photography Königsberg (German: Verein von Freunden der Photographie Königsberg) proposed Henneberg as an honorary member, recognizing his significance in artistic photography and the association's growth following his 1897 exhibition.

In 1898, Henneberg showcased 10 works at an exhibition of the Camera Club in Vienna. His work titled "Italian Villa in Autumn" was said to resemble the style of a Böcklin chalk drawing rather than a traditional photograph. Henneberg's prints were similar to oil Underpaintings, prioritizing color over form, featuring "Baltic Sea Beach," "Old Cypress," and "Motif at Stillfried."

In March 1899, Hugo Henneberg's work was exhibited at the Exhibition of Pictorial Photography in Berlin, Germany. He was credited by Hugo Müller as one of the first who tried to introduce color using the gum-bichromate process.

Henneberg had a villa designed and built by architect Josef Hoffmann of the Vienna Secession between 1900 and 1901 in the Hohe Warte district in Vienna. The Villa Henneberg was situated at Steinfeldgasse no. 4. He resided within an artist colony where the residences of Friedrich Viktor Spitzer, Koloman Moser, and Carl Moll were located. He had a photo studio and darkroom installed in his home. At the 8th Exhibition of the Vienna Secession in late 1900, Henneberg bought a smoker's cabinet by Charles Rennie Mackintosh for his nearly completed Hoffman-designed house.

In 1901–1902, Henneberg notably commissioned his friend Gustav Klimt to create a portrait of his wife, Marie Henneberg. Originally hung above the fireplace in the living room of Villa Henneberg, Klimt's 'Portrait of Marie Henneberg' has since been moved to the Belvedere Palace and Museum.

After Watzek's untimely death in 1903, Henneberg's enthusiasm for photography faded. By 1904, he shifted towards woodcutts, revisiting themes from his earlier gum prints. He immersed himself in etching, drawing, painting nudes, and landscapes, driven by a passion for broadening his artistic scope.

== Death ==
Hugo Henneberg died on 11 July 1918 in Vienna, Austria. His final request while on his deathbed was to wear a work coat.

== Works ==
- Evening Calm
- On the Highway
- Village in Pomerania
- Stormy Weather
- Italian Villa in Autumn
- Baltic Sea Beach
- Old Cypress
- Motif at Stillfried
- An Orchard
- After Sunset
- Villa Torlonia
- At the Rushy Pool
- The Schönberg Palace
- Am Hof in Winter

== Gallery ==
Photos by Hugo Henneberg

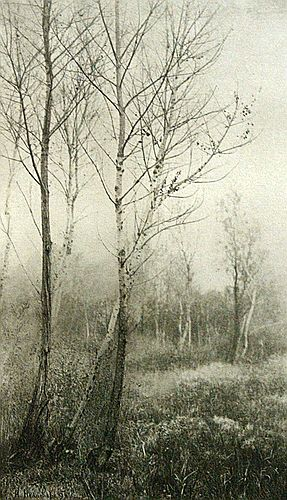
November (1894)

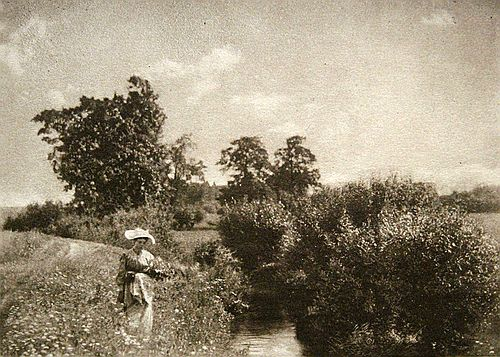
En Eté (1894)

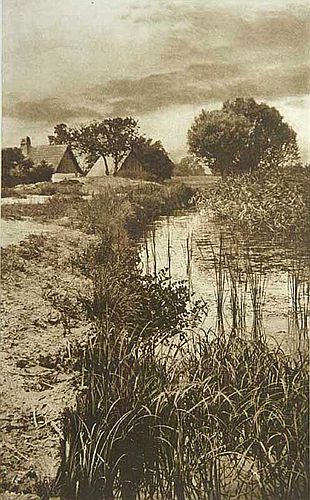
At the Rushy Pool (1895)

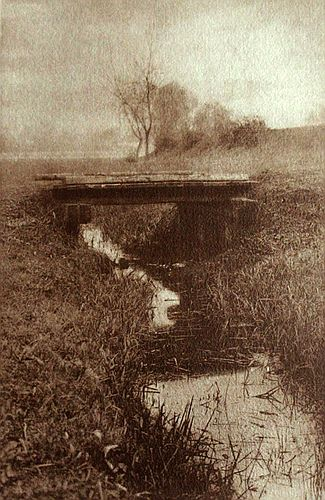
Le Pont (1896)

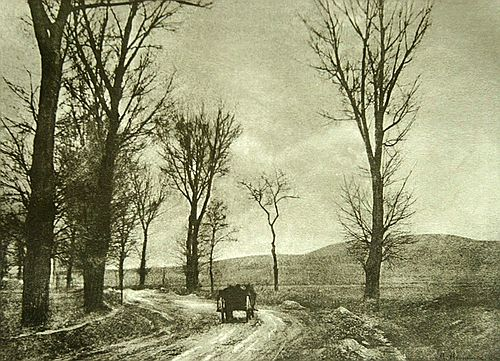
Auf Der Landstrasse (1897)

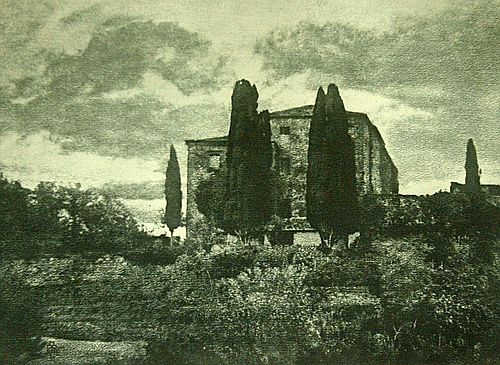
Italienische Villa Im Herbst (1897)

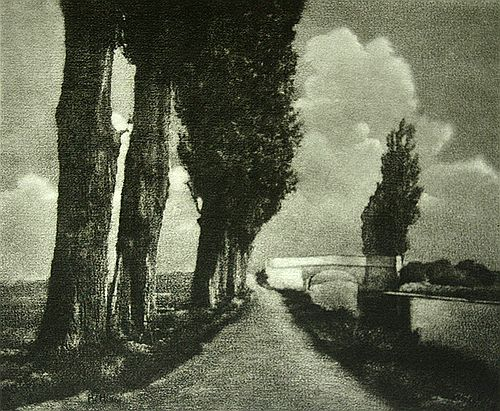
Am Kanal (1899)

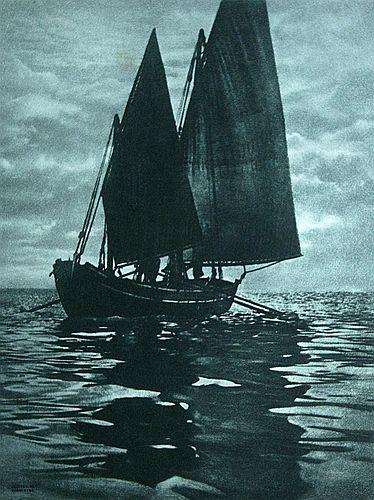
Ruhige See (1899)
