= Hans Watzek =

Austrian photographer (1848–1903)

Hanz Watzek
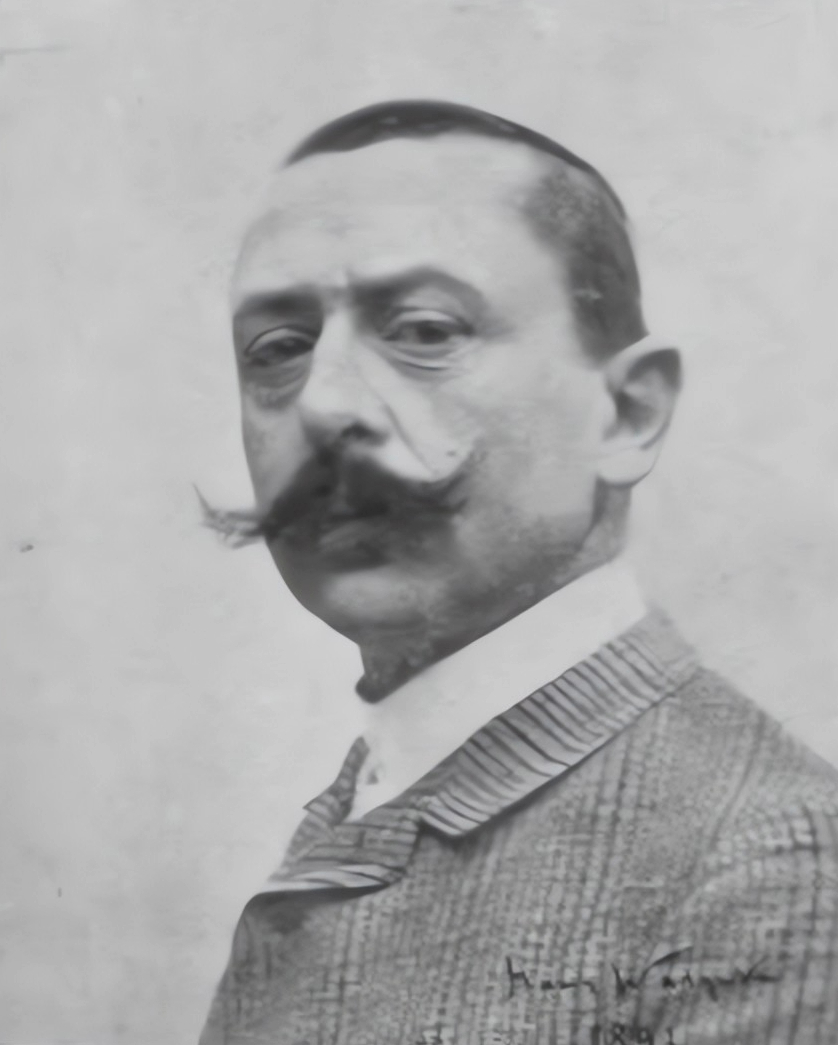
- Hans Watzek in 1891
- Born: Johann Josef Watzek; 20 December 1848; Bílina, Bohemia, Austrian Empire
- Died: 12 May 1903 (aged 54); Vienna, Austria
- Occupation: Photographer
- Known for: Photography
- Movement: Pictorialism

Hans Watzek (20 December 1848 – 12 May 1903) was an Austrian art photographer and drawing teacher. Born in Bohemia, he was active in Vienna, Austria.

== Early life and education ==
Johann Josef Watzek was born on 20 December 1848 in Bílina, Bohemia, Austrian Empire.

By the mid-1860s, he went to study in Germany at the art academies in Leipzig and Munich, later establishing himself as a freelance artist.

== Career ==
Between 1872 and 1875, his profession was teaching drawing, and he later accepted a position at the Oberrealschule in Vienna, Austria. He became a member of the Association of Austrian Drawing Teachers (German: Verein österreichischer Zeichenlehrer). The elections for the association in 1882 resulted in Watzek's appointment as deputy to the chairman, Professor Anton Prix. In 1892, Watzek was involved in a commission focused on the reform of secondary school art education within the Association of Austrian Drawing Teachers. The commission worked four years to present art education reforms to the public, targeting both Austria and abroad.

In the early 1890s, Hans Watzek took an interest in the art of photography and over time, he became a significant representative of pictorialism in Vienna. He joined the Vienna Camera Club (German: Wiener Camera-Klub), a group of amateur photographers formed to advance artistic photography, established in 1891.

Inspired by Alfred Maskell's display at an 1891 exhibit by members of the Linked Ring at the Vienna Camera Club, he began using a pinhole camera, later expanding his technique to include an ordinary spectacle lens or monocle. Watzek conducted an in-depth study on the application of a monocle lens roughly 4 cm in diameter. He contributed an article to The Photographic Times in 1894 called "The Monocle: A Landscape Lens," outlining how monocles can be adapted for landscape photography.

He was admitted to the Linked Ring by 1894, alongside Austrian photographer Hugo Henneberg, and during that year, he became associated with Heinrich Kühn. The trio of Watzek, Henneberg, and Kühn were at the forefront of the Pictorialist movement in Austria, forming the "Trifolium" (or "Das Kleeblatt") by 1897. The three photographers traveled together and engaged in photography and collective exhibitions. Their journeys took them through the diverse landscapes of northern and southern Germany, Italy, and Holland for work-related purposes.

French photographer Robert Demachy's expertise in gum printing greatly influenced Watzek in 1895. Watzek was among those using the gum bichromate process by 1896, along with Henneberg and Kühn. As a New Year's gift in 1897, he introduced the Vienna Camera Club to the first three-colour gum print. His photographs, using the gum printing technique, were showcased at an 1898 exhibit sponsored by the Munich Secession.

From February to March 1899, Watzek's work was showcased at the Exhibition of Pictorial Photography held in Berlin.

== Death ==
Hans Watzek died on 12 May 1903 in Vienna, Austria. Despite his severe illness, Watzek was still dedicated to working on a gum print on the very day he died.

== Legacy ==
At the 1904 Great Art Exhibition (German: Grosse Künstaustellung) in Dresden, Germany, the works of landscape photographers Watzek, Kühn, and Henneberg were showcased. Alfred Stieglitz later showcased their gum bichromate prints at The Little Galleries of Photo-Secession in 1906. A photogravure of Hans Watzek's "Sheep", among other works, was published by Stieglitz in Camera Work in January 1906.

== Works ==
- Kibitz
- Fishing Boats Returning
- On the Elbe
- Sheep

== Photos by Hans Watzek ==
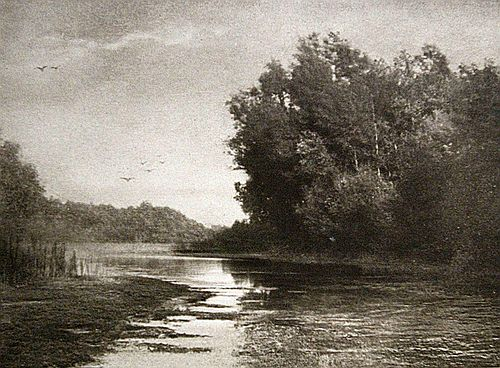
An der Donau (1894)

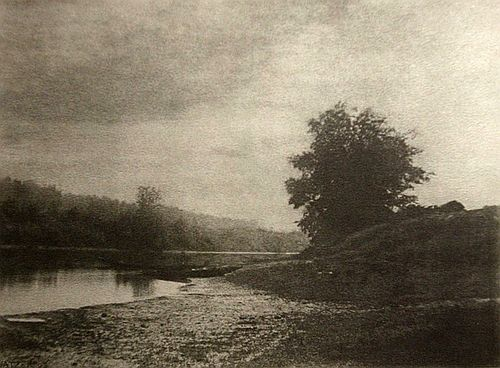
Sommernacht (1896)

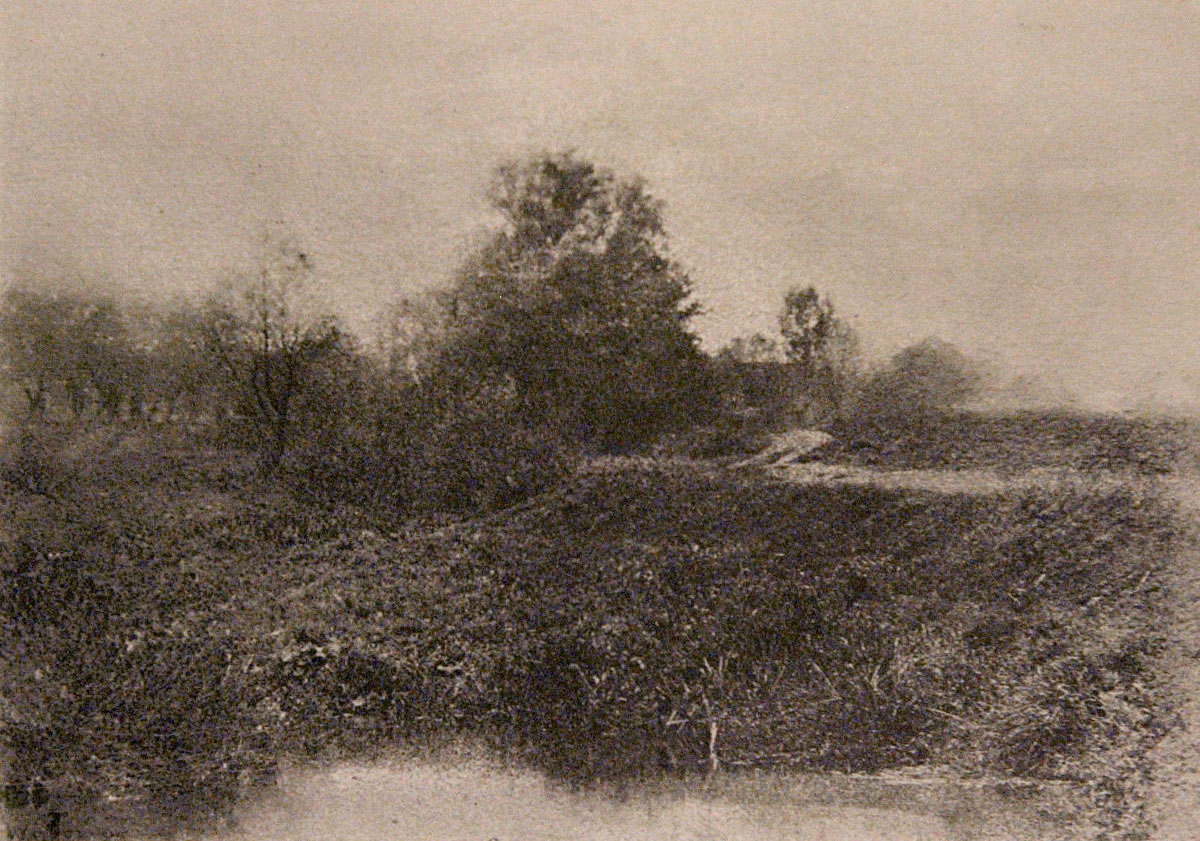
Soir d'automne (1896)

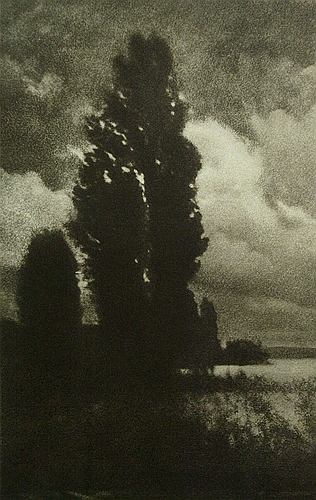
Pappeln Und Wolken (1900)

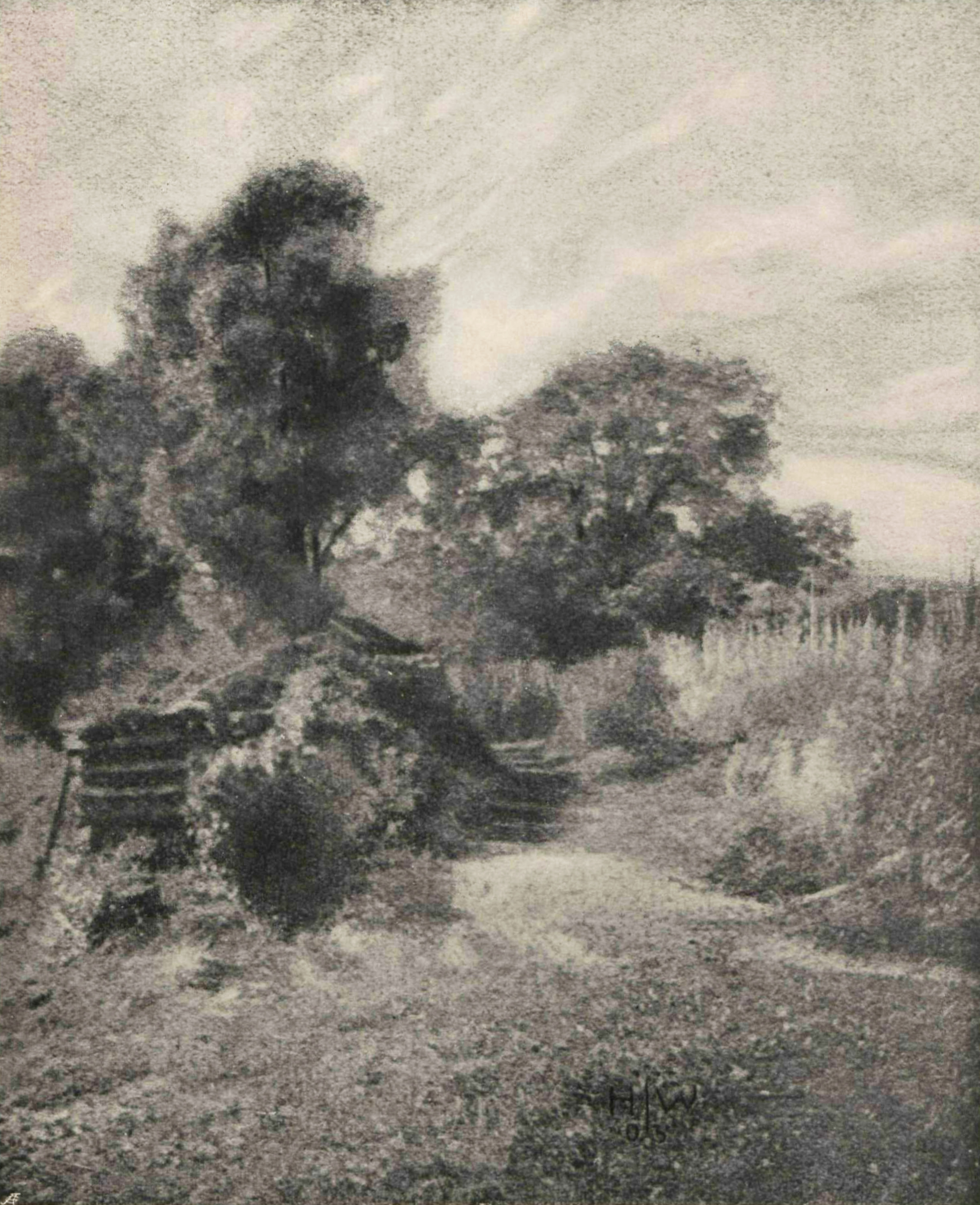
Landschaft (1904)

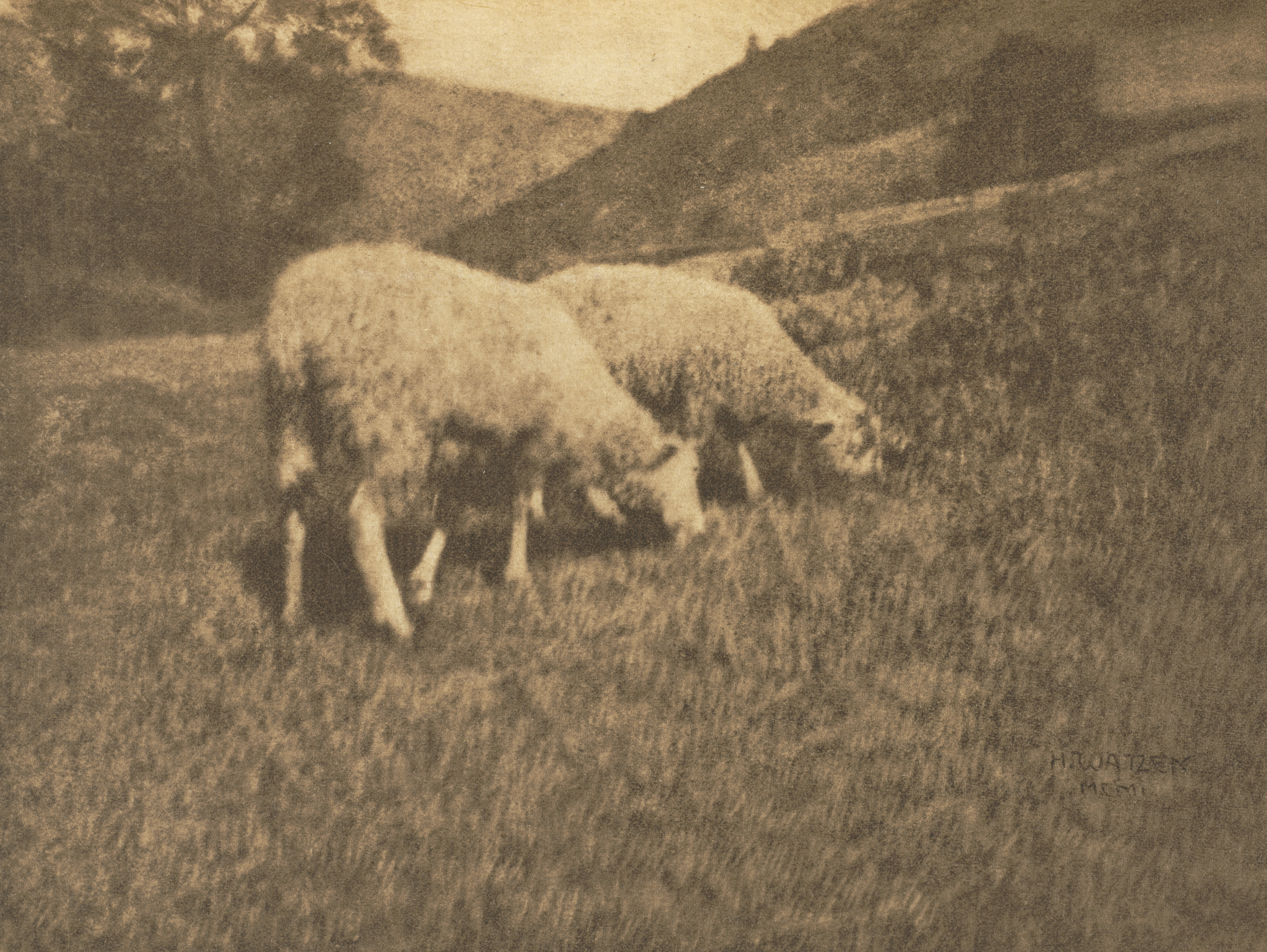
Sheep (1906)
