= The Photographic Times =

American photography magazine (1871–1915)

January 6, 1893 issue

The Photographic Times was a publication in the United States. First published in 1871 as a supplement of The Philadelphia Photographer, it "absorbed" The American Photographer in 1879 and became The Photographic Times and American Photographer. It merged with Anthony's Bulletin in 1902 to become The Photographic Times Bulletin.

It was published in New York by Scovill Manufacturing Co. from 1881 to 1894. J. Traill Taylor was its editor in 1883. Scoville made copper film for daguerreotype photography and cameras. In 1893, W. L. Lincoln Adams was its editor.

Originally free except for postage, it changed over time as its parent company merged and the paper's leadership changed.

John B. Peddle, Sadakichi Hartmann, and Hans Watzek wrote for it.

It published the article "The Work of Miss Florence Maynard".

Clarence Hudson White had photographs published in it. Oscar G. Mason was a staff contributor.

For several years its cover was adorned with a design by English bookplate artist George Richard Quested and included the Roman goddess Veritas. In 1915 it was absorbed into Popular Photography.
