= Galerie des Champs-Elysées =

Former exhibition hall in Paris, France

Galerie des Champs-Élysées
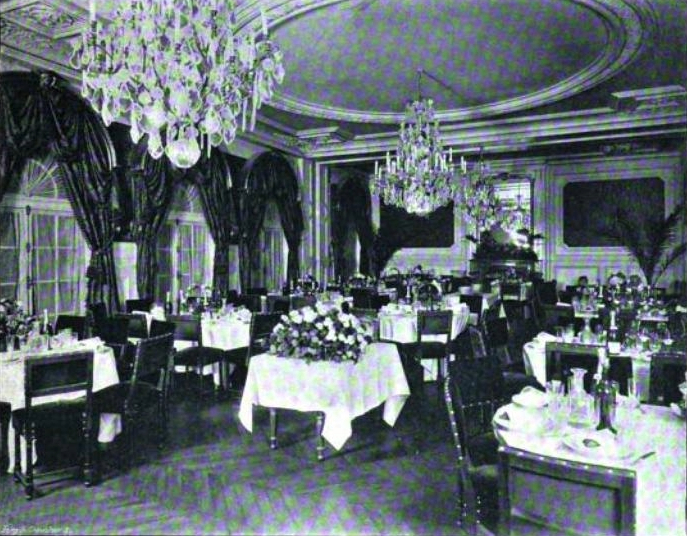
- La Grande Salle à Manger, Galerie des Champs-Élysées
- Established: 1890s
- Location: Avenue des Champs-Élysée, rue de Ponthieu; Paris, France
- Type: Exhibition hall
- Architect: Eugène-Joseph-Armand Duquesne

Galerie des Champs-Élysées (English: Gallery of Champs-Élysées) was a French exhibition hall and venue established on Avenue des Champs-Élysées in Paris, France.

== History ==
The Galerie des Champs-Elysées was located in the 8th arrondissement of Paris, France during the late 19th century. It took its name from the iconic Parisian avenue of Champs-Élysées. The gallery, situated at 72 avenue des Champs-Élysées and rue de Ponthieu, was primarily used for public meetings, dances, and banquets and rented by its owners, Fabre et Cie, to various tenants. The Galerie des Champs-Élysées was designed by French architect Eugène-Joseph-Armand Duquesne.

Modeled on English customs relatively new in France, the Galerie des Champs-Elysées combined luxury with elegance with its opulent design and private ambiance. It preserved the elegance of a private mansion rather than resembling a commercial space. The venue featured luxurious lounges for dinners, balls, concerts, and conferences, as well as a winter garden, cloakroom, billiard room, and smoking room. Its 900-meter space hosted high-profile events attended by Parisian elites, including artistic exhibitions, charity sales, and dramatic performances. Becoming a social hub for Parisian high society, the Galerie des Champs-Elysées hosted figures like the Marquis de Bassano, the Viscount Desmontiers, Henri Germain, Schreiber, Firmin Didot, and Christen, mayor of the 8th arrondissement. The notable socialites to attend balls at the gallery were the Princess of Poix, the Princess Murat, the Countess of Ganay, the Countess Le Marois, and Mrs. Seminario, among others.

In 1895, the Parisian venue hosted the Napoleonic Exhibition known as the Historical and Military Exhibition of the Revolution and the Empire (French: Exposition historique et militaire de la révolution et de l'empire).

In 1896, a legal dispute unfolded between the gallery's proprietors and the Society of Authors, Composers, and Music Publishers (French: Société des Auteurs, Compositeurs et Editeurs de Musique) who placed an injunction on the hall. In January, the society had issued a notice prohibiting the performance of any of their copyrighted literary or musical works during public events held within the Galerie des Champs-Elysées. They claimed that on 1 and 8 February 1896, the venue hosted public balls in which a large number of musical works authored by members of the Society were unlawfully performed without authorization. Fabre et Cie, asserting their role as mere landlords and not event organizers, sued for 100,000 francs in damages, arguing they had no control over the content of events in their rented space. The court ruled in favor of Fabre et Cie, stating that as property owners, they were not liable for copyright infringements by tenants or event organizers. On 25 May 1897, the Civil Court of Paris issued a judgment and ordered the Society to pay Fabre et Cie a reduced sum of 3,000 francs in damages. The ban by the Society was an overreach, since they could only authorize or deny performance rights, not ban locations, risking significant harm to Fabre et Cie through customer loss and reputational damage. The decision was upheld by the Paris Court of Appeal in 1899.

The work of Duquesne, the venue's architect, was exhibited at the 12th Annual Exhibition of the Architectural League of New York in 1897, showcasing the plan, elevation, and transverse section of the building.

In May 1896, the Photo-club de Paris began hosting its Exposition d'Art Photographique at the Galerie des Champs-Elysées. The annual photographic exhibition was hosted at the gallery in April 1897.

At the Galerie Champs-Elysées, the Society of Amateurs (French: La Société des Amateurs), led by Count Guy de La Rochefoucauld and François Fournier-Sarlovèze, presented its second Salon in 1897. Attended by Félix Faure, the President of the Republic, the event showcased notable works by distinguished amateurs and Parisian elites, including Princess Françoise of Orléans, the Duchess of Chartres, Winnaretta Singer, the Princess of Polignac, and the Countess of Havrincourt, emphasizing art trends among high society.

From 4 May to 15 June 1902, the venue welcomed the Exposition de Photographie des Amateurs du Kodak.

== Gallery ==
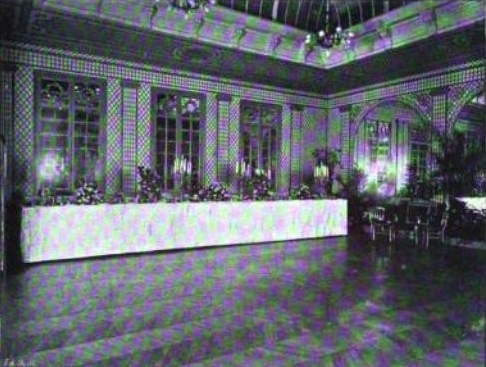
Le Jardin d'Hiver

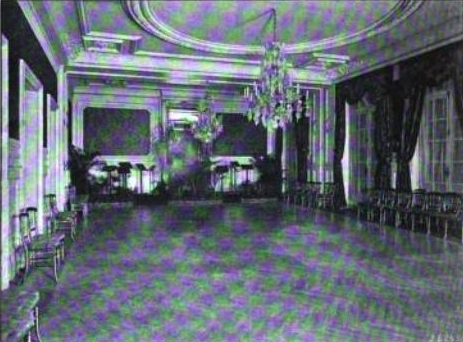
Le Grand Salon
