= Paul Bergon =

Louis-Jacques-Paul Bergon (27 September 1863 in Paris – 27 January 1912) was a French photographer, musician and naturalist. He was a nephew of photographer René Le Bègue (1857–1914).

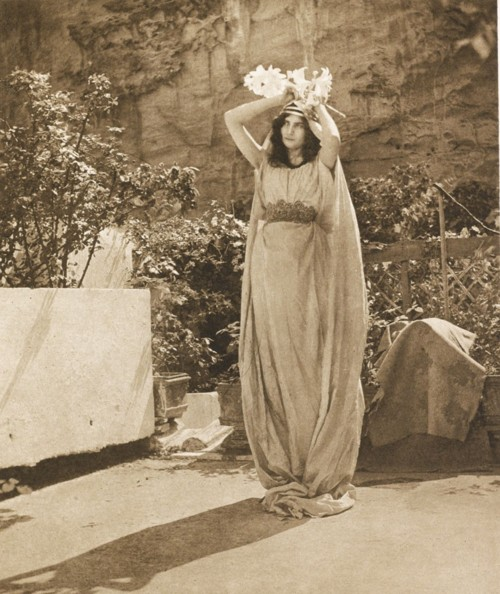
"Sakuntala"

Son of a banker, he was introduced to photography by members of his family circle. Around 1885, he began his career in photography in earnest. He is considered to be an important representative of French pictorialism. A member of the Société française de photographie from 1896, he experimented with color photography at the advent of "Autochrome Lumière" (1907). He specialized in photographing nudes.

In the field of orchidology, with Edmond Gustave Camus and Aimée Antoinette Camus, he was co-author of Monographie des orchidées de l'Europe : de l'Afrique septentrionale, de l'Asie Mineure et des provinces Russes transcaspiennes ("Monograph of orchids from Europe, northern Africa, Asia Minor and the Russian Trans-Caspian provinces", 1908). His monograph on the diatom genus Entogonia was later translated into English and published with the title "Diatomaceae : Bergon's monograph on Entogonia : translation into English of descriptions of species and varieties". In 1906 he became a member of the Société botanique de France. The French Academy of Sciences awarded him the Prix Thore for 1909.

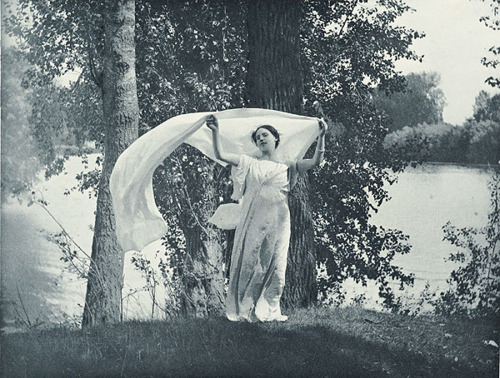
"Etude de plein air"

== Works associated with photography, music and dance ==
- "Danse d'Espagne", 1895
- "Danse javanaise", 1895
- "Femme nue dans la nature"
- "Femme drapée dans un paysage"
- "Nu allongé"
- "Art photographique : le nu et le drapé en plein air", 1898.
