= Gum printing =

Chemical method of making photographic prints

Gum printing is a way of making photographic reproductions without the use of silver halides. The process uses salts of dichromate in common with a number of other related processes such as sun printing.

Gum prints tend to be multi-layered images sometimes combined with other alternative process printing methods such as cyanotype and platinotype. A heavy weight cotton watercolor or printmaking paper that can withstand repeated and extended soakings is best. Each layer of pigment is individually coated, registered, exposed and washed. Separation negatives of cyan, magenta, and yellow or red, green, and blue are used for a full-color image. Some photographers prefer substituting the cyan emulsion in the CMYK separations with a cyanotype layer. A simple duotone separation combining orange watercolor pigment and a cyanotype can yield surprisingly beautiful results.

== History ==
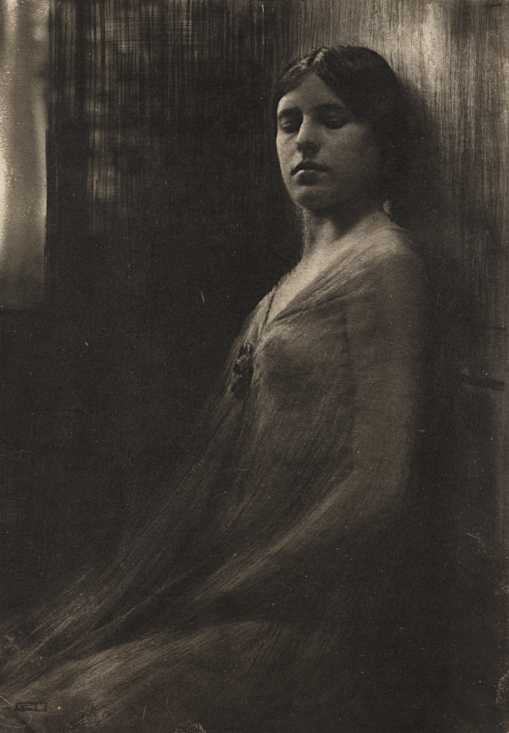
A gum bichromate by Robert Demachy

Gum bichromate, or gum dichromate as it is also known, is a photographic printing process invented in the early days of photography when, in 1839, Mungo Ponton discovered that dichromates are light sensitive. William Henry Fox Talbot later found that sensitized dichromated colloids such as gelatin and gum arabic became insoluble in water after exposure to sunlight. Alphonse Poitevin added carbon pigment to the colloids in 1855, creating the first carbon print. In 1858, John Pouncy used watercolor, colored pigment mixed with gum arabic, so that images could be printed in colors other than black. The process later became popular with Pictorialist photographers such as Robert Demachy and Constant Puyo in France and Edward Steichen in the United States.

== Gum printing ==
When mixtures of mucilaginous, protein-containing materials together with soluble salts of dichromate are exposed to ultraviolet light, the protein content becomes tanned and resistant to solution in water. The untanned material can be washed away in warm water leaving a hardened, tanned protein negative.

For gum printing a solution of gum arabic is mixed with either potassium or ammonium dichromate. The higher the proportion of dichromate, the more sensitive the mixture. However, increasing the concentration of dichromate also reduces the contrast which is very low at best. The right concentration of dichromate is always a compromise between speed and contrast.

Using ammonium dichromate allows concentrations up to 15% of the active ingredient whereas potassium dichromate is limited to about 10%. Exceeding these concentrations results in deposits of chromic acid in the dried film which ruins any attempts at printing. The greatest sensitivity expressed as an ASA speed rating is estimated to be about ASA 0.003. The resulting mucilaginous mixture is spread on a suitable base and allowed to dry in the dark. A contact negative the same size of the finished print is then placed on top of the dried coating and exposed to an ultraviolet light source, typically bright sunshine.

Often more than one negative is used to provide detail in all tonal ranges. Using multiple exposures requires very careful registration. In exposing the paper, the thinnest parts of the negatives will allow the most exposure and cause the areas to be darker. The densest parts of the negative require more exposure.

The exposed print is then developed gradually in a succession of trays of still water (approximately ten-minute intervals) at room temperature until the bath water is clear. The gum is soft and easily removed at this stage. The negative is then carefully dried until the negative image will be visible as raised areas of clear colourless gum. This surface can then be inked using proprietary oil-based printing ink and impressions made using a simple pressure printing press. Each negative can be made to yield several copies or even copies in different colours. However the fragile nature of the dried gum surface usually will restrict re-use to only one or two copies.

== Gum bichromate ==
Gum bichromate is a 19th-century photographic printing process based on the light sensitivity of dichromates. It is capable of rendering painterly images from photographic negatives. Gum printing is traditionally a multi-layered printing process, but satisfactory results may be obtained from a single pass. Any color can be used for gum printing, so natural-color photographs are also possible by using this technique in layers.

=== Process overview ===
Low density photographic negatives of the same size as the final image are used for exposing the print. No enlarger is used, but instead, a contact printing frame or vacuum exposure frame is used with an ultraviolet light source such as a mercury vapor lamp, a common fluorescent black light, or the sun. Under a mercury vapour lamp the first exposure typically takes between five and fifteen minutes, depending on the negative; later layers, which add pigment for the middle tones, are given shorter exposures. The negative is sandwiched between the prepared paper and a sheet of glass in registration with previous passes.

The print is then floated face down in a bath of room-temperature water to allow the soluble gum, excess dichromate, and pigment to wash away. Several changes of water bath are necessary to clear the print. Afterwards, the print is hung to dry. When all layers are complete and dry, a clearing bath of sodium metabisulfite or potassium metabisulfite is used to extract any remaining dichromate so the print will be archival.

== Contemporary less toxic variants of process ==
- Chiba System

The Chiba System was developed by Norwegian photographer Halvor Bjørngård as part of his 2007 master's thesis at Chiba University.

Inspired by cyanotype, he explored how ammonium ferric citrate (a much safer iron salt) and free radical developers like ammonium persulfate could replace toxic dichromate — and still harden gum arabic with UV light.

- Plant protein based process

The ferric-lupin process was developed by Peter Friedrichsen the naming follows the convention of gum bichromate (the sensitizer and colloid form part of the name) but instead, utilizing a sustainable plant-based protein. It can be hardened in several ways.

- Printmakers Friend - commercial product

PrintMaker's Friend is a synthetic water-soluble photopolymer. It is used as a drop-in substitute for gum arabic and dichromate in gum printing.
