= Maurice Bucquet =

French sports shooter

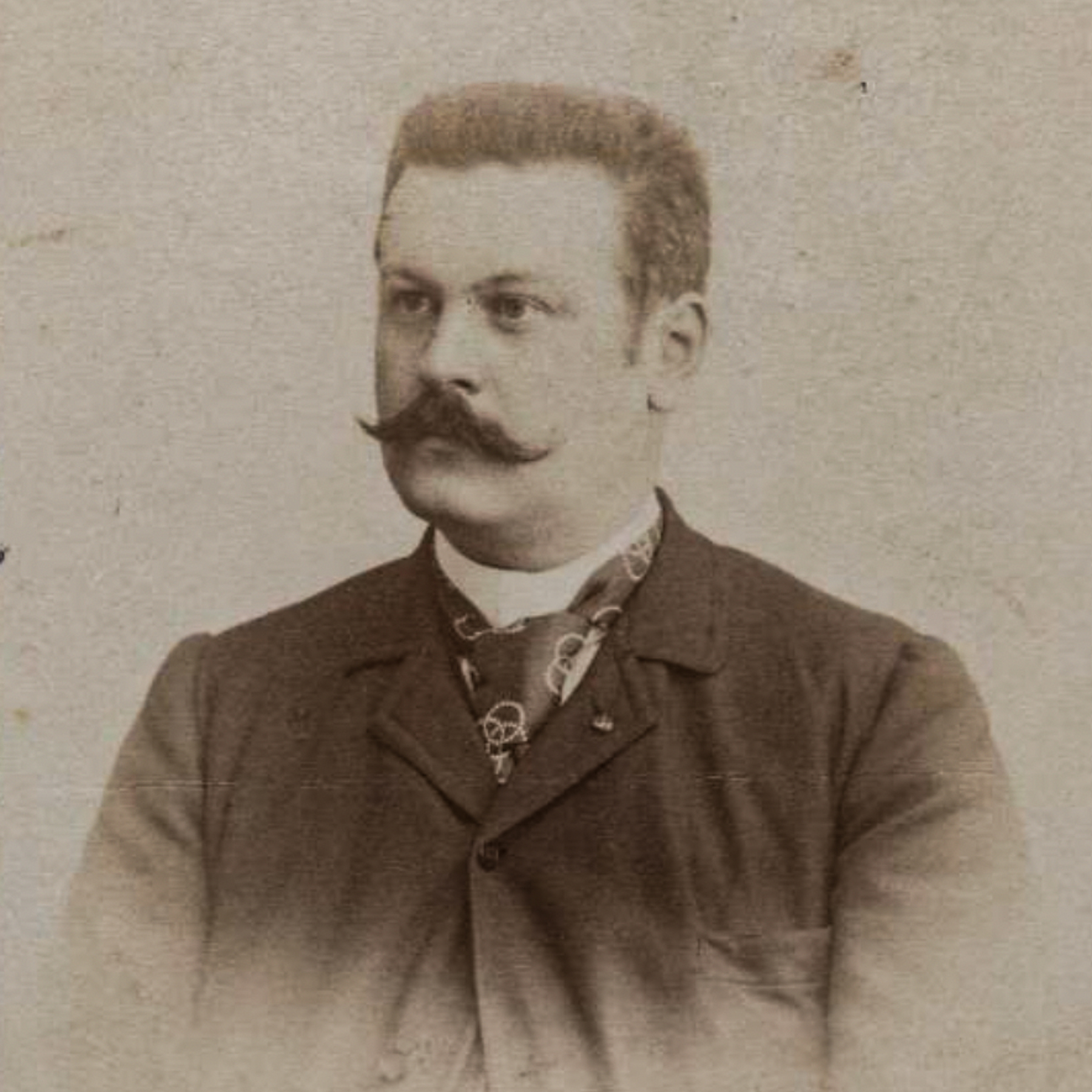

Personal information
- Full name: Jean Paul Maurice Bucquet
- Born: 22 March 1860; Paris, Second French Empire
- Died: 17 February 1921 (aged 60); Paris, France

Sport
- Sport: Sports shooting

Jean Paul Maurice Bucquet (22 March 1860 – 17 February 1921) was a French sports shooter. He competed in the men's trap event at the 1900 Summer Olympics.
