= Constant Puyo =

French photographer (1857–1933)

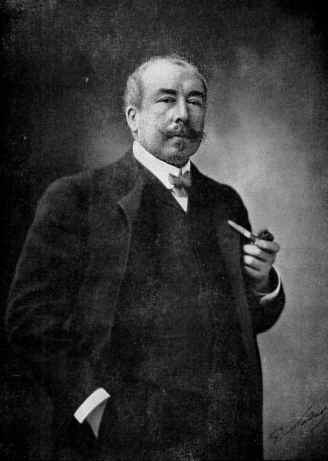
- Puyo, photographed by Nadar
- Born: Émile Joachim Constant Puyo; November 12, 1857; Morlaix, France
- Died: October 6, 1933 (aged 75); Morlaix, France
- Education: École Polytechnique
- Occupations: Soldier, photographer
- Relatives: Tristan Corbière (cousin)

Émile Joachim Constant Puyo (November 12, 1857 – October 6, 1933) was a French photographer, active in the late 19th and early 20th centuries. As the leading advocate of the Pictorialist movement in France, he championed the practice of photography as an artistic medium. For most of his career, Puyo was associated with the Photo Club of Paris, serving as its president from 1921 to 1926. His photographs appeared in numerous publications worldwide, and were exhibited at various expositions in the 1900s.

== Biography ==
Puyo was born to a prominent bourgeois family in Morlaix in 1857. His father, Edmond Puyo (1828–1916), was a painter, amateur archaeologist, and politician, who served as Mayor of Morlaix in the 1870s. His uncle, Édouard Corbière, was a best-selling author, and his cousin, Tristan Corbière, was a well-known poet. Puyo studied at the École Polytechnique before joining the French Army as an artillery officer, rising to the rank of commandant during his career, and commanding a squadron at the School of Artillery at La Fère. He served with the French Army in Algeria during the 1880s.

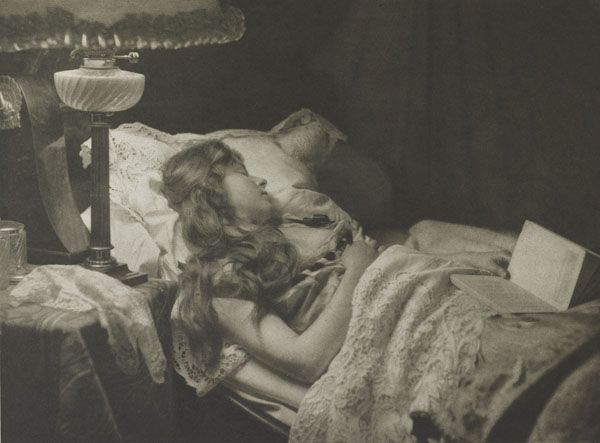
Sommeil (1897)

Puyo began drawing at a young age. Around 1882, he started using cameras to photograph his drawings. Fascinated with cameras, he began using photography to document his various travels in North Africa. By the following decade, he had become one of a growing number of photographers who believed photography was itself a form of high art, in the same manner as other art forms such as painting or sculpture. These photographers formed what became known as the Pictorialist movement.

In 1894, Puyo joined the Photo Club of Paris, which had been founded by Maurice Bacquet, and helped organize a Salon for the club. He wrote several articles for the club's Bulletin, establishing himself as the chief theoretician of the French Pictorialist movement. In 1896, he published his first book, Notes sur la Photographie Artistique, which explained how photography could be used to create works of art.

Following his retirement from the military in 1902, Puyo was able to devote himself more fully to photography. In an effort to achieve greater artistic effects, Puyo and the Photo Club experimented with gum bichromate and oil pigment processes, and developed special soft-focus lenses that achieved impressionistic effects. Puyo wrote or co-wrote several books for the club during this period describing these processes in detail.

After World War I, the decline of Pictorialism in favor of straight, unmanipulated photographs was a source of continuing frustration for Puyo. As president of the Photo Club during the 1920s, he remained passionately dedicated to the Pictorial style.

Puyo retired as Photo Club president in 1926, and returned to his home in Morlaix. He died in 1933, and is interred with his family at the Cemetière Saint-Martin-du-Morlaix.

== Works ==
=== Photographs ===
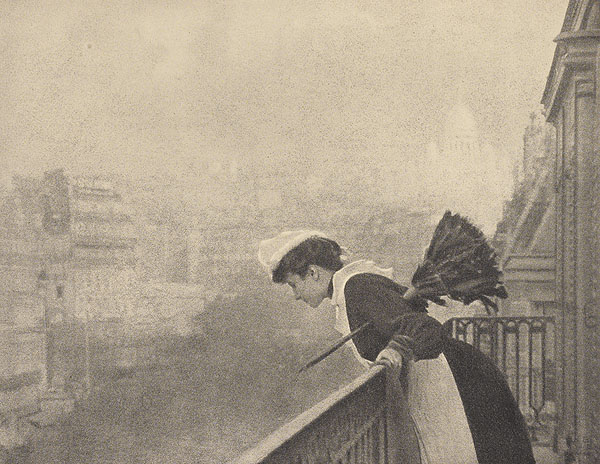
Montmartre (1904)

Puyo believed that for a photograph to be considered art, it must create a beauty independent of the subject, and thus believed art photographers should be more concerned with beauty rather than fact. He considered the manipulation of a photograph to be an expression of individuality, and believed that manipulation was necessary to eliminate the sense that the photograph was produced by an unemotional machine.

Common themes in Puyo's photographs include landscapes, female figures in various poses, and various aspects of late 19th-century Parisian life. He was greatly influenced by artistic movements of the day, especially Impressionism. One of Puyo's better known works, Montmartre, was inspired by Edvard Munch's Rue Lafayette. Art Nouveau patterns appear in many of Puyo's photographs of women.

Puyo's work has been exhibited at museums such as the Metropolitan Museum of Art, the Philadelphia Museum of Art, and the Centre Atlantique de la Photographie in Brest. A large number of Puyo's photographs are on display at the Morlaix Museum, founded by his father in the 1870s.

=== Literature ===
- Notes sur la Photographie Artistique (1896)
- Le Procédé à la Gomme Bichromatée (1904)
- Les Objectifs d'Artiste (1906), coauthored with Jean Leclerc de Pulligny
- Les Procédés d'Art en Photographie (1906), coauthored with Robert Demachy
- Le Procédé Rawlins à l'Huile (1907)
- Comment Composer un Portrait (1925)

== Gallery ==
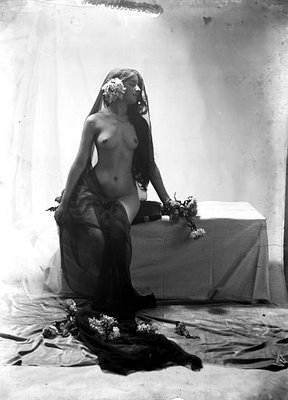

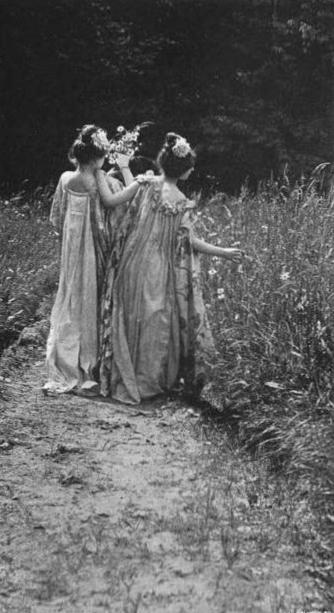

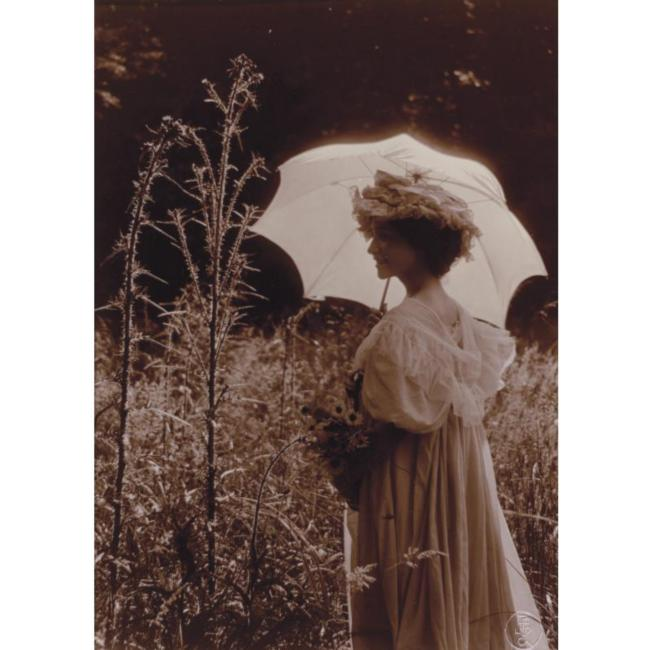

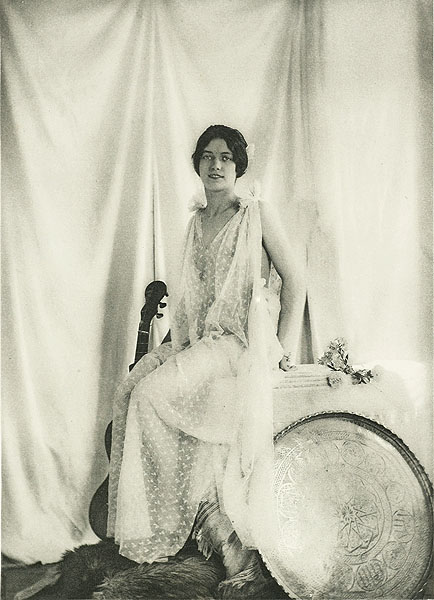

== See also ==
- Pictorialism
- Robert Demachy
- Pierre Dubreuil
- Alfred Horsley Hinton
