= Robert Demachy =

French photographer (1859–1936)

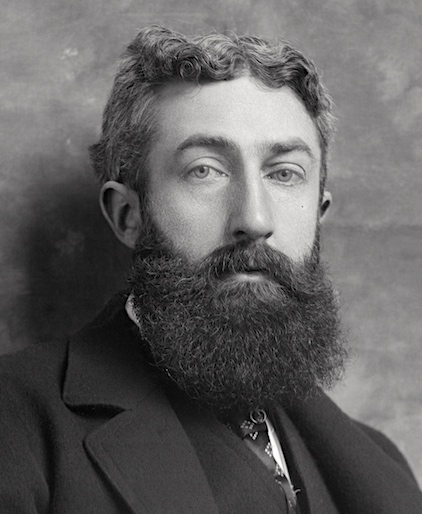
Self portrait c. 1897

Robert Demachy (1859–1936) was a prominent French Pictorial photographer of the late 19th and early 20th century. He is best known for his intensely manipulated prints that display a distinct painterly quality.

== Life ==
=== Early years (1859–1875) ===
Léon-Robert Demachy was born in the home of his grandmother in Saint-Germain-en-Laye, on the outskirts of Paris, on 7 July 1859. His parents, Charles Adolphe Demachy (1818–1888) and Zoé Girod de l’Ain (1827–1916), had two other sons, Charles Amédée (1852–1911) and Adrien Édouard (1854–1927), and a daughter, Germaine (1856-1940?). The elder Charles had started the highly successful financial enterprise of Banque Demachy, and by the time Demachy was born the family was very wealthy. He had no need to earn a living, and there is no record of his having ever been employed anywhere. He dropped the first part of his name in his childhood and was always known as "Robert".

After his birth his family returned to their mansion at 13 Rue François Premier in Paris, where Demachy continued to live for the next fifty years. His early years were quite idyllic, and each year his family would spend several months at their summer villa near Villers-sur-Mer in Normandy. The rest of the year he was educated in Jesuit schools in Paris, and he became fluent in English by the time he was a teenager. His education also included extensive musical lessons, and he became an accomplished violin player.

About 1870, Demachy, his mother and his siblings left Paris for Brussels due to the increasing dangers of the Franco-Prussian War. His father stayed in Paris as part of the Commune and the Banque Demachy played an important role in financing the resistance efforts.

When he turned eighteen Demachy briefly served a year as an army volunteer, but he soon returned to his life of comfort. In the mid-1870s he began frequenting the artists’ cafés and, perhaps in rebellion to his gentrified life, he became involved in the growing bohemian culture that was beginning to take hold in Paris. He began making sketches of café patrons and people on the street, a practice he continued throughout his life.

=== Seminal years (1876–1899) ===
Sometime in the late 1870s he began experimenting with photography. It’s not known what or who influenced him to become involved, but he could devote as much time and money to this endeavor as he wanted and he quickly became highly proficient with a camera. For the next thirty years he devoted all of his time to both taking photographs and writing extensively about photography.

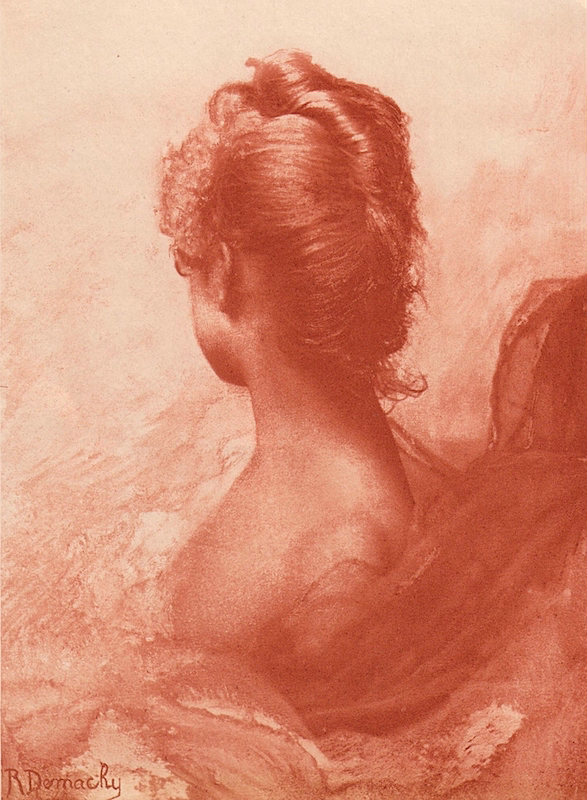
Study in Red - Published in Camera Notes, Vol. 2, No 1, July 1898

In 1882 Demachy was elected to the Société française de photographie, where he interacted with some of the leading photographers in Europe. Within a few years he became frustrated with the conservative views of many of the photographers around him, and in 1888 he joined with Maurice Bucquet to form the new Photo-club de Paris. The members of the Photo-club advocated the aesthetics of Pictorialist photography, and soon the Photo-club was playing a similar role in France as that of the Photo-Secession in the U.S.

In 1889, while visiting the Exposition Universelle in Paris, he met a young woman from Detroit, Michigan, named Julia Adelia Delano. Adelia, as she was called, was a member of the important Delano family in America and a distant relative of future American President Franklin Delano Roosevelt. Little is known about their courtship, but on 2 May 1893 Robert and Adelia were married in Paris. They lived in the family mansion on Rue François Premier. Their first son, Robert-Charles, was born in 1894, followed by son Jacques François in 1898. Jacques later became a very well known fashion illustrator

About 1890 Demachy became one of the first Frenchmen to own an automobile, a Panhard. He owned four of these vehicles throughout his life, keeping the same model until it was old enough to become a classic car.

In 1894 he began to use the gum bichromate printing process recently introduced by A. Rouillé-Ladevèze at the Paris Salon. He developed a style that relied upon heavy manipulation of the image both during the development of the negative and again while printing. As he experimented with the process he wrote about his findings and about the aesthetics of the gum print, helping to popularize it among French photographers. Later that year he, along with Constant Puyo, Le Begue and Bucquet, helped organize the first Paris Salon founded on the artistic principles of the Photo-club de Paris.

In 1895 he had his first exhibition of gum prints at the Photo-club de Paris. This helped to promote his increasingly international status, and later that same year he was elected to The Linked Ring in London.

In 1897 he published his first book, with co-author Alfred Maskell, Photo-aquatint or Gum Bichromate Process (London: Hazell, Watson & Vinery). The photographer Céline Laguarde became a pupil of Demachy around this time .

In 1898 he began corresponding with Stieglitz, often complaining about the lack of true artistic photography in France. The two would continue writing each other for more than fifteen years.

=== Master photographer (1900–1913) ===
During the first decade of the 20th century Demachy continued his extensive writing about photography, and he soon became one of the prolific writers about photography even to this day. Over his lifetime he wrote more than one thousand articles on the aesthetics and techniques of manipulated prints. During this same period Demachy had five exhibitions at the Royal Photographic Society in London:

- April 1901: 67 gum bichromate prints
- June 1904: 80 gum bichromate prints (his first one-man show)
- July 1907: “a small collection” of his experiments with the Rawlins oil process
- July 1910: “a series of photographs from the past six months”
- July 1911: “a collection of oil transfer prints”

At this time a one-man show was a great honor for any photographer, and to have five within a single decade was unprecedented. The critic A.J. Anderson wrote “of a truth, Robert Demachy is not a man, he is a miracle.”

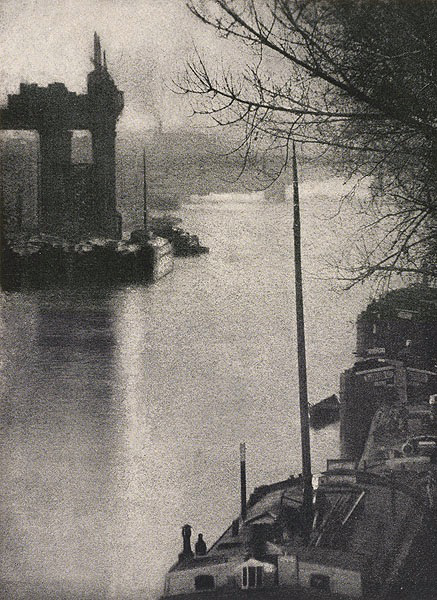
The Seine at Clichy - Published in Camera Work, No 16, October 1906

Each of these shows marked a new high point in his career, and at each he gave an opening address to the membership of the Society. He greatly enjoyed talking about both the technical and aesthetic aspects of his work, and he took advantage of every opportunity to engage other photographers in serious discussions the progress of photography as an art form.

In 1904 six of his photographs, three photogravures and three half-tones were published in Alfred Stieglitz’s famous journal Camera Work, accompanied by a review by Joseph Keiley. These images were seen by American photographer Anne Brigman, who wrote to Stieglitz that they had a serious influence on her own work.

This same year he began experimenting with the Rawlins oil process, a relatively new printing method that allowed extensive reworking of the image. This change allowed him to further blend the aesthetics of a painter with those of a photographer. In his many writings Demachy took great care to point out that just knowing how to use the technique of image manipulation was not enough to automatically make a photograph a work of art. A true artistic photographer, he said, must know "where to put the accents, where to reduce detail and where to subdue or emphasize form, rather than how to do it."

In 1905 Demachy was elected to the Royal Photographic Society. At the invitation of the Society, he and Puyo selected the French entries for the London Photographic Salon that year, and he included more than twenty of his own images in the show.

About 1906 he abandoned gum-bichromate printing altogether in favor of oil printing. With Puyo he wrote and published Procédés d’art en photographie (Paris: Photo-club de Paris).

He continued to explore further ways to manipulate his images, and by 1911 he had perfected the modern bromoil process. This allowed him to become even bolder in his visual style, and soon his works attracted a broad international audience. Over the next two years he exhibited in Paris, Vienna and New York, as well as London.

By 1907 Demachy was so absorbed in his photography that he had a separate studio and living quarters for himself in the upper floor of the family mansion. His wife Adelia had her own quarters on the ground floor, and their children were looked after by an Irish nanny. This situation led to increasing resentment by Adelia, since she was surrounded by Demachy’s mother, her in-laws and her children in their mansion yet she rarely saw her husband because of his preoccupation with photography.

In addition, Adelia thoroughly enjoyed the aristocratic culture surrounding the Demachy family. There were many opportunities to attend elegant parties and events, but for the most part Robert detested them. He preferred the company of bohemian painters or the enjoyment of the simple countryside, and he was not comfortable in higher class social circles. Adelia became more and more isolated, and in 1909 she asked for and was granted a divorce. After the divorce, which was considered scandalous at that time, she moved to her own apartment and remarried two years later. It is reported that Demachy never spoke an unkind word about her either while they were married or after their divorce.

=== Late life (1914–1936) ===
Without notice or explanation, Demachy suddenly gave up taking photographs in early 1914. He never again touched a camera, even refusing to take snapshots of his grandchildren. No one was ever able to extract any reason from him for this sudden change, and it remains a mystery to this day. The timing of his decision coincides with the beginning of World War I in Europe, but there is no indication that he was adversely affected by these events. He continued to make sketches, and at one point he reported that he was amused that he had been questioned as a possible spy when he was drawing pictures near Le Havre. He also exhibited some photographs after 1914 and occasionally wrote brief articles.

When his mother died in 1916, Demachy finally sold the mansion and moved into an apartment at 12 Cité Malesherbes in the old artists' quarter of Montmartre. He also bought a small farm near Hennequeville, near Trouville. He was looked after at both homes by a married butler and housekeeper pair. His only other companions were several Alsatian dogs.

Eventually he moved completely to the farm, where he enjoyed the simple life he preferred. His only artistic endeavor for the rest of his life was driving his classic car to the beach where he made sketches of heavy-set women swimmers in the water.

Demachy died of arteriole sclerosis in Hennequeville, Normandy, on 29 December 1936. He was buried two days later in the family tomb at Père Lachaise Cemetery in Paris.

Just before his death he destroyed most of his sketches and gave any remaining photographs to the Royal Photographic Society and the Photo-club de Paris.

The Banque Demachy still exists today but is no longer connected to the original family. The family mansion at 13 Rue François Premier was for many years the Paris headquarters of Christian Dior.

== Gallery ==
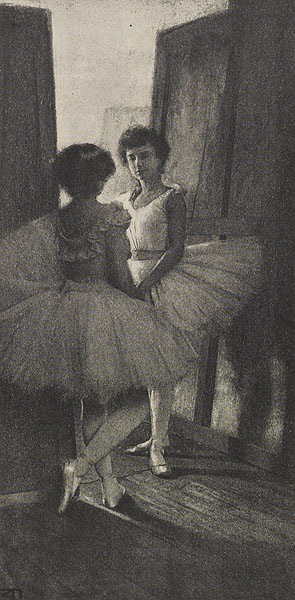
Behind the Scenes, 1904

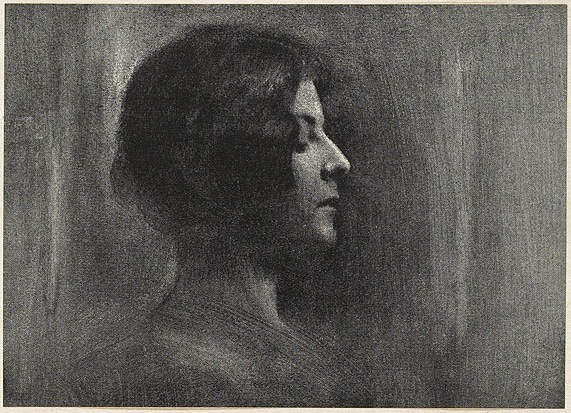
Severity, 1904

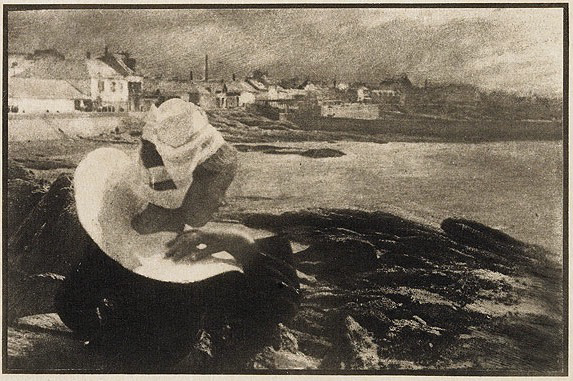
In Brittany, 1904

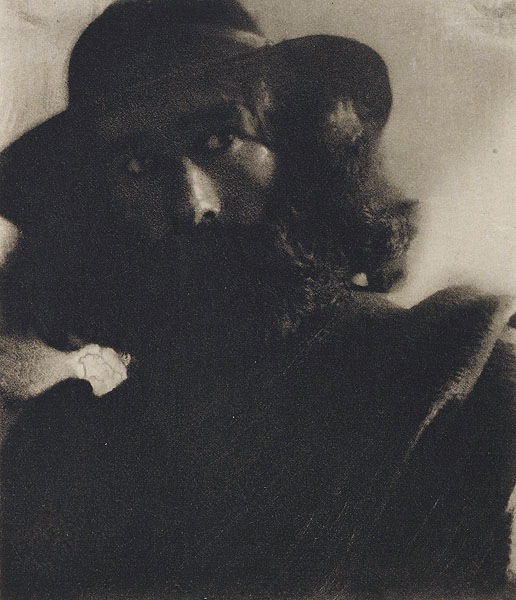
A Model, 1906

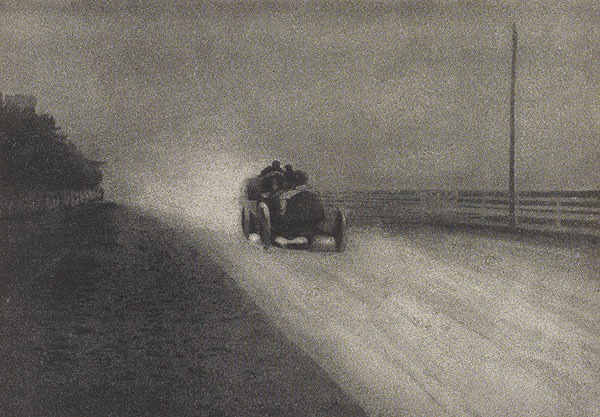
Speed, 1904

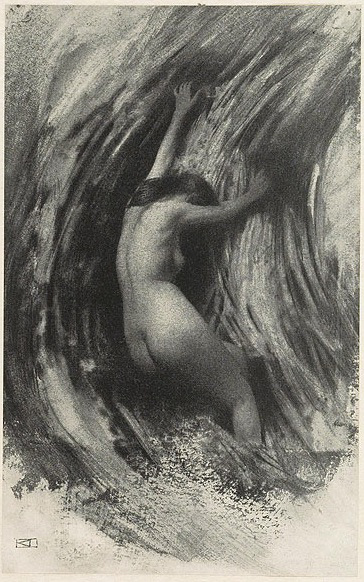
Struggle, 1904

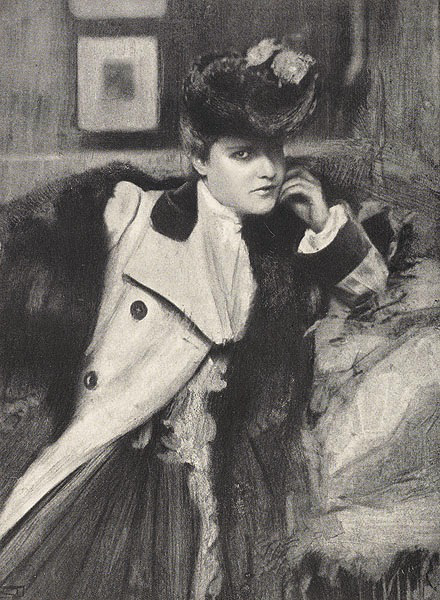
Portrait - Mlle D., 1906

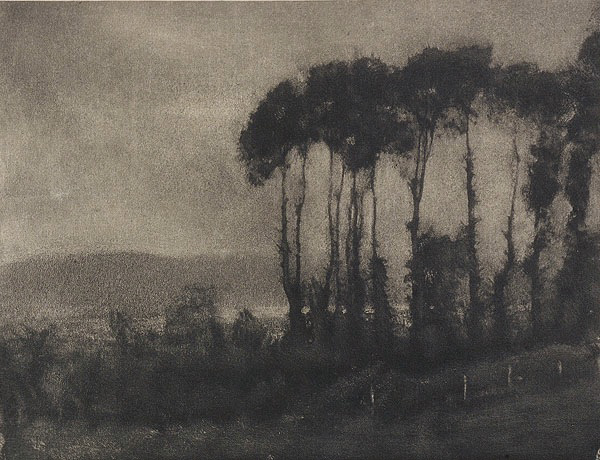
Toucques Valley, 1906
