= Käsebier =

Käsebier is a surname of German origin. Notable people with the surname include:

- Christian Andreas Käsebier (c. 1710 – after 1757), German criminal and spy
- Dirk Käsebier (born 1966), German boxer
- Gertrude Käsebier (1852–1934), American photographer

== See also ==
- Nate Kazebier (1912–1969), American jazz musician
