= The Stolen Battle =

- Directed by: Erwin Stranka
- Starring: Manfred Krug
- Music by: Zdeněk Liška
- Release date: 1972

The Stolen Battle (Czech: Ukradená bitva; German: Die gestohlene Schlacht) is a 1972 East-German/Czechoslovak film based on the life of Christian Andreas Käsebier. The film starred Manfred Krug as Käsebier and Josef Kemr as Karl von Lothringen.
