= Blessed Art Thou Among Women =

Photograph by Gertrude Käsebier

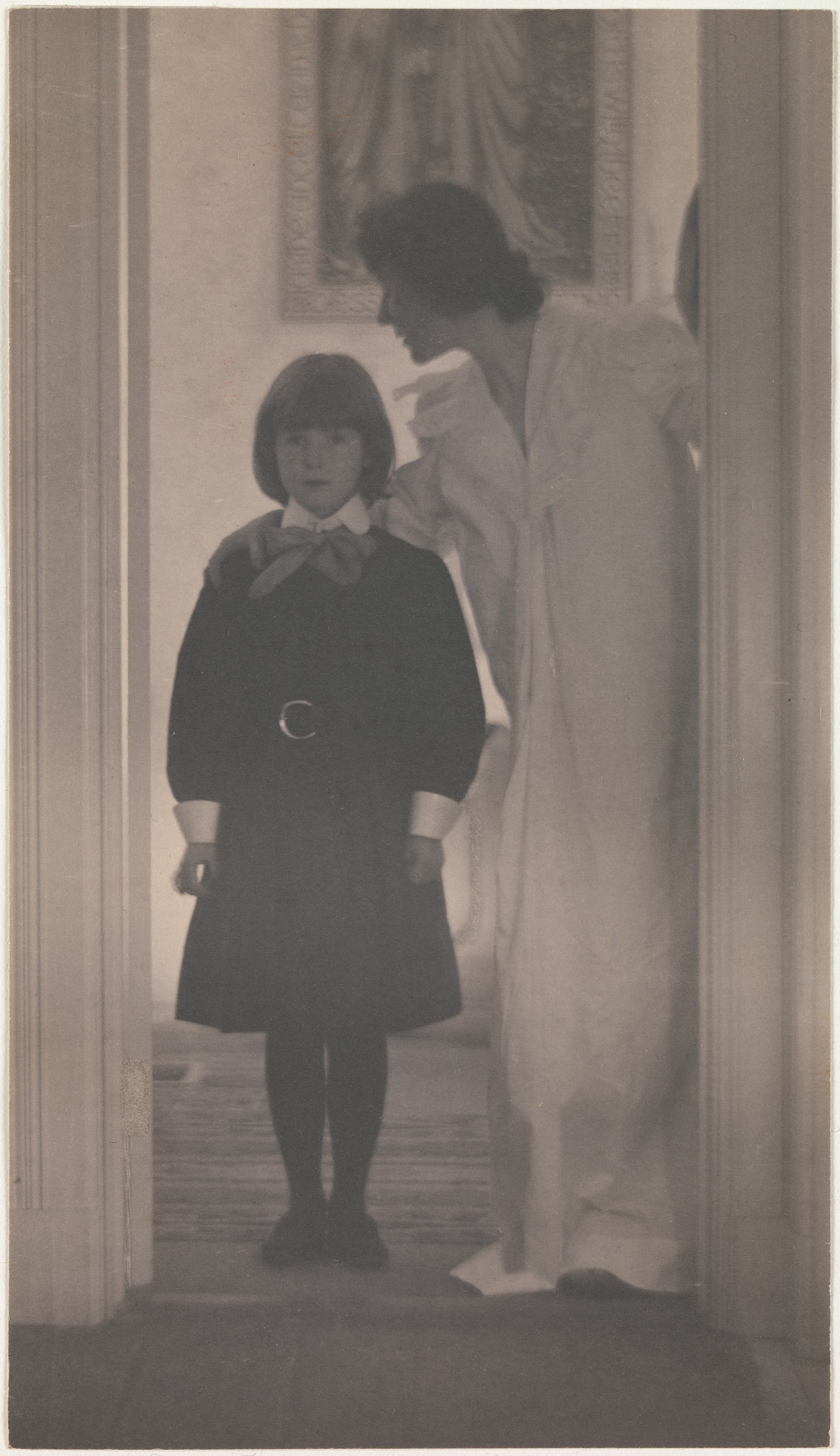
Blessed Art Thou Among Women (1899)

Blessed Art Thou Among Women is a photograph by American photographer Gertrude Käsebier. It was taken in 1899, and depicts poet Agnes Rand Lee and her elder daughter Harriet "Peggy" Lee in their home in Jamaica Plain, Massachusetts. The photograph is an example of the many images Käsebier created of the bond between mother and child. The work exemplifies the chiaroscuro and atmospheric quality of light in Käsebier's photographs. Käsebier was so unhappy with her own marriage that she spent many years separated from her husband. Her objections to the institution of marriage seem inconsistent with the gendered view of woman as caretaker reflected in Blessed Art Thou.

Käsebier believed that photography was a means for women to achieve financial independence. Among women photographers inspired by her work were Consuelo Kanaga. In 1899 Alfred Stieglitz published five of Kasabier's photographs in Camera Notes and wrote that she was "beyond dispute, the leading artistic portrait photographer of the Day." In 1899 her print of The Manger, also an image of a mother and child, sold for $100 — the most ever paid for a photograph at that time. Käsebier's financial need for commercial success to support her family created a rift with Stieglitz. Käsebier's gendered images like Blessed Art Thou and The Manger were made at a time where she was in her personal quest for professional and financial independence.
