= Siege of Prague =

1757 siege of the Seven Years' War

- Part of the Third Silesian War (Seven Years' War)
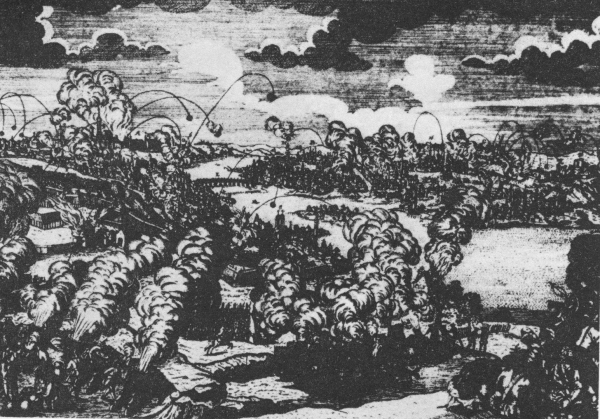
Date	May–June 1757
Location	Prague, Bohemia 50°05′00″N 14°25′00″E

Belligerents
Prussia	Austria

Strength
	40,000

The Siege of Prague was an unsuccessful attempt by a Prussian army led by Frederick the Great to capture the Bohemian city of Prague during the Third Silesian War (Seven Years' War). It took place in May 1757 immediately after the Battle of Prague. Despite having won that battle, Frederick had lost 14,300 dead, and his severely depleted force was not strong enough to assault Prague. Instead Frederick decided to besiege the city, hoping to force it into submission through lack of supplies. 40,000 Austrian troops were trapped in the city, though they were themselves not strong enough to consider launching a sortie. Frederick attempted to gain intelligence from within Prague by sending the criminal Christian Andreas Käsebier several times into the besieged city.

An Austrian army led by the Count von Daun made a sudden march to the north, threatening Frederick's lines of supply, and he was forced to break off the siege and march to attack them. Frederick was defeated at the Battle of Kolín and his force was now too weak to contemplate continuing the siege of Prague, and he was forced to withdraw from Bohemia entirely. It marked a high-water mark for the Prussians, as they would never hold so advantageous a position again and most of the remainder of the war would be fought on their own territory. In spite of this the Prussians attempted another invasion of Austrian territory the following year which culminated in a failed attempt to take Olomouc.

== Bibliography ==
- Anderson, Fred. Crucible of War: The Seven Years' War and the Fate of Empire in British North America, 1754–1766. Faber and Faber, 2001
- Simms, Brendan. Three Victories and a Defeat: The Rise and Fall of the First British Empire. Penguin Books (2008)
