= Florence Maynard =

American photographer (1867–1958)

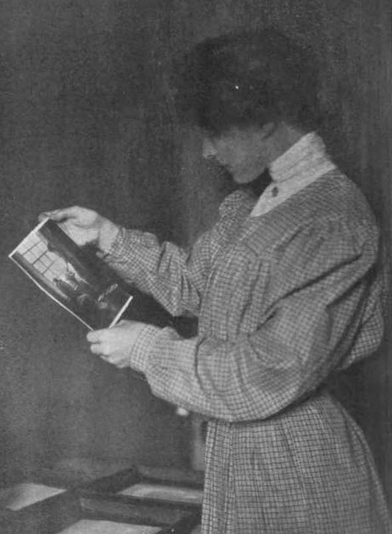
Florence Maynard, photographed by her brother Karl Maynard, from a 1911 publication.

Florence Maynard (May 6, 1867 – 1958) was an American photographer. She has portraits in several American collections.

== Early life ==
Florence Maynard was born in Chicago, Illinois, the daughter of Otis Riley Maynard and Minerva Bowen Maynard. She was raised in Massachusetts and trained as a painter in Boston. She began to study photography while in art school, working as an assistant to Gertrude Käsebier.

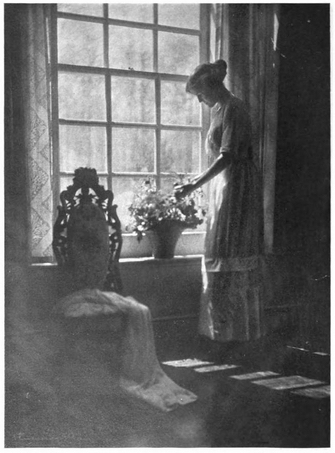
"A Side-Light Portrait" by Florence Maynard, from a 1911 publication.

== Career ==
Maynard specialized in portraits, but was also known for scenic photography. She worked with her brother, Karl Maynard (1874–1951), in their studio in West Philadelphia. They had a studio in the Boston area, and published photographic postcards of New England scenes. Florence Maynard also worked in New York City. "I am more and more convinced that the best results in portraiture can be had in the familiar surroundings of the sitters' own homes, and practically all of my work is done that way," she explained in a 1911 profile.

Maynard served on the board of the Photographic Guild of the Boston Society of Arts and Crafts, and was among the vocational advisors to the Women's Educational and Industrial Union in their annual reports from 1917 to 1921. She was elected as one of the vice-presidents of the Women's Christian Temperance Union chapter in Newton, Massachusetts in 1927.

== Personal life and legacy ==
Maynard was superintendent of the Sunday School at the First Church of Christ, Scientist, in Newton, Massachusetts. She died in 1958, aged 90 years, in Massachusetts. A photograph by Florence Maynard is in the collection of the J. Paul Getty Museum. Another photograph by Maynard is in the collection of the Wheelwright Museum of the American Indian. The Boston Athenaeum has four portraits of George Alexander Philips Haldane, the fourth Earl of Camperdown, taken in about 1920 by Florence Maynard. The MIT Museum holds a Maynard portrait of architect Lois Lilley Howe.
