= Gertrude Käsebier =

American photographer (1852–1934)

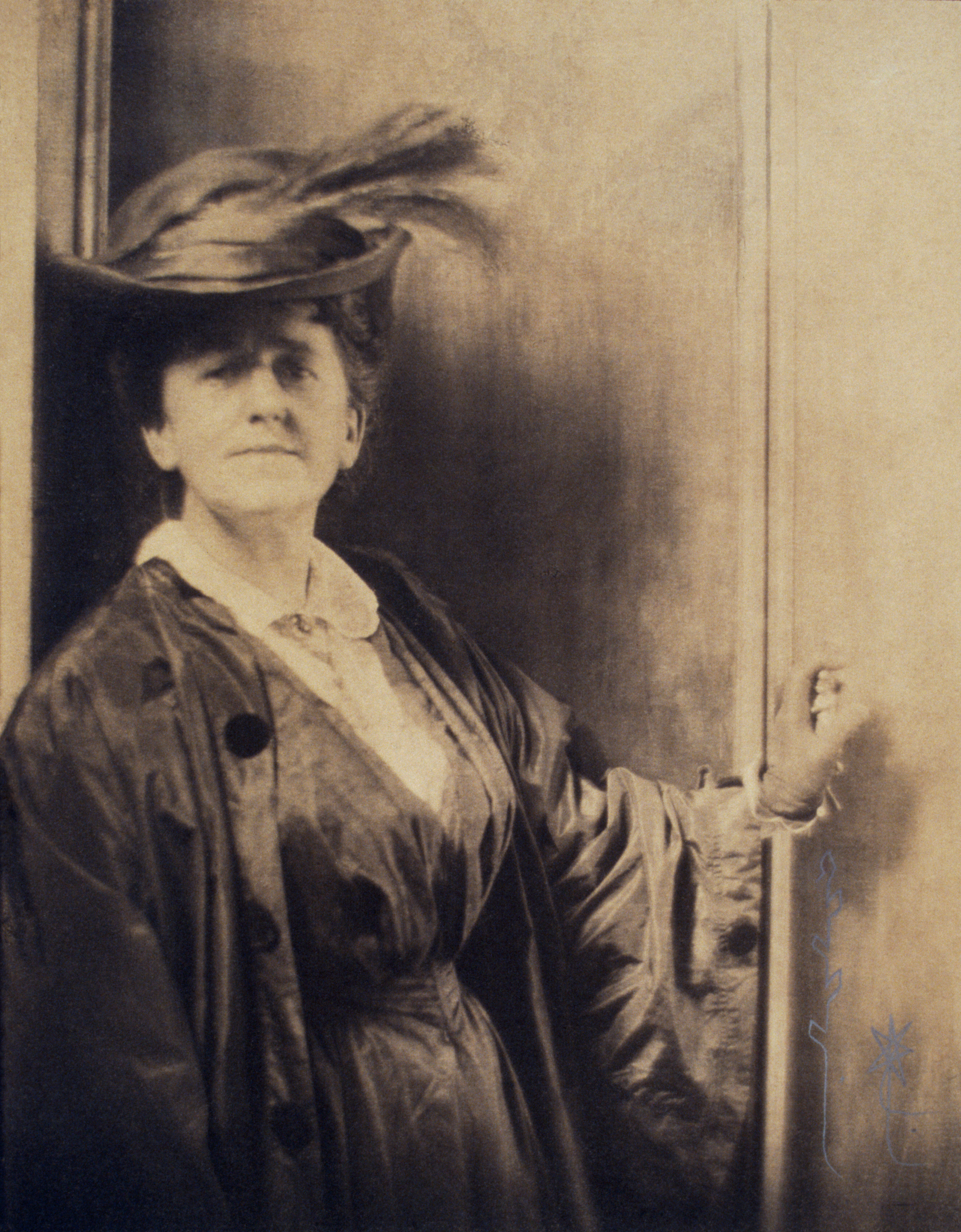
- Portrait by Adolf de Meyer, c. 1900
- Born: Gertrude Stanton; May 18, 1852; Des Moines, Iowa, U.S.
- Died: October 12, 1934 (aged 82); New York City, U.S.

Gertrude Käsebier (born Stanton; May 18, 1852 – October 12, 1934) was an American photographer. She was known for her images of motherhood, her portraits of Native Americans, and her promotion of photography as a career for women.

== Biography ==
=== Early life (1852–1873) ===
Käsebier was born Gertrude Stanton on May 18, 1852, in Fort Des Moines (now Des Moines, Iowa). Her mother was Muncy Boone Stanton and her father was John W. Stanton. He transported a saw mill to Golden, Colorado, at the start of the Pike's Peak Gold Rush of 1859, and he prospered from the building boom that followed. In 1860, eight-year-old Stanton traveled with her mother and younger brother to join her father in Colorado. That same year, her father was elected the first mayor of Golden, which was then the capital of the Colorado Territory. During her four years in Colorado, she developed an interest in and affection for Native Americans. She would visit with them, and then be returned to her home.

Her father died suddenly in 1864 and afterward the family moved to Brooklyn, New York, where her mother, Muncy Boone Stanton, opened a boarding house to support the family. From 1866 to 1870, Stanton lived in Bethlehem, Pennsylvania, with her maternal grandmother and she attended the Bethlehem Female Seminary (later Moravian College). Little else is known about her early years.

=== Becoming a photographer (1874–1897) ===
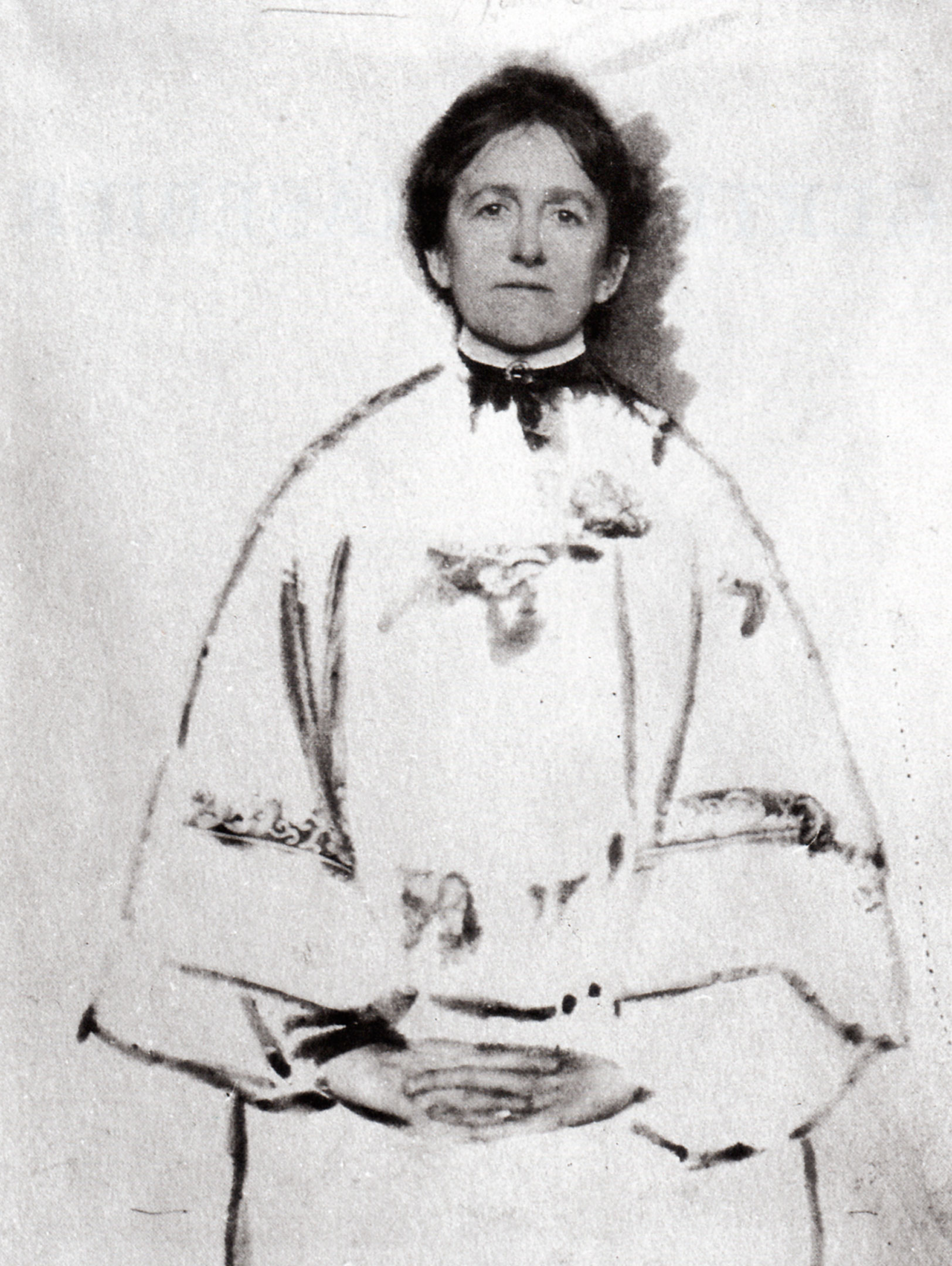
Portrait of the Photographer, a manipulated self-portrait by Gertrude Käsebier

On her 22nd birthday, in 1874, she married 28-year-old Eduard Käsebier, a financially comfortable and socially well-placed businessman in Brooklyn. The couple soon had three children, Frederick William (1875–1935), Gertrude Elizabeth (1878–?), and Hermine Mathilde (1880–?). In 1884, they moved to a farm in New Durham, New Jersey, for a healthier environment in which to raise their children.

Käsebier later wrote that she was miserable throughout most of her marriage. She said "If my husband has gone to Heaven, I want to go to Hell. He was terrible... Nothing was ever good enough for him." At that time, divorce was considered scandalous, and the two remained married while living separate lives after 1880. This unhappy situation later served as an inspiration for one of her most strikingly titled photographs – two constrained oxen, titled Yoked and Muzzled – Marriage (c. 1915).

In spite of their differences, her husband supported her financially when she began to attend art school at the age of 37, a time when most women of her day were well-settled in their social positions. Käsebier never indicated what motivated her to study art, but she devoted herself to it wholeheartedly. Over the objections of her husband, in 1889, she moved the family back to Brooklyn to attend the newly established Pratt Institute of Art and Design full-time. One of her teachers there was Arthur Wesley Dow, a highly influential artist and art educator. He later helped promote her career by writing about her work and by introducing her to other photographers and patrons.

While at Pratt, Käsebier learned about the theories of Friedrich Fröbel, a 19th-century scholar whose ideas about learning, play, and education led to the development of the first kindergarten. His concepts about the importance of motherhood in child development greatly influenced Käsebier, and many of her later photographs emphasized the bond between mother and child. She was also influenced by the Arts and Crafts movement.

She formally studied drawing and painting, but she quickly became obsessed with photography. Like many art students of that time, Käsebier decided to travel to Europe to further her education. She began 1894 by spending several weeks studying the chemistry of photography in Germany, where she was able to leave her daughters with in-laws in Wiesbaden. She spent the rest of the year in France, studying with American painter Frank DuMond.

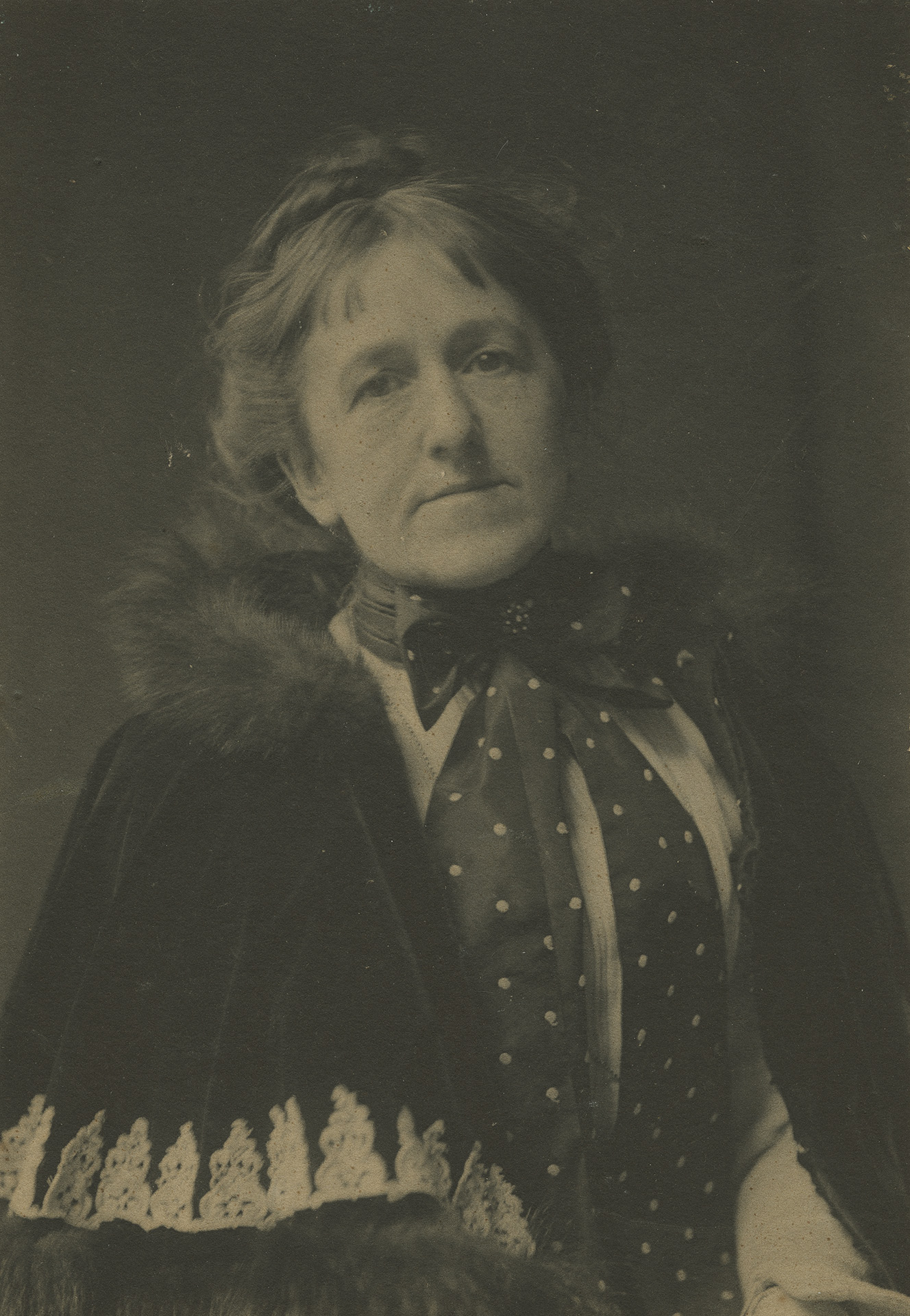
Gertrude Käsebier, c. 1900, platinum print by Samuel H. Lifshey, Department of Image Collections, National Gallery of Art Library, Washington, D.C.

In 1895, she returned to Brooklyn. In part because her husband had become quite ill and her family's finances were strained, she determined to become a professional photographer. A year later, she became an assistant to Brooklyn portrait photographer Samuel H. Lifshey, where she learned how to run a studio and expand her knowledge of printing techniques. See here for example. Clearly, however, by this time, she had an extensive mastery of photography. Just one year later, she exhibited 150 photographs at the Boston Camera Club, an enormous number for an individual artist at the time. These same photographs were shown in February 1897 at the Pratt Institute.

The success of these shows led to another at the Photographic Society of Philadelphia in 1897. She also lectured on her work there and encouraged other women to take up photography as a career, saying "I earnestly advise women of artistic tastes to train for the unworked field of modern photography. It seems to be especially adapted to them, and the few who have entered it are meeting a gratifying and profitable success."

=== Gertrude Käsebier and the Sioux ===
In 1898, Käsebier watched Buffalo Bill's Wild West troupe parade past her Fifth Avenue studio in New York City, toward Madison Square Garden. Her memories of affection and respect for the Lakota people inspired her to send a letter to William "Buffalo Bill" Cody requesting permission to photograph the members of the Sioux tribe traveling with the show in her studio. Cody and Käsebier were similar in their abiding respect for Native American culture and maintained friendships with the Sioux. Cody quickly approved Käsebier's request and she began her project on Sunday morning, April 14, 1898. Käsebier's project was purely artistic and her images were not made for commercial purposes. They never were used in Buffalo Bill's Wild West program booklets or promotional posters. Käsebier took classic photographs of the Sioux while they were relaxed. Chief Iron Tail and Chief Flying Hawk were among Käsebier's most challenging and revealing portraits. Käsebier's photographs are preserved at the National Museum of American History's Photographic History Collection at the Smithsonian Institution.

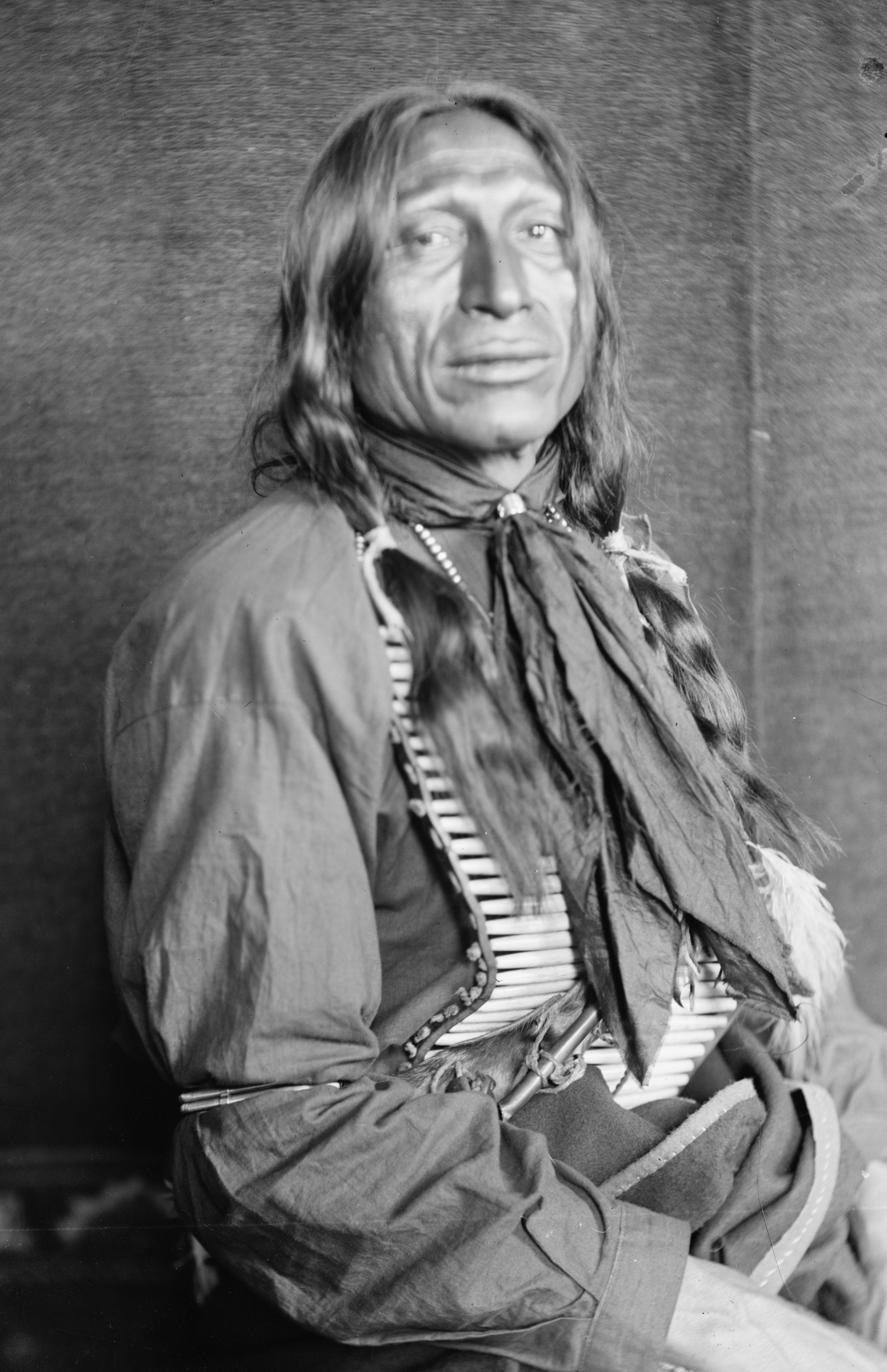
Chief Iron Tail, Gertrude Kasebier, 1898, U.S. Library of Congress

Käsebier's session with Iron Tail was her only recorded story: "Preparing for their visit to Käsebier's photography studio, the Sioux at Buffalo Bill's Wild West Camp met to distribute their finest clothing and accessories to those chosen to be photographed." Käsebier admired their efforts, but desired to, in her own words, photograph a "real raw Indian, the kind I used to see when I was a child", referring to her early years in Colorado and on the Great Plains. Käsebier selected one Indian, Iron Tail, to approach for a photograph without regalia. "He did not object. The resulting photograph was exactly what Käsebier had envisioned: a relaxed, intimate, quiet, and beautiful portrait of the man, devoid of decoration and finery, presenting himself to her and the camera without barriers." Several days later, Chief Iron Tail was given the photograph and he immediately tore it up, stating that it was too dark. Käsebier photographed him again, this time in his full regalia. Iron Tail was an international celebrity. He appeared with his fine regalia as the lead with Buffalo Bill at the Avenue des Champs-Élysées in Paris, France and the Colosseum of Rome. Iron Tail was a superb showman and disliked the photograph of him relaxed, but Käsebier chose it as the frontispiece for an article in the 1901 Everybody's Magazine. Käsebier believed all the portraits were a "revelation of Indian character", showing the strength and individual character of the Native Americans in "new phases for the Sioux".

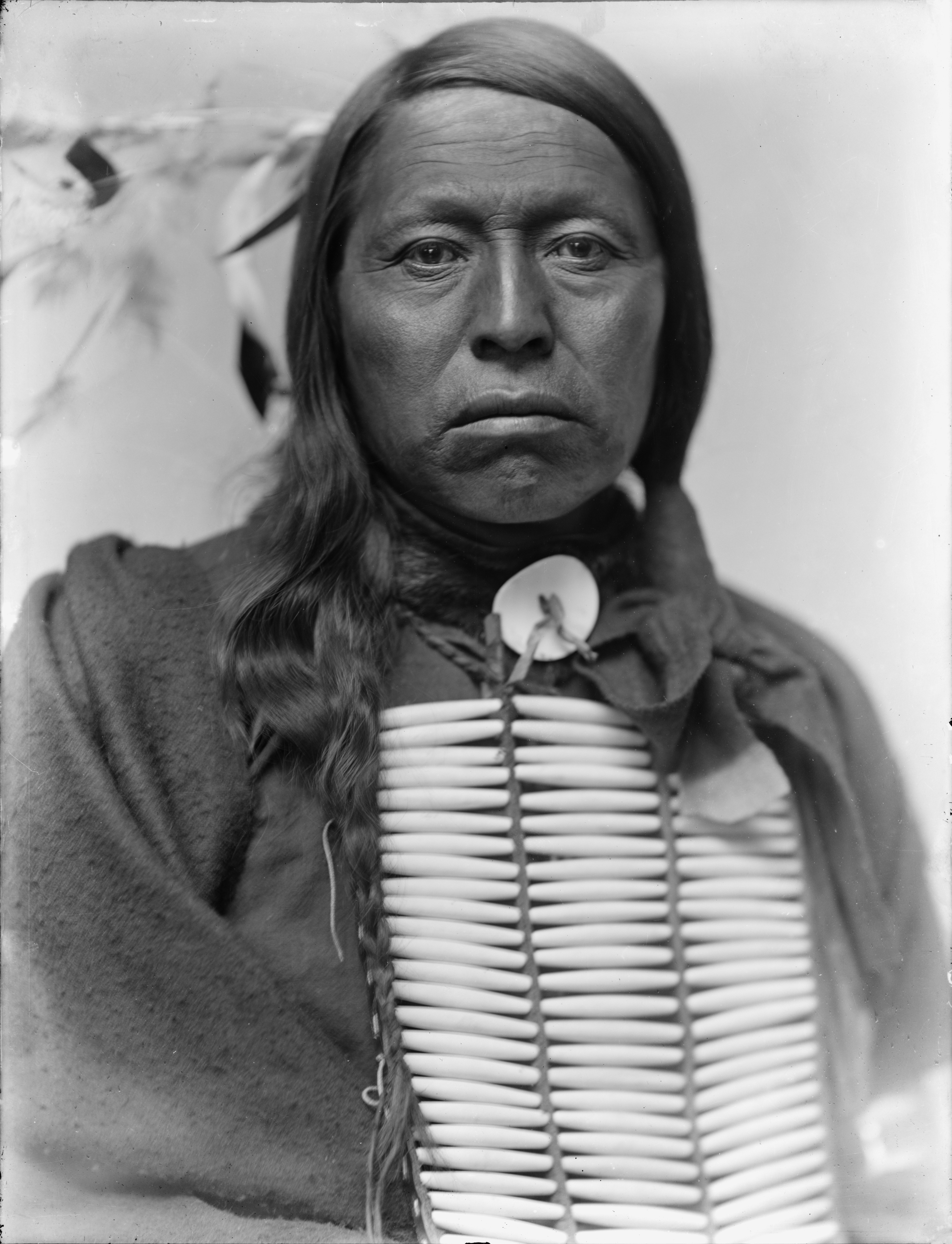
Chief Flying Hawk, Gertrude Kasebier, 1898, U.S. Library of Congress

In her photograph of Chief Flying Hawk, his glare is the most startling image among those portraits by Käsebier, quite contrary to the others who were shown as relaxed, smiling, or making a "noble pose". Flying Hawk was a combatant in nearly all of the fights with United States troops during the Great Sioux War of 1876. He fought along with his cousin Crazy Horse and his brothers Kicking Bear and Black Fox II in the Battle of the Little Big Horn in 1876. He was present at the death of Crazy Horse in 1877 and the Wounded Knee Massacre of 1890. In 1898, when the portrait was taken, Flying Hawk was new to show business and he was unable to hide his anger and frustration about having to imitate battle scenes from the Great Plains Wars for Buffalo Bill's Wild West in order to escape the constraints and poverty of the Indian reservation. Soon, Flying Hawk learned to appreciate the benefits of a Show Indian with Buffalo Bill's Wild West. Flying Hawk regularly circulated show grounds in full regalia and sold his "cast card" picture postcards for a penny to promote the show and to supplement his meager income. After the death of Iron Tail on May 28, 1916, Flying Hawk was chosen as his successor by all of the braves of Buffalo Bill's Wild West and he led the gala processions as the head Chief of the Indians.

=== Height of her career (1898–1909) ===
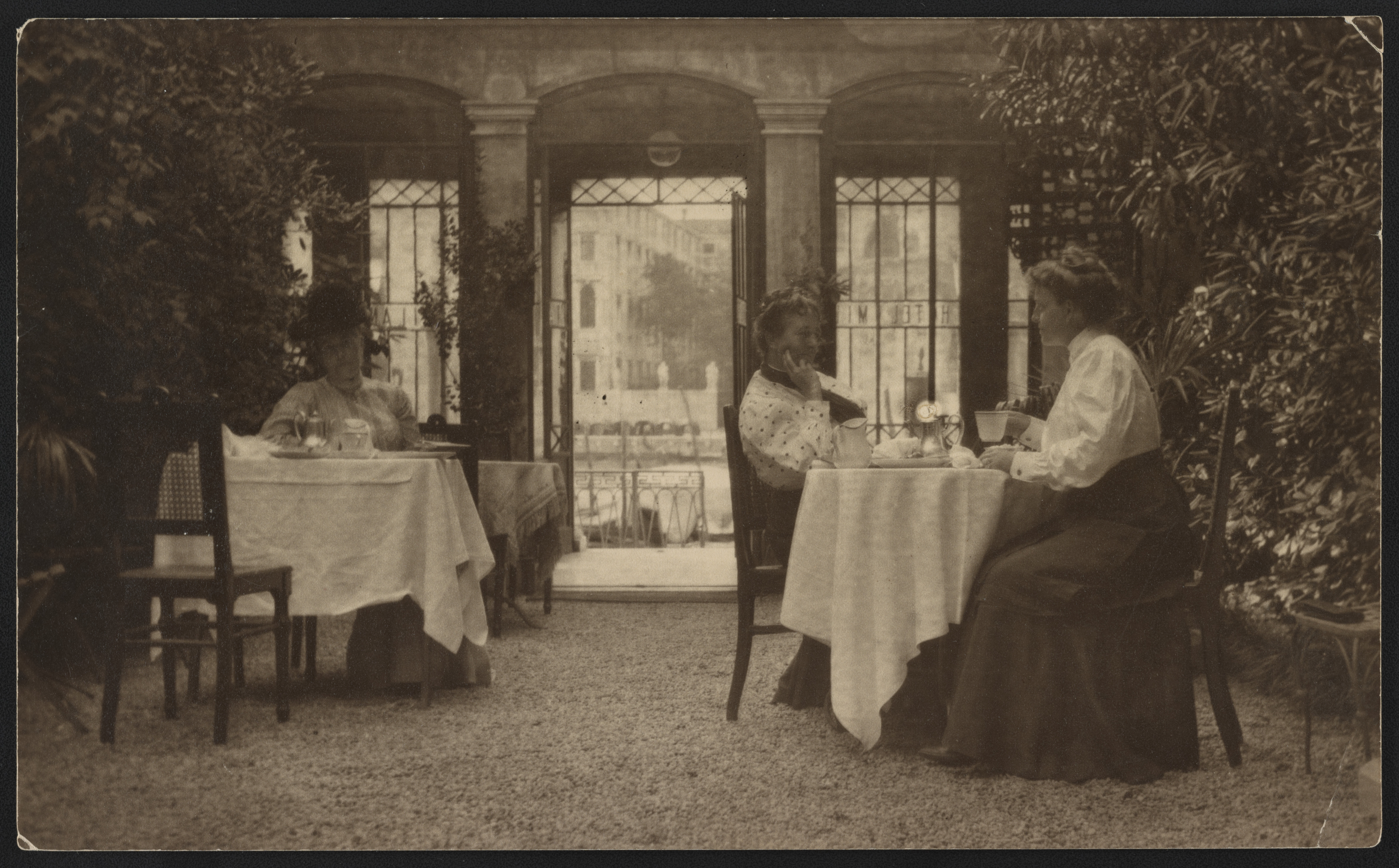
Portrait of photographers Frances Benjamin Johnston and Gertrude Käsebier on the patio of a hotel in Venice, Italy, 1905

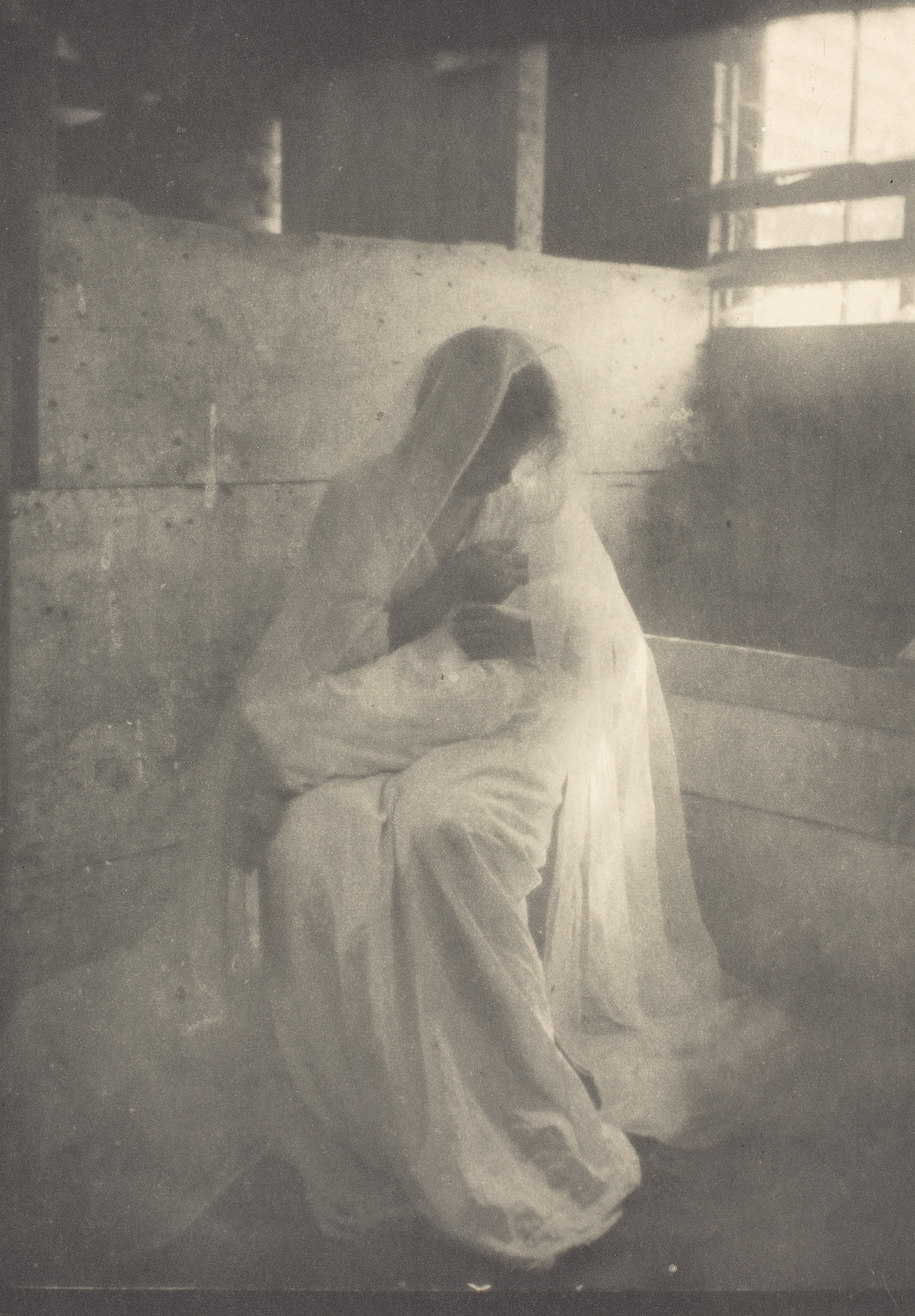
The Manger, c. 1900, National Gallery of Art

Over the next decade, she took dozens of photographs of the Indians in the show. Some of those photographs become her more famous images.

Unlike Edward Curtis, a photographer who was her contemporary, Käsebier focused more on the expression and individuality of the person than their costumes and customs. While Curtis is known to have added elements to his photographs to emphasize his personal vision, Käsebier did the opposite, sometimes removing genuine ceremonial articles from a sitter to concentrate on the face or stature of the person.

In July 1899, Alfred Stieglitz published five of Käsebier's photographs in Camera Notes, declaring her "beyond dispute, the leading artistic portrait photographer of the day". Her rapid rise to fame was noted by photographer and critic Joseph Keiley, who wrote "a year ago Käsebier's name was practically unknown in the photographic world... Today that names stands first and unrivaled...". That same year her print of "The Manger" sold for $100, the most ever paid for a photograph at that time.

In 1900, Käsebier continued to gather accolades and professional praise. In the catalog for the Newark (Ohio) Photography Salon, she was called "the foremost professional photographer in the United States". In recognition of her artistic accomplishments and her stature, later that year, Käsebier was one of the first two women elected to Britain's Linked Ring (the other was British pictorialist Carine Cadby).

The next year, Charles H. Caffin published his landmark book Photography as a Fine Art and devoted an entire chapter to the work of Käsebier ("Gertrude Käsebier and the Artistic Commercial Portrait"). Due to demand for her artistic opinions in Europe, Käsebier spent most of the year in Britain and France visiting with F. Holland Day and Edward Steichen.

In 1902, Stieglitz included Käsebier as a founding member of the Photo-Secession. The following year, Stieglitz published six of her images in the first issue of Camera Work. They were accompanied by highly complementary articles by Charles Caffin and Frances Benjamin Johnston. In 1905 six more of her images were published in Camera Work, and the following year, Stieglitz presented an exhibition of Käsebier photographs (along with those of Clarence H. White) at his Little Galleries of the Photo-Secession.

The strain of balancing her professional life with her personal one began to take a toll on Käsebier at this time. The stress was exacerbated by her husband's decision to move to Oceanside, Long Island, which had the effect of distancing her from the New York artistic center. In response, she returned to Europe where, through connections provided by Steichen, she was able to photograph the reclusive Auguste Rodin.

When Käsebier returned to New York an unexpected conflict with Stieglitz developed. Käsebier's strong interest in the commercial side of photography, driven by her need to support her husband and family, was directly at odds with Stieglitz's idealistic and antimaterialistic nature. The more Käsebier enjoyed commercial success, the more Stieglitz felt she was going against what he felt a true artist should emulate. In May 1906, Käsebier joined the Professional Photographers of New York, a newly formed organization that Stieglitz saw as standing for everything he disliked: commercialism and the selling of photographs commercially rather than for love of the art. After this, he began distancing himself from Käsebier. Their relationship never regained its previous status of mutual artistic admiration.

=== Professional independence (1910–1934) ===
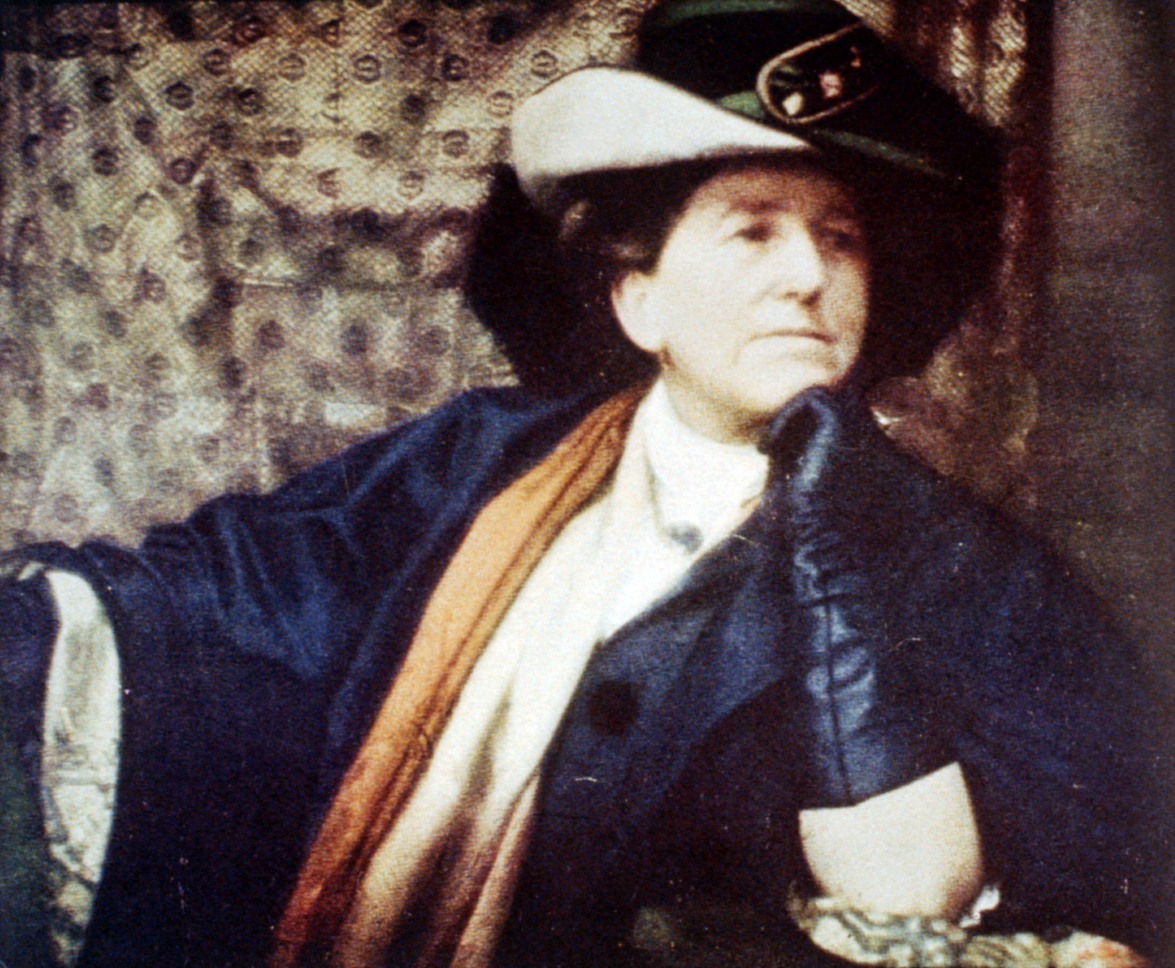
Käsebier in 1908

Eduard Käsebier died in 1910, finally leaving his wife free to pursue her interests as she saw fit. She continued to follow a separate course from that of Stieglitz and helped to establish the Women's Professional Photographers Association of America. In turn, Stieglitz began to publicly speak against her contemporary work, but he still thought enough of her earlier images to include 22 of them in the landmark exhibition of pictorialists at the Albright-Knox Art Gallery later that year.

The next year, Käsebier was shocked by a highly critical attack made by Joseph T. Keiley, her former admirer, that was published in Stieglitz's Camera Work. Why Keiley suddenly changed his opinion of her is unknown, but Käsebier suspected that Stieglitz had put him up to it.

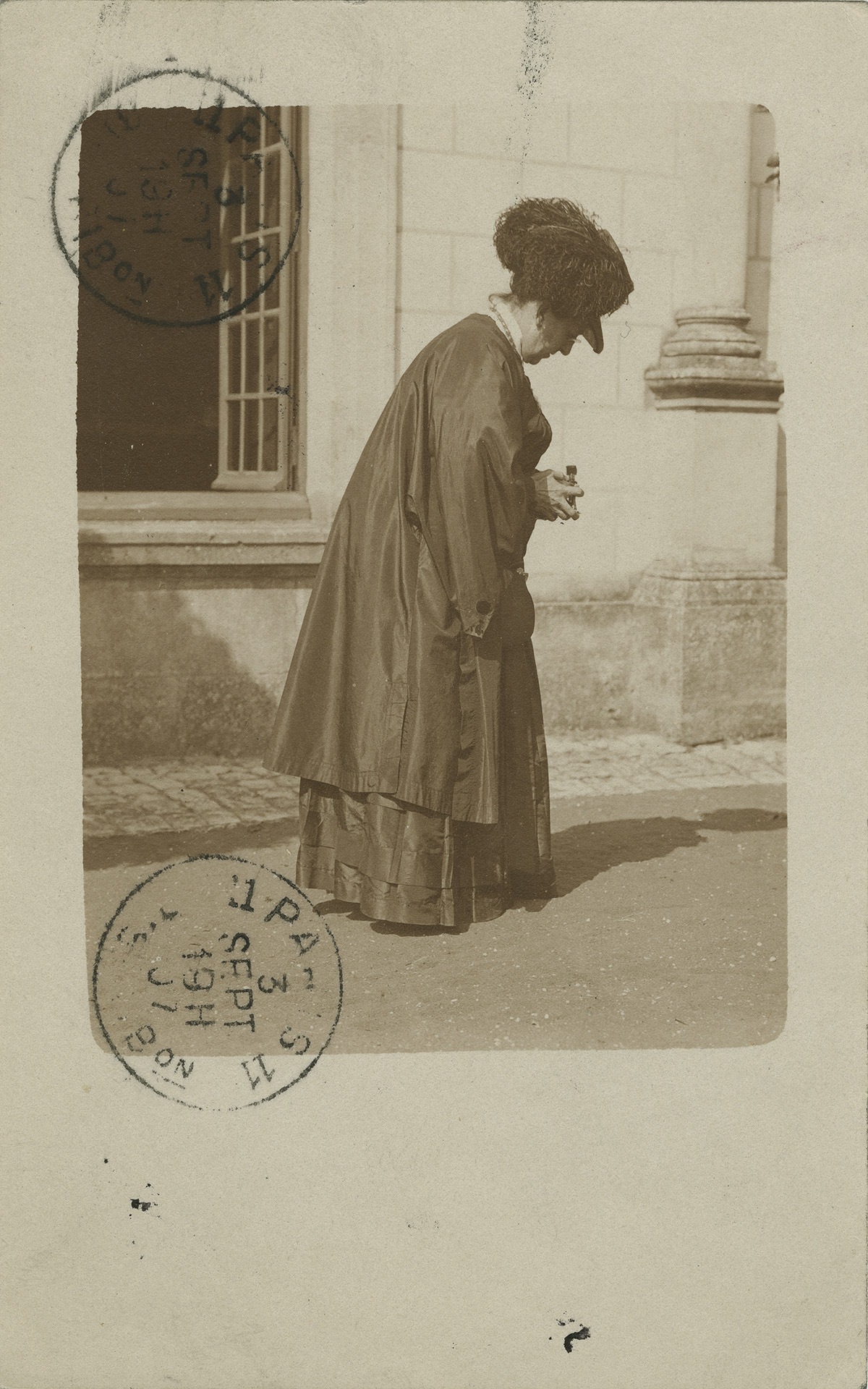
Gertrude Käsebier with hand-held camera, 1907, gelatin print postcard, Department of Image Collections, National Gallery of Art Library, Washington, D.C.

Part of Käsebier's alienation from Stieglitz was due to his stubborn resistance to the idea of gaining financial success from artistic photography. If he felt a buyer truly appreciated the art, he often sold original prints by Käsebier and others at far less than their market value, and when he did sell prints, he took many months before paying the photographer of the work. After several years of protesting these practices, in 1912, Käsebier became the first member to resign from the Photo-Secession.

In 1916, Käsebier helped Clarence H. White found the group Pictorial Photographers of America, which was seen by Stieglitz as a direct challenge to his artistic leadership. By this time, however, Stieglitz's tactics had offended many of his former friends, including White and Robert Demachy, and a year later, he was forced to disband the Photo-Secession.

During this time, many young women starting in photography sought Käsebier, both for her photographic artistry and for inspiration as an independent woman. Among those who were inspired by Käsebier and who went on to have successful careers of their own were Clara Sipprell, Consuelo Kanaga, Laura Gilpin, Florence Maynard, and Imogen Cunningham.

Throughout the late 1910s and most of the 1920s, Käsebier continued to expand her portrait business, taking photographs of many important people of the time, including Robert Henri, John Sloan, William Glackens, Arthur B. Davies, Mabel Dodge, and Stanford White. In 1924, her daughter Hermine Turner joined her in her portrait business.

In 1929, Käsebier gave up photography altogether and liquidated the contents of her studio. The same year, she was given a major solo exhibition at the Brooklyn Institute of Arts and Sciences.

Käsebier died on October 12, 1934, at the home of her daughter Hermine Turner.

A major collection of her work is held by the University of Delaware. In 1979, Käsebier was inducted into the International Photography Hall of Fame and Museum.

== Gallery ==
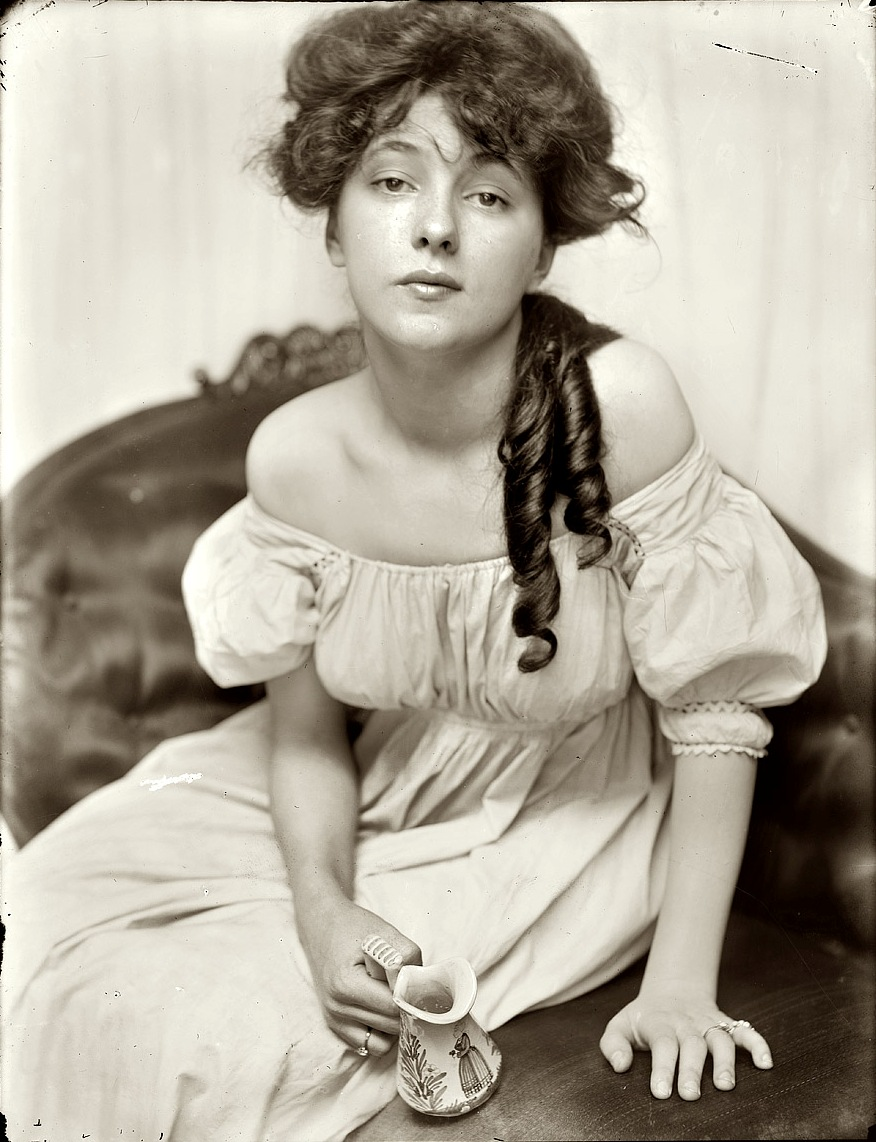
Miss N
(Portrait of Evelyn Nesbit), 1902

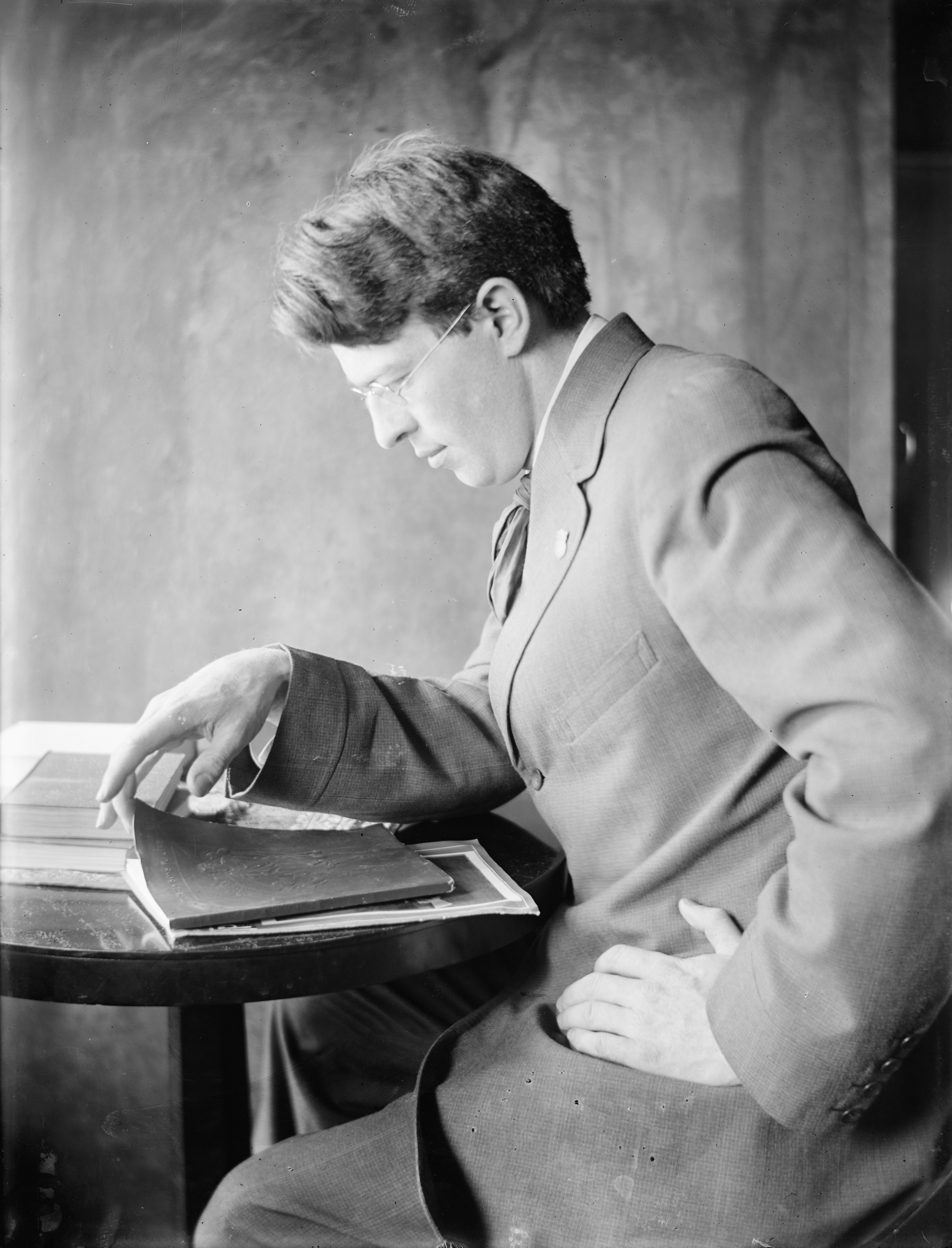
Clarence White Sr., 1897–1910

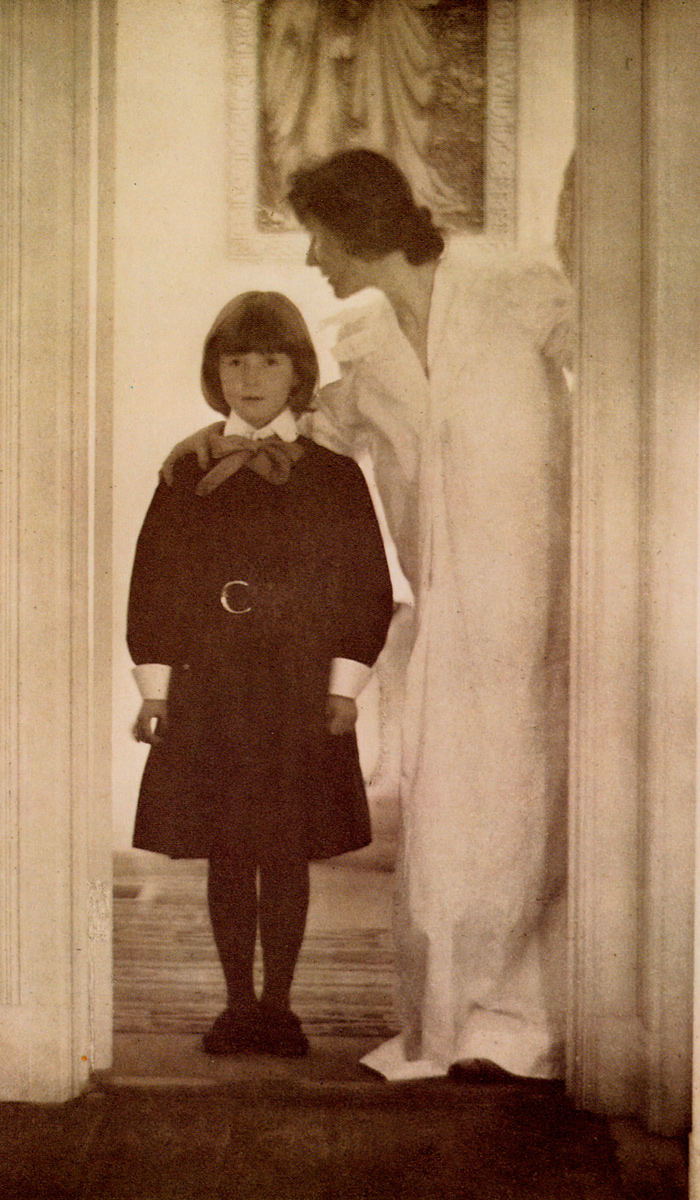
Blessed Art Thou Among Women, c. 1899

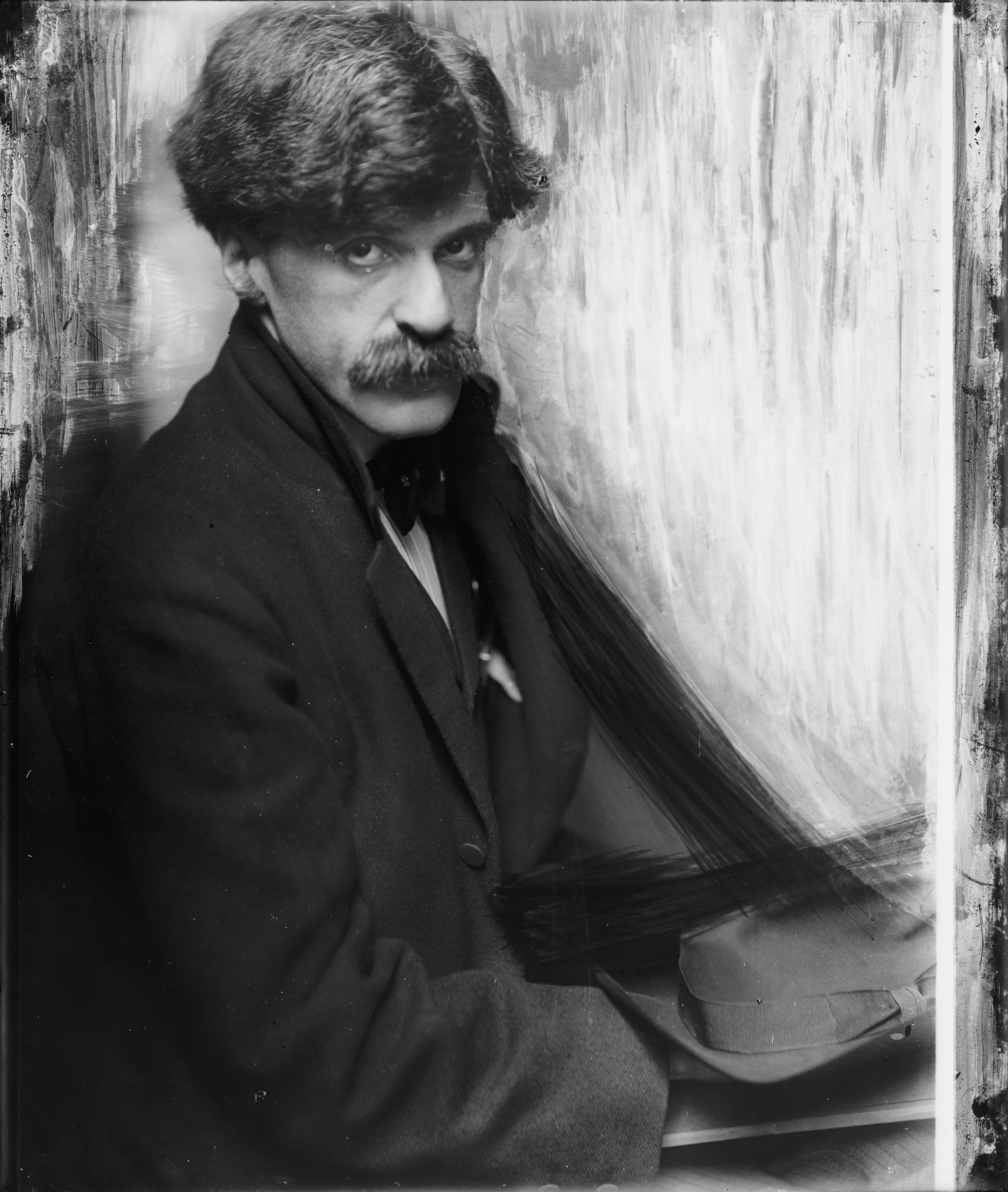
Portrait of Alfred Stieglitz, 1902

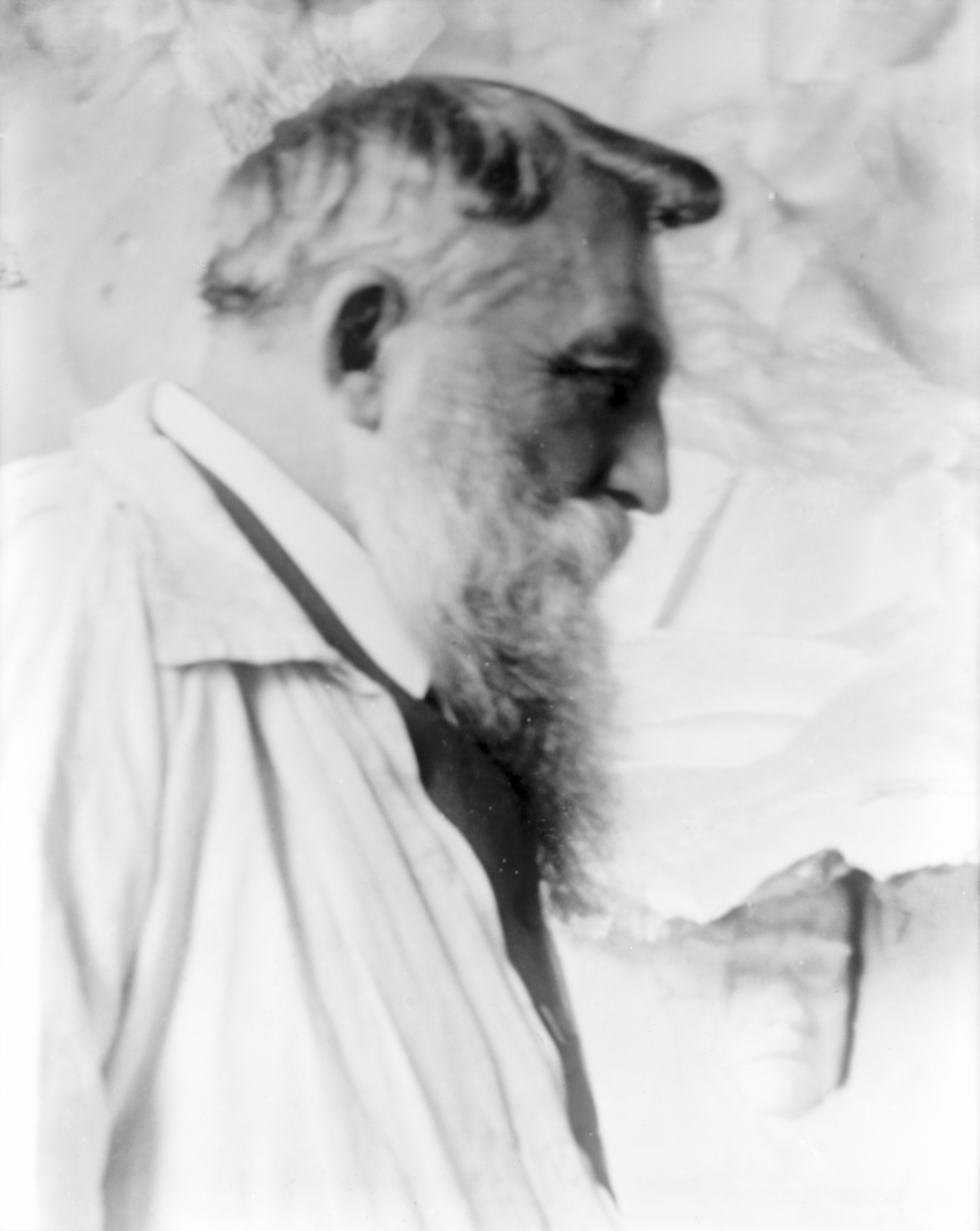
Auguste Rodin, 1905

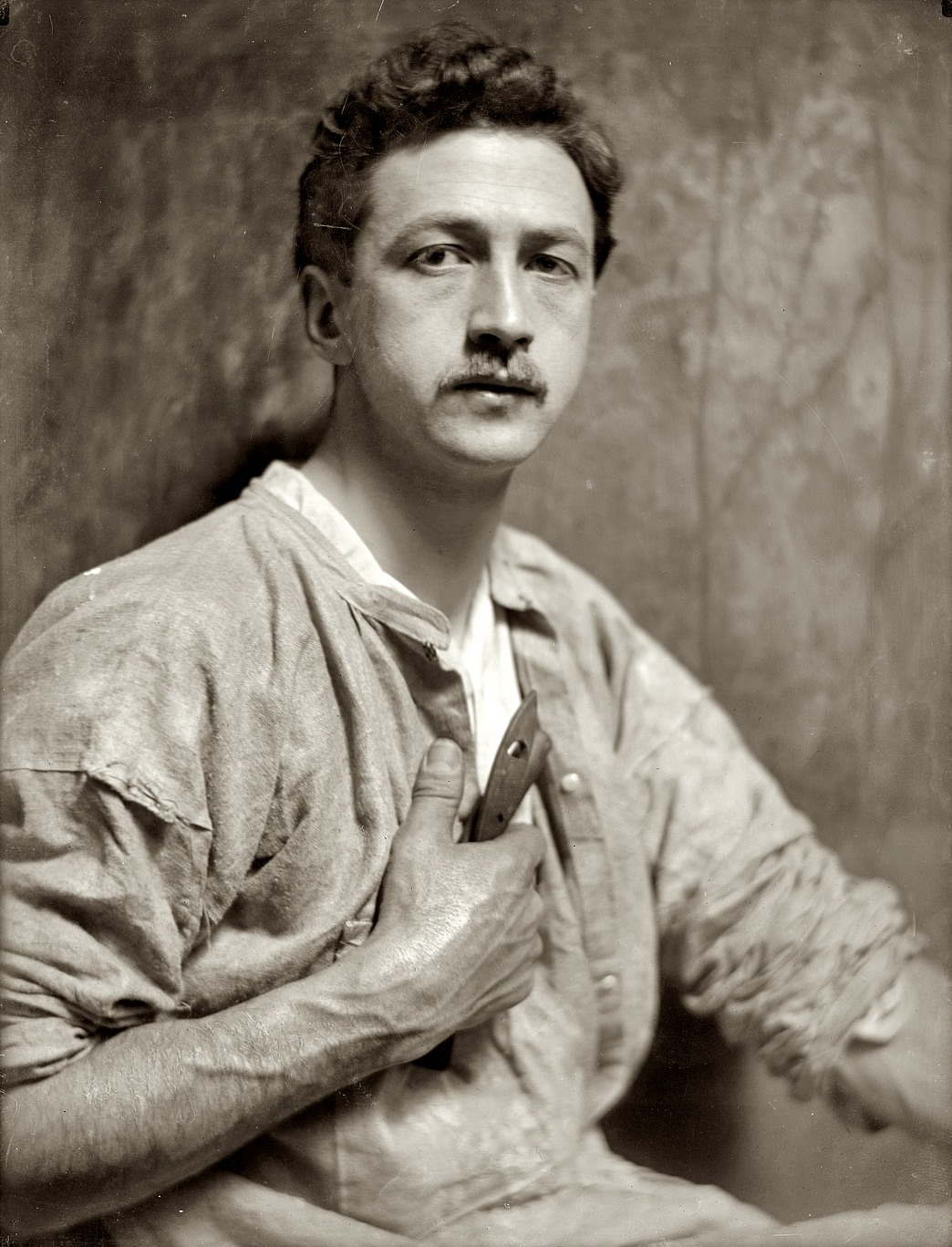
Chester Beach, 1910

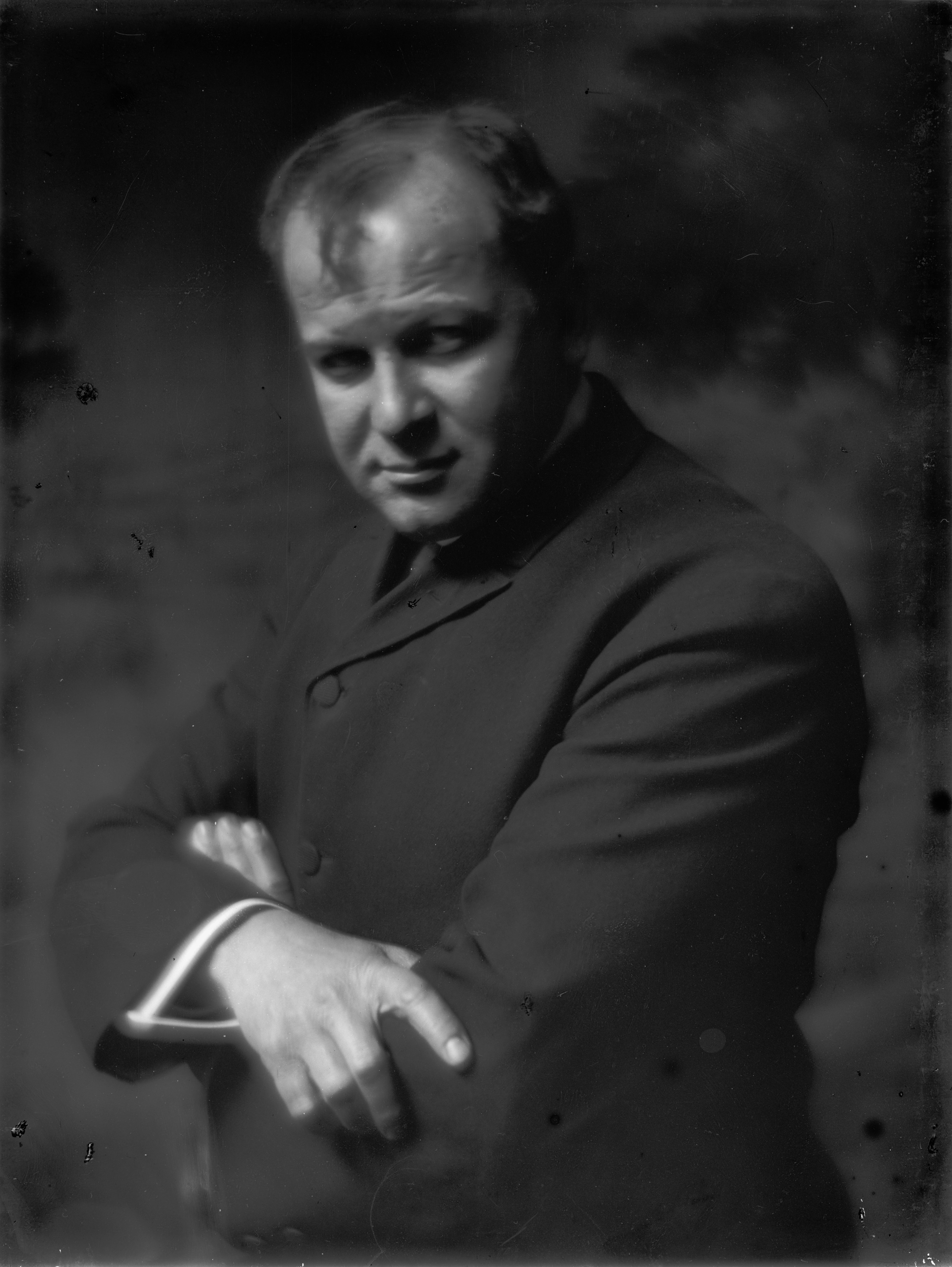
Portrait of George Luks (American painter), c. 1910

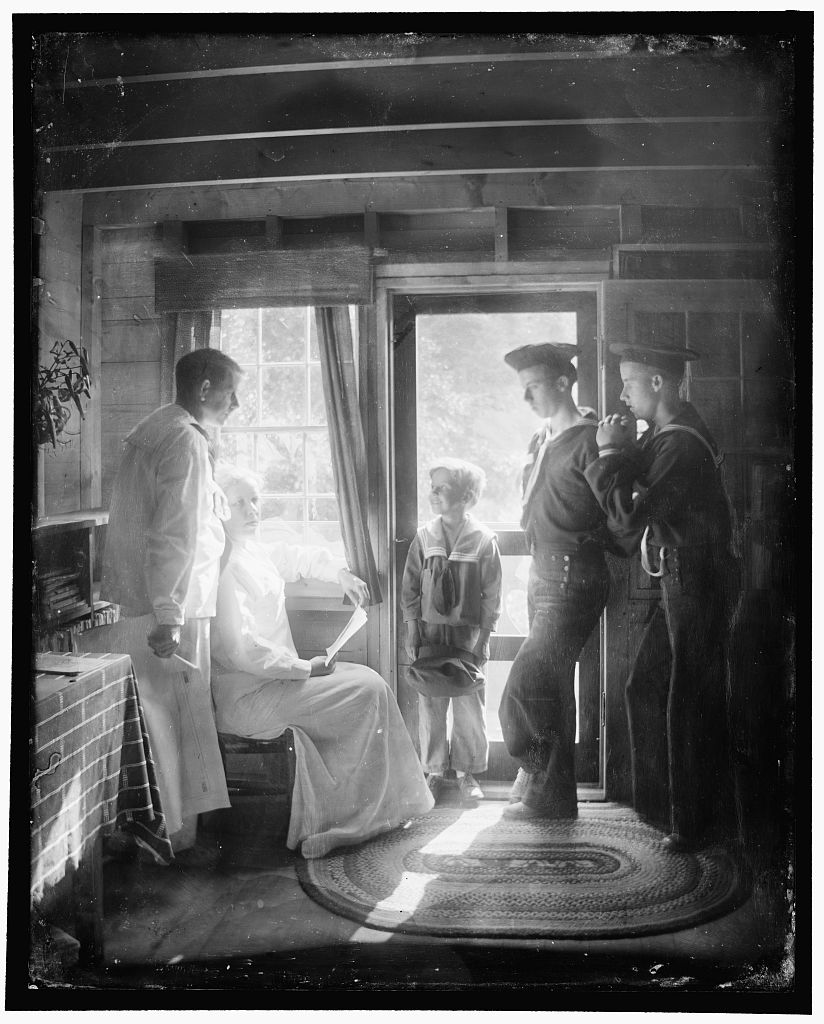
The Clarence White Family in Maine
(American photographer), 1913

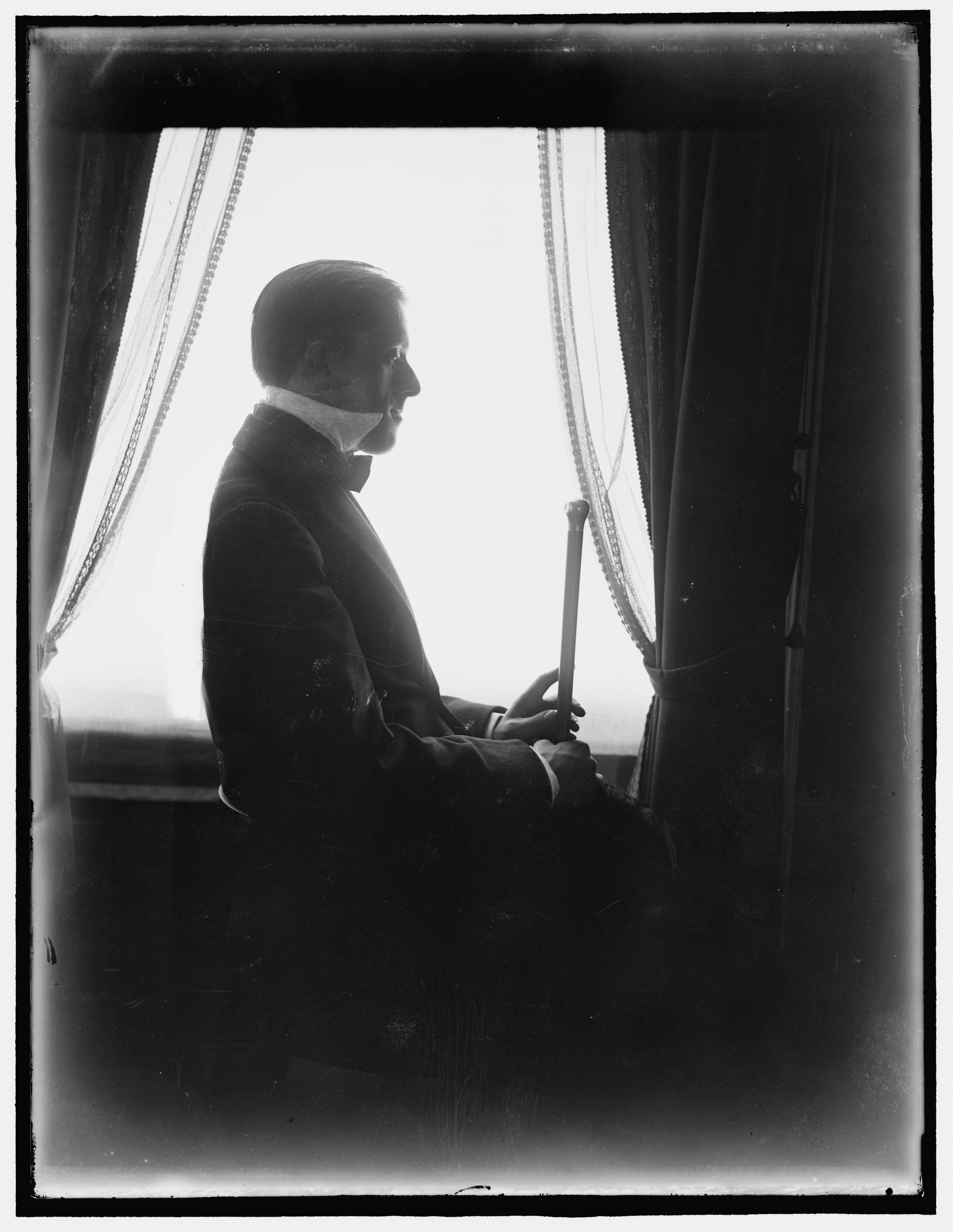
John Murray Anderson, c. 1914–1916

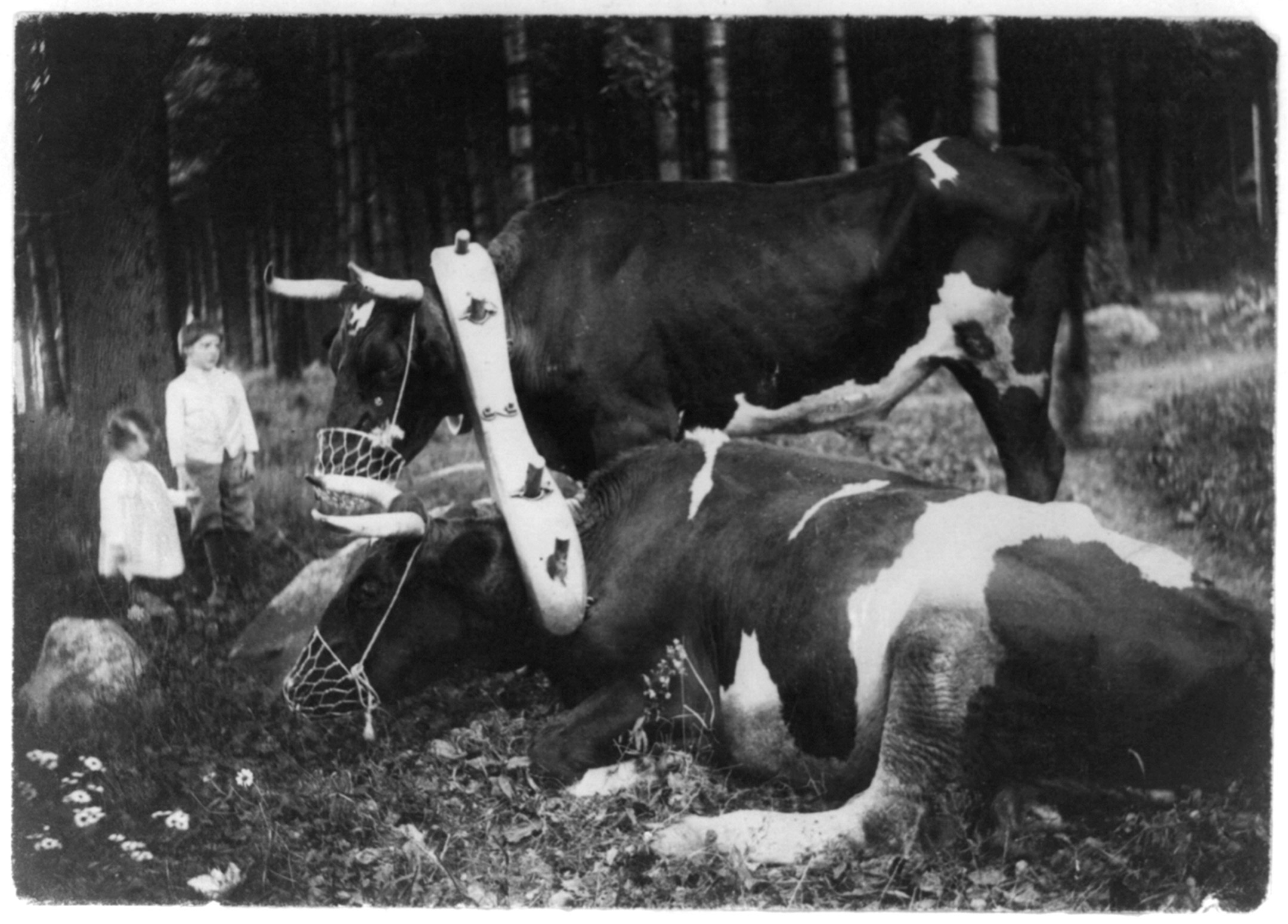
Yoked and Muzzled Marriage, c. 1915

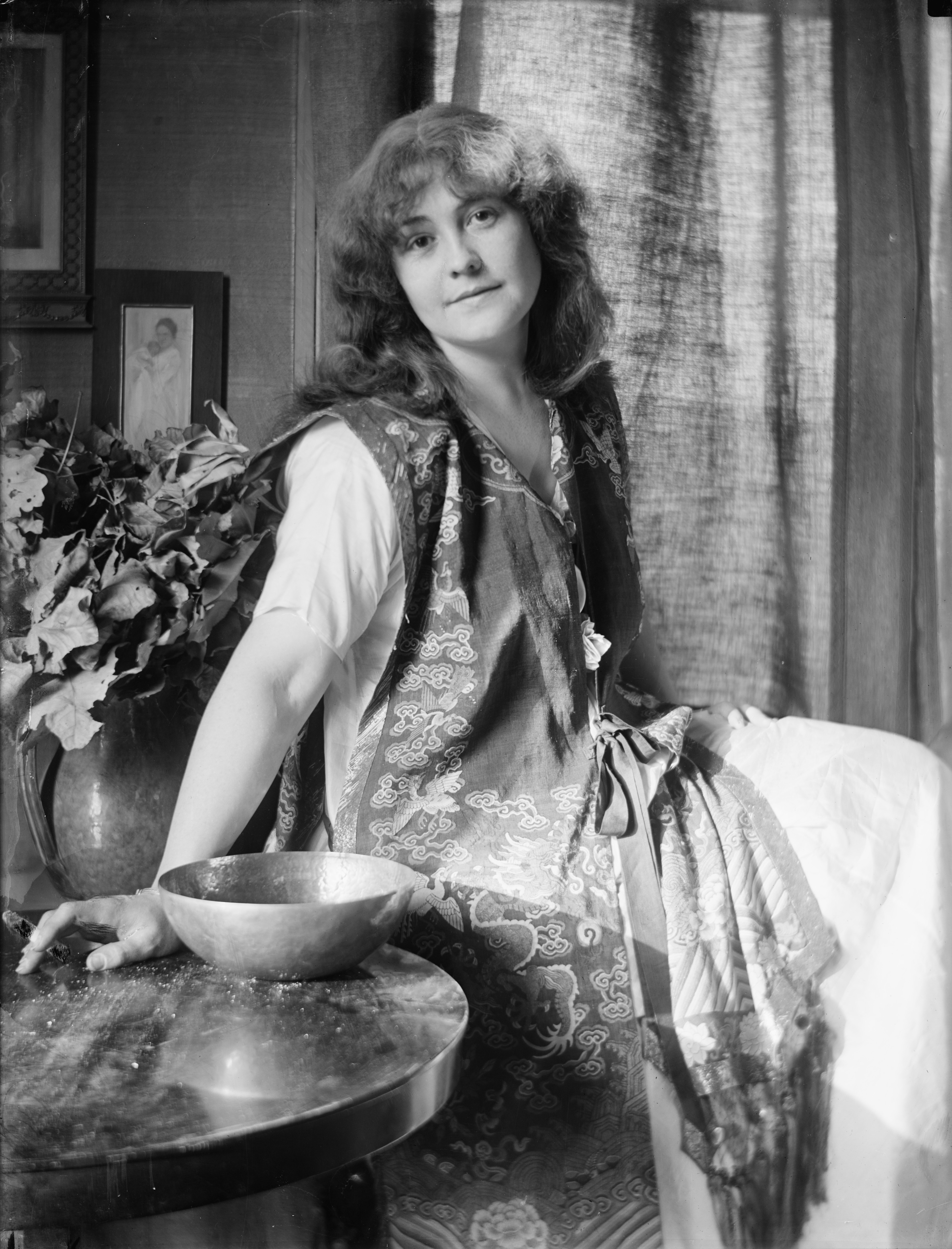
Rose O'Neill, c. 1907

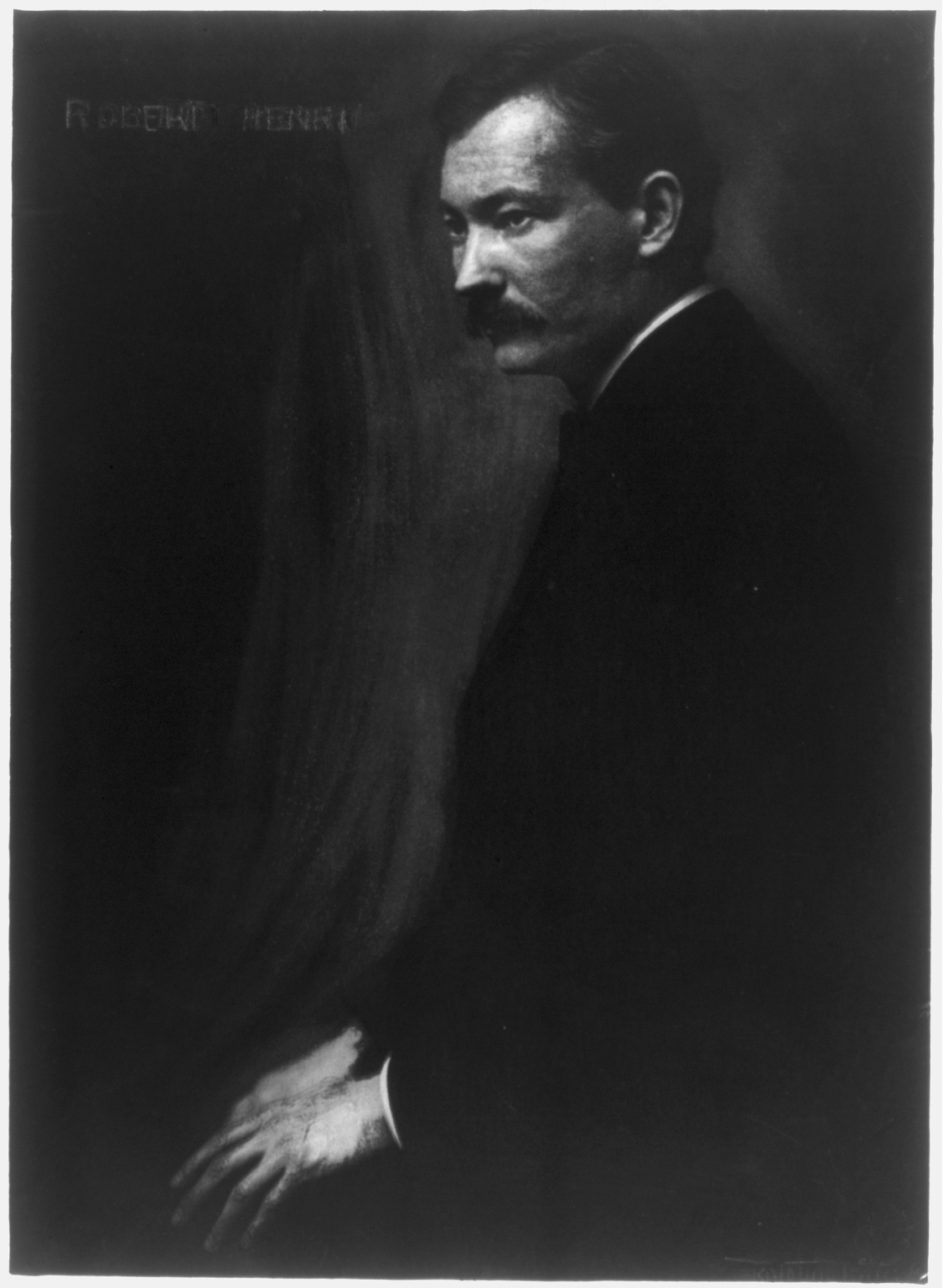
Portrait of Robert Henri (American painter), c. 1907

Dorothy, c. 1900

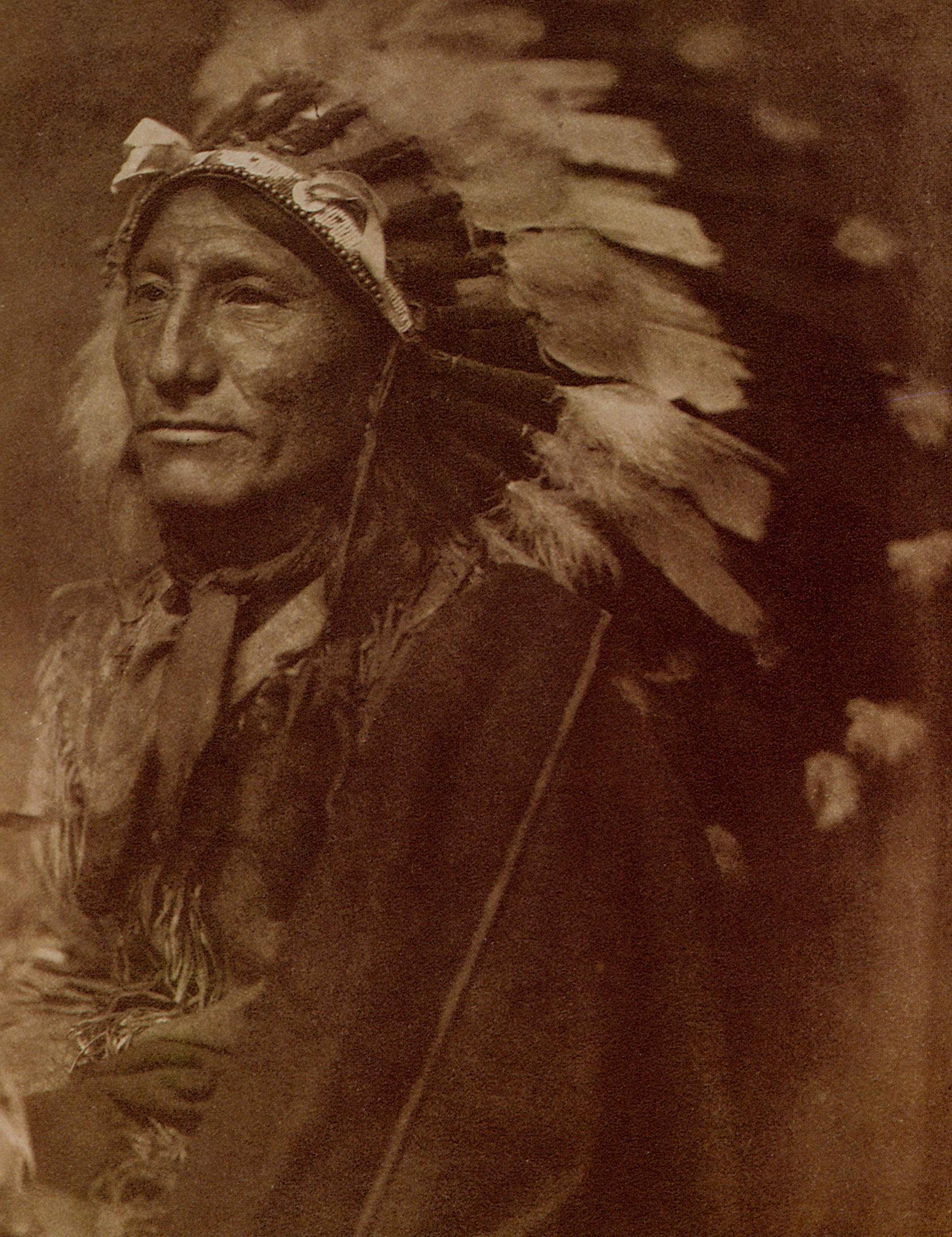
Indian Chief, c. 1901

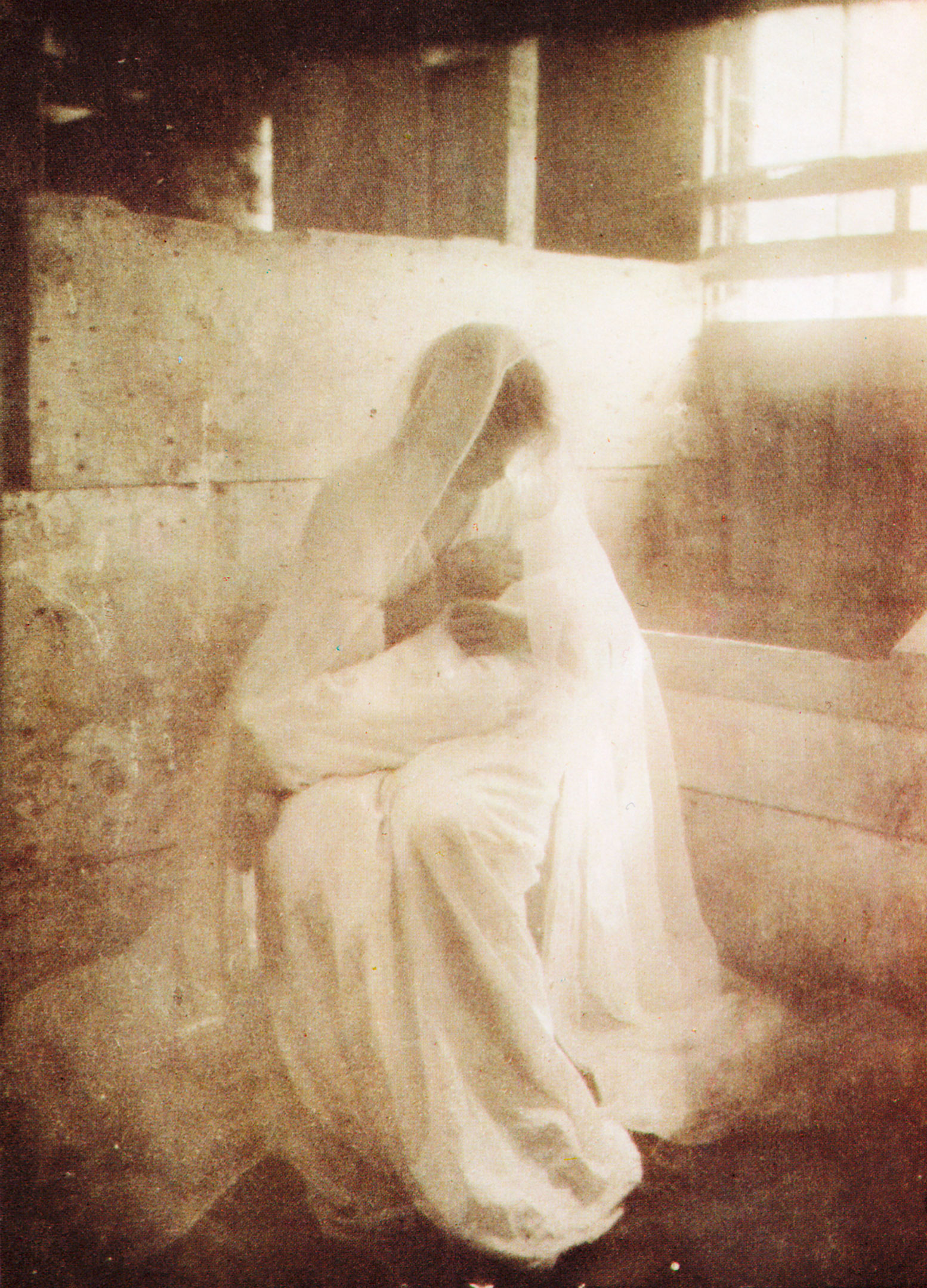
The Manger, c. 1899

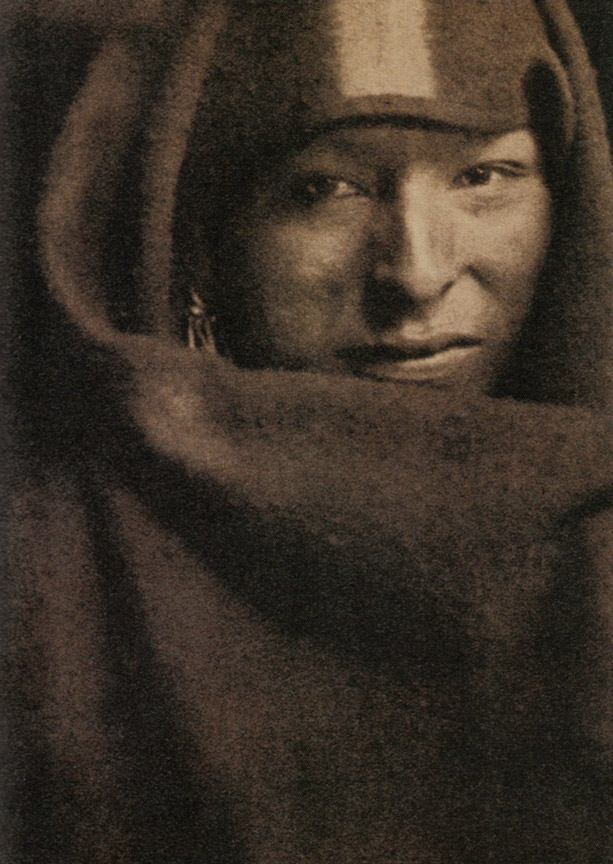
The Red Man, 1903

== Additional reading ==
- Tomlinson, Janis A. (2013). Stephen Petersen (ed.). Gertrude Käsebier, the complexity of light and shade : photographs and papers of Gertrude Käsebier in the University of Delaware Collections. [Newark, Del.]: University of Delaware. ISBN 9780615735450.
- Delaney, Michelle. Buffalo Bill's Wild West Warriors: A Photographic History by Gertrude Käsebier. Smithsonian, 2007. ISBN 0061129771.
