= Christian Andreas Käsebier =

German robber and intelligence operative (1710–after 1757)

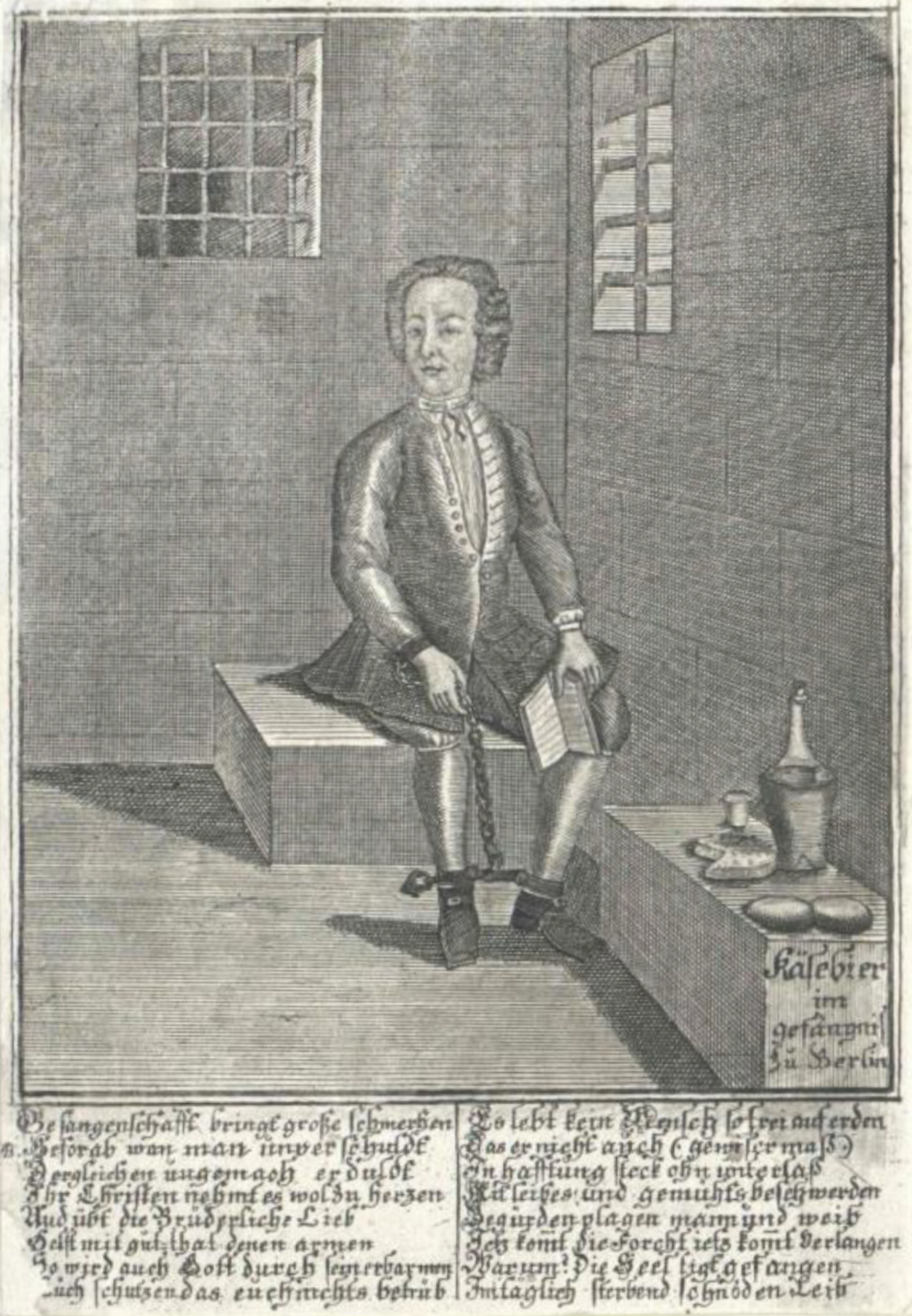
- Käsebier in a Berlin jail
- Born: c. 1710; Halle, Saxony-Anhalt
- Died: Unknown
- Occupations: Prussian Intelligence Operative, tailor
- Parent(s): Johann von Christophe Käsebier, Margaretha Kuhn
- Espionage activity
- Allegiance: Kingdom of Prussia
- Service branch: Siege of Prague
- Service years: 1757

Christian Andreas Käsebier (c. 1710 – after 1757) was a thief and robber from the Holy Roman Empire during the 18th century who became an intelligence operative for King Frederick the Great following a sentence of life imprisonment.

== Early life ==
Käsebier was born around 1710 in Halle, Saxony-Anhalt, the son of Johann von Christophe Käsebier and Margaretha Kuhn. Christian and his siblings were raised in the French Reformed religion. He came from a long line of successful tailors, in which his father educated him to continue in the family profession. His brother, Johann George, would become the personal tailor for Count Casimir, before emigrating to Pennsylvania, however, Christian rebelled and entered a life of crime.

== Crime boss ==
It is said that Christian Andreas became an infamous crime boss, staging numerous robberies and heists. He was caught on many occasions, but never executed, eventually being released every time. He was not a violent criminal, rather he used his charm and intelligence to accomplish most of his work. He was considered cunning and extremely deceptive.

=== Life imprisonment ===
Käsebier was staying in Brandenburg an der Havel under an assumed named when he was finally arrested in 1748 and sentenced to life in prison at Stettin by the King.

== Recruitment as intelligence operative ==
In 1757, King Frederick the Great was engaged in the Seven Years' War and was conducting the Siege of Prague. He was in need of intelligence operatives who could penetrate behind enemy lines. The King personally recruited Käsebier with the promise of a pardon in return for his intelligence services. Käsebier successfully smuggled himself into the besieged city three times, but on the fourth mission became hesitant over the fear of being known now. The King threatened to send him back to prison, so Käsebier agreed to the fourth mission. He vanished soon thereafter, never to be heard from again, although it is claimed he was executed by the Austrians.

== Popular culture ==
- It is claimed that Friedrich Schiller's play The Robbers, from 1781, is loosely based on Christian Andreas and his father, Johann.
- In 1972, the events surrounding the siege at Prague were adapted for the film The Stolen Battle with Manfred Krug cast in the lead role as Christian Andreas.
- Käsebier is compared numerous times to the romanticized criminals of Europe, including having been cited in 2001 along with Diego Corrientes Mateos, Robin Hood, Dick Turpin, and Louis Mandrin as one of Europe's most fabled criminals.
- In Benjamin Carter Hett's 2008 book Crossing Hitler, Christian Andreas Käsebier was cited as having stayed in the notorious Spandau Prison at one point and considered legendary.
- In Kevin Casebier's 2021 book, King of Thieves, Christian Andreas Käsebier is described as the "Prussian Robin Hood", a master of disguise and cunning leader of a band of highwaymen.
