= Samuel Lifschey =

American viola player

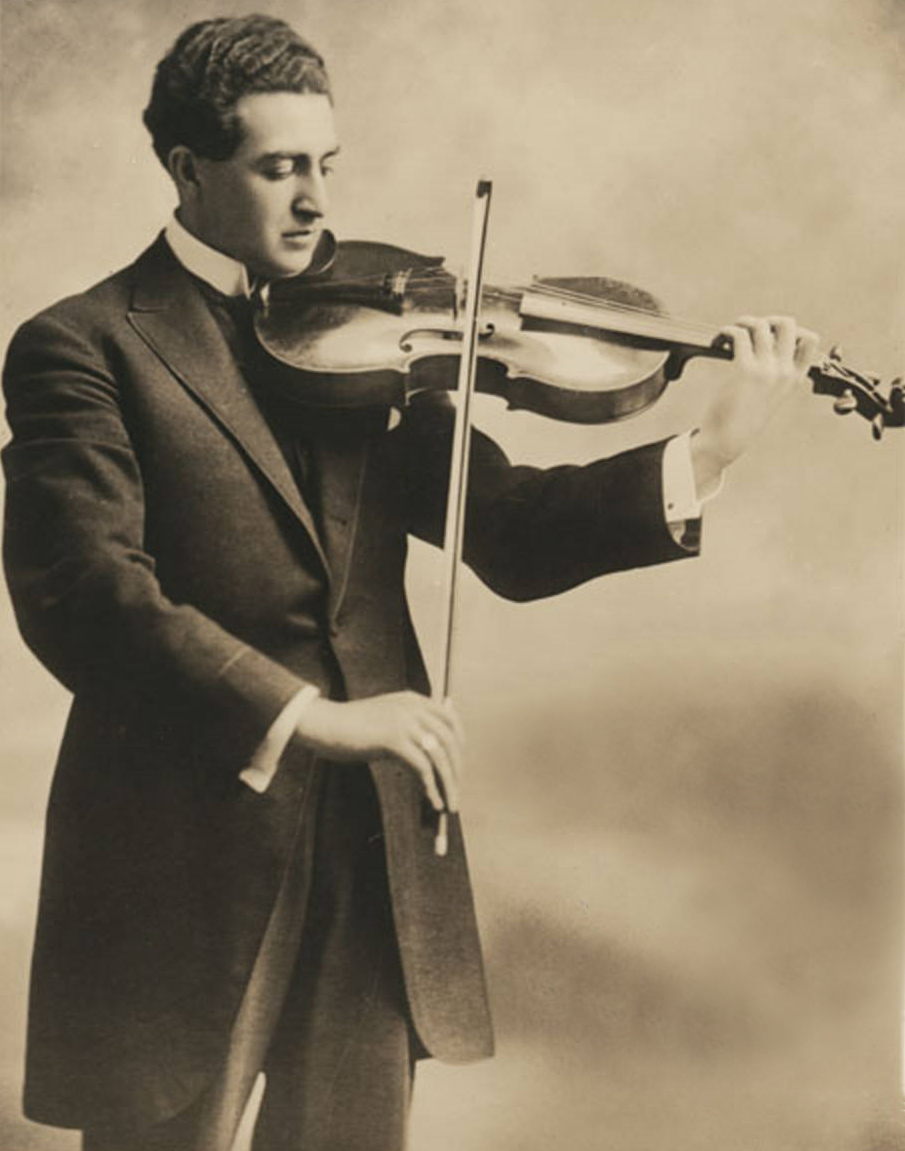
Samuel Lifschey

Samuel Lifschey (May 6, 1889 – September 14, 1961) was an American viola player.

== Biography ==
Lifschey was born on May 6, 1889, in Manhattan, New York City and began his musical studies at the age of nine, studying violin with Arnold Volpe, viola with Henri Casadesus, and theory with Rubin Goldmark. In 1911, he graduated with a degree in civil engineering from Cooper Union and began his lengthy career as a musician. He was appointed to the position of solo viola with the New York Symphony Orchestra under Walter Damrosch in 1916 and served as a bandmaster with the United States Navy during World War I. Brief stints as principal violist of The Cleveland Orchestra and The Detroit Symphony followed before he was lured to the principal violist position with the Philadelphia Orchestra in 1925 at the request of Leopold Stokowski. He remained in that position until his retirement in 1955.

He died on September 14, 1961, in Philadelphia, Pennsylvania.

== Legacy ==
In addition to Lifschey's career as an orchestral violist, he was also a prominent viola soloist, the “first native-born American to achieve virtuoso rank” on the viola. His March 24, 1919, Aeolian Hall recital with soprano Greta Torpadie is often considered the first solo viola recital in New York City, and he gave the American premieres of numerous works for viola and orchestra, including Paul Hindemith’s Konzertmusik, op. 48, Isadore Freed’s Rhapsody, Georges Hüe’s Théme Varié, and the Handel-Casadesus Concerto in B Minor. Lifschey was also an important champion of viola music by American composers, and he gave premieres and other important performances of viola works by Ernest Bloch, George Frederick Boyle, Samuel Gardner, Rubin Goldmark, Walter Golde, Henry Holden Huss, and Gustav Strube.

Lifschey also contributed greatly with his early publications of viola music, including original pedagogical materials and transcriptions and editions of other works. Published widely by Schirmer, Associated Music Publishers, and Carl Fischer, these works were readily available to American students who were increasingly turning to the viola in the early twentieth century. Lifschey made only a handful of recordings, most notably the gavottes from J. S. Bach’s Cello Suite No. 6, in 1941, the earliest known commercial recording of any of the suites played on viola.

Lifschey is depicted in the Santa Monica Library Murals by American artist Stanton Macdonald-Wright as part of a panel of “famous executants on musical instruments.”

== Publications ==
- Original Works
  - Daily Technical Studies for the Viola, 1929
  - Double-Stop Studies for the Viola, 1943
  - Scale and Arpeggio Studies for the Viola, 1939
  - Twelve Modulatory Studies for the Viola, 1936
- Editions/Arrangements
  - J. S. Bach: Six Suites for Unaccompanied Viola, 1936
  - Johannes Brahms: Orchestral Excerpts for the Viola, 1954
  - Bartolomeo Campagnoli: 41 Caprices for the Viola, 1944
  - J. P. Rameau: Menuet from the opera Platée, 1929
  - Henry Schradiek: The School of Violin-Technics, Transcribed for Viola, 1951
  - Friedrich Seitz: Student Concerto No. 2, Transcribed for Viola, 1955
  - Friedrich Seitz: Student Concerto No. 3, Transcribed for Viola, 1955
  - Otakar Ševčík: Selected Studies in First Position, 1951

== Recordings ==
- J. S. Bach, Cello Suite No. 6 (Gavottes only), 1941
- Johannes Brahms, Sonata No. 1 in F Minor, op. 120, no. 1, (with Egon Petri, piano), 1941
- Leoš Janáček, Concertino for piano, 2 violins, viola, clarinet, horn, and bassoon, 1954
- Richard Strauss, Don Quixote (with Emanuel Feuermann, cello, and the Philadelphia Orchestra, Eugene Ormandy, conductor), 1940
