= Dirk Käsebier =

German boxer (born 1966)

Dirk Käsebier (born 16 September 1966) is a German boxer. He competed for the SC Dynamo Berlin.
