= Gordon Stretton =

British and Argentinian musician

- Born: William Masters; 5 June 1887; Liverpool, England
- Died: 3 May 1983 (aged 95); Buenos Aires, Argentina
- Occupations: Music hall, jazz, singing and radio programmes
- Years active: 1896 - 1950s
- Known for: Brought jazz to Latin America
- Spouse: Mary Agnes (Molly) Smith

Gordon Stretton (5 June 1887 – 3 May 1983), born William Masters, was an English singer, dancer and musical director of mixed Irish and Jamaican descent. He became one of the first Liverpool-based musicians to gain international acclaim, and is credited with introducing jazz to Latin America.

== Personal life ==
His mother Sarah Ann Jane Masters (née Williams, 1862–1903) was from Ireland and moved with her parents to Liverpool as a child. His father, William Alexander Gordon Masters, was born in Jamaica around 1854 and worked as a seaman on SS Andean, owned by the Liverpool-based West India Pacific Steamship Company. His parents married in Liverpool on 23 June 1884. They had three sons, all of whom enlisted in the First World War. One was killed and the other two were injured, one by poison gas. His father died at sea in 1896 or 1897 and his mother in 1903.

Stretton was born in 1887 in the slum area of Byrom Street courts and then lived in several places in central Liverpool as a child. He is one of the shoeless boys sitting around the Steble Fountain in William Brown Street in Liverpool photographed in 1896 by Charles F. Inston.

In 1914 Stretton joined the army and was officially a soldier for two years, although part was time recovering from injury. He met his future wife, Mary Agnes (Molly) Smith, a nurse at Mill Hill Military Hospital, London, when he was sent there for convalescence. She was from Bray in Ireland. They moved to Paris and married in Nice in March 1921. Stretton's career took them to South America in 1923. He never revisited Europe, although his wife made a brief visit to family members in the UK in 1953. She died 27 November 1957. They did not have any children.

Stretton died in Argentina on 3 May 1983 at the British Hospital, Buenos Aires after living from the late 1970s at the Casa Del Teatro, a nursing home for former performers. He was buried in the Cementerio Británico, Buenos Aires.

== Career ==
Stretton was interested in music and performance from a young age, although he did not have any formal musical training. In 1892, when he was five, he sneaked into a music hall performance at the Haymarket Theatre in Liverpool, and drew attention to himself by singing from the audience and then being invited onto the stage to sing. When he was around nine (1896), as a result of this performance, his mother allowed him to join The Five Boys (later The Eight Lancashire Lads) clog dancing and singing troupe. He toured music halls in Britain with this group for the next two years.

From 1903 onwards he used the stage name Gordon Stretton derived from his father's middle name and the well-known American-born singer and dancer Eugene Stratton.

He started a sole career with music hall engagements in North Wales and the adjacent areas of Cheshire and Shropshire. He also had some tuition in singing from a minister in Llandudno. As his reputation developed, he appeared in a pantomime in Liverpool in 1904-5 that also included the young American Billie Burke.

He joined the Jamaican Choral Union as a singer and musical director in the UK and was with them in Jamaica in January 1907 when there was a particularly severe earthquake. Following the earthquake, they returned to the UK and held benefit concerts in 1907 and 1908, with the choir's expenses paid by the Liverpool businessman Alfred Lewis Jones.

=== London ===
In 1908 he continued his solo career, moving to London and signing with an agent. Taking advantage of current popular trends he styled himself the "Natural Artistic Coon". He also had an opportunity to travel more widely in 1909 with bookings in South Africa (although he was not permitted to disembark) and Sydney in Australia. In Sydney he performed at the Tivoli Theatre and met boxer Jack Johnson who was performing exhibition matches in the theatre. On returning to the UK Stretton continued to develop his career through meeting and working with African American performers such as Seth Weeks and the Versatile Three (Anthony Tuck, Charles Wenzel Mills, Charles Wesley Johnson). His musical skills developed as he gained experience of the syncopated music in ragtime and jazz that became popular in Europe from 1910 onwards.

Between 1913 and 1919 he was occasionally the percussionist with the Versatile Three (later Versatile Four when joined by Gus Haston) replacing Charlie Johnson. Their musical style prefigured jazz and the rapid tempo required faster and close movement by dancers. This American group from Chicago was very popular in music halls as well as at the more exclusive Murray's Club. Edward, Prince of Wales (future King Edward VIII) visited Murray's and Stretton met him. Stretton also performed in touring shows including Dark Town Jingles (later renamed Dusky Revels) directed by the American arranger and pianist William Henry "Billy" Dorsey who had made musical arrangements for the Versatile Four. This revue started touring the UK in 1916.

=== Paris ===
Stretton played initially with Louis Mitchell's Jazz Kings but in 1923 he formed his own group Orchestre Syncopated Six which made several recordings for Pathé. These included "Fate" and "Tu Verras." Among the band's singers were Sadie Crawford.

=== South America, Argentina ===
From Paris, he visited Brazil with his jazz band and performed the opening song at a Copacabana club.

He settled in Buenos Aires, Argentina from the late 1920s after being hired by businessman Augusto Álvarez to act in one of the local entertainment companies, at the cinema theatre "Select Lavalle". Stretton performed with his own group at the Cafe L'Aiglon and was included in the Argentine Theatre Yearbook in 1926. In 1927 he performed for Buenos Aires' Grand Carnival balls. In 1928 he embarked on a three-month tour around Argentina, employing the Brazilian composer and musician Luiz Americano as part of his group. By 1929 he had founded Gordon Stretton's Symphonic Jazz Band. He accompanied Edward, Prince of Wales, during his tour of Argentina.

Radio broadcasting developed in Argentina from August 1920 onwards, and Stretton became an early contributor. He began appearing on radio in 1929 and by the mid-1930s he hosted his own radio show Hullo Jazz on the Buenos Aires radio station LR8 Paris. He also led a live performance by his current 14-piece band. In 1931 Stretton again performed in Brazil at the El Dorado theater, appearing with singers including Carmen Miranda and the American Little Esther.

During the Second World War, Stretton wrote and performed songs to raise money for the British airforce and International Red Cross.

In 1936 Stretton was one of the founding members of the Argentinian performing rights society, SADAIC. Also in the same year banjoist Tony Tuck who had been in the Versatile Three and Versatile Four moved from the US to Argentina and joined Stretton's band. Later, in 1948, Vic Filmer from the UK also became part of Stretton's group.

In July 1953 Stretton was co-author of a requiem in a radio broadcast across Argentina on the first anniversary of Eva Perón's death.

In the 1960s Stretton owned and ran a dance academy.

He finally retired in the 1970s, although his last performance was when he was 92 in 1980 at the Cafe Tortoni in Buenos Aires with the jazz singer Lona Warren. The show, Melodies of Hollywood was a tribute to his decades performing and broadcasting jazz.

=== Musical genres ===
Stretton performed in several musical styles during his career, adopting new ones as the twentieth century progressed. As he gained independence and a personal reputation in Wales and northern England, he performed in the popular styles of the American blackface minstrel show and also Edwardian romantic ballad songs. His earliest writing credits are for romantic ballads. After he moved to London and met American musicians, he moved into jazz both performing, writing and directing. This genre was the basis of his reputation for the rest of his career.

== Published songs and recordings ==
One source suggests he authored 200 popular songs while in Argentina, and he is known to have written others earlier in his career. However, most of Stretton's recordings and music have not survived. The following are known to have existed:

=== Recordings ===
Several recordings from 1919 of the Versatile Four in London probably include Stretton as a member. They are:

- Patches Edison Bell Winner EBW 3447
- Mystery Edison Bell Winner EBW 3447
- Bo-Bo Beedle-Um-Bo Edison Bell Winner EBW 3524
- Castle of Dreams Edison Bell Winner EBW 3437
- El Relicario Edison Bell Winner EBW 3437

He recorded with the Syncopated Six in Paris in 1923. In these he was the percussionist.

- Session number 6934 Way down yonder in New Orleans Pathe-6611
- Session number 6935 C'est Paris Pathe-6609
- Session number 6936 Tu verras Montmartre Pathe-6610
- Session number 6937 Lovin' Sam, the Sheik of Alabam Pathe-6611
- Session number 6938 Fate Pathe-6610
- Session number 6939 La Haut Pathe-6609
- He recorded with the Syncopated Jazz Band ("Satanic Blues"/"Lucky Dog Blues" Actuelle 10156 E)

He made recordings when he was in Argentina. These included at least ten for the Odeon label in 1941 and 1942. The following are known:

- Old Madrid Summer 1929, Stretton as composer and vocalist with the Orquesta Adolfo Carabelli led by Adolfo Carabelli. In Spanish. Victor catalog
- Lords of the Air and There'll always be an England Odeon 45766
- God Bless America and You're darn tootin' Odeon 45770 (recorded 8 July 1941)
- Peruana (recorded 4 September 1941) and Pronto Sera Odeon 45802 (recorded 18 March 1942) with profits to International Red Cross
- Siempre Voy Silbando Odeon number unknown (recorded 8 July 1941)
- Gracias, Senor Roosevelt Odeon number unknown (recorded 4 September 1941)
- Punto Punto Punto Raya Odeon number unknown (recorded 16 September 1941)
- Yasha, El Pasha Odeon number unknown (recorded 16 September 1941)

=== Songs ===
Sheet still music exists for several songs sung by Gordon Stretton, including five from pre-1919 where he is credited as one of the authors including:

- If I hadn't got a girl like you by Tom Mellor, Alf J Lawrance and Harry Gifford, published by B Feldman and Co, 1907.
- My Indiana Queen by Tom Mellor and Harry Gifford, published by Francis, Day and Hunter, 1909
- She's somebody's sweet heart by Tom Mellor and Harry Gifford, published by Francis, Day and Hunter, 1909
- There's a brown gal way down in Old Dahomey by Tom Mellor and Harry Gifford, published by Francis, Day and Hunter, 1910
- Good Old Japan in London by Henry E Pether and T F Robson, published by Francis, Day and Hunter, 1910
- If you feel lonely, send around for me by Gordon Stretton and T W Thurban, published by Francis, Day and Hunter, 1911
- In the park after dark by Gordon Stretton, Sidney Davis and T W Thurban, published by Francis, Day and Hunter, 1911
- My sweet Estrella by Gordon Stretton and T W Thurban, published by Francis, Day and Hunter, 1912
- Sweet Irish shamrock by Gordon Stretton, T W Thurban and Sidney Davis, published by Empire Music Publishing Office, 1912
- When the dancers are leaving the ballroom by Gordon Stretton, Sidney Davis and T W Thurban, published by Empire Music Publishing Office, 1912
- Baby Lou by Percy Edgar, published by Francis, Day and Hunter, around 1915
