= Spring Showers, the Coach =

Photograph by Alfred Stieglitz

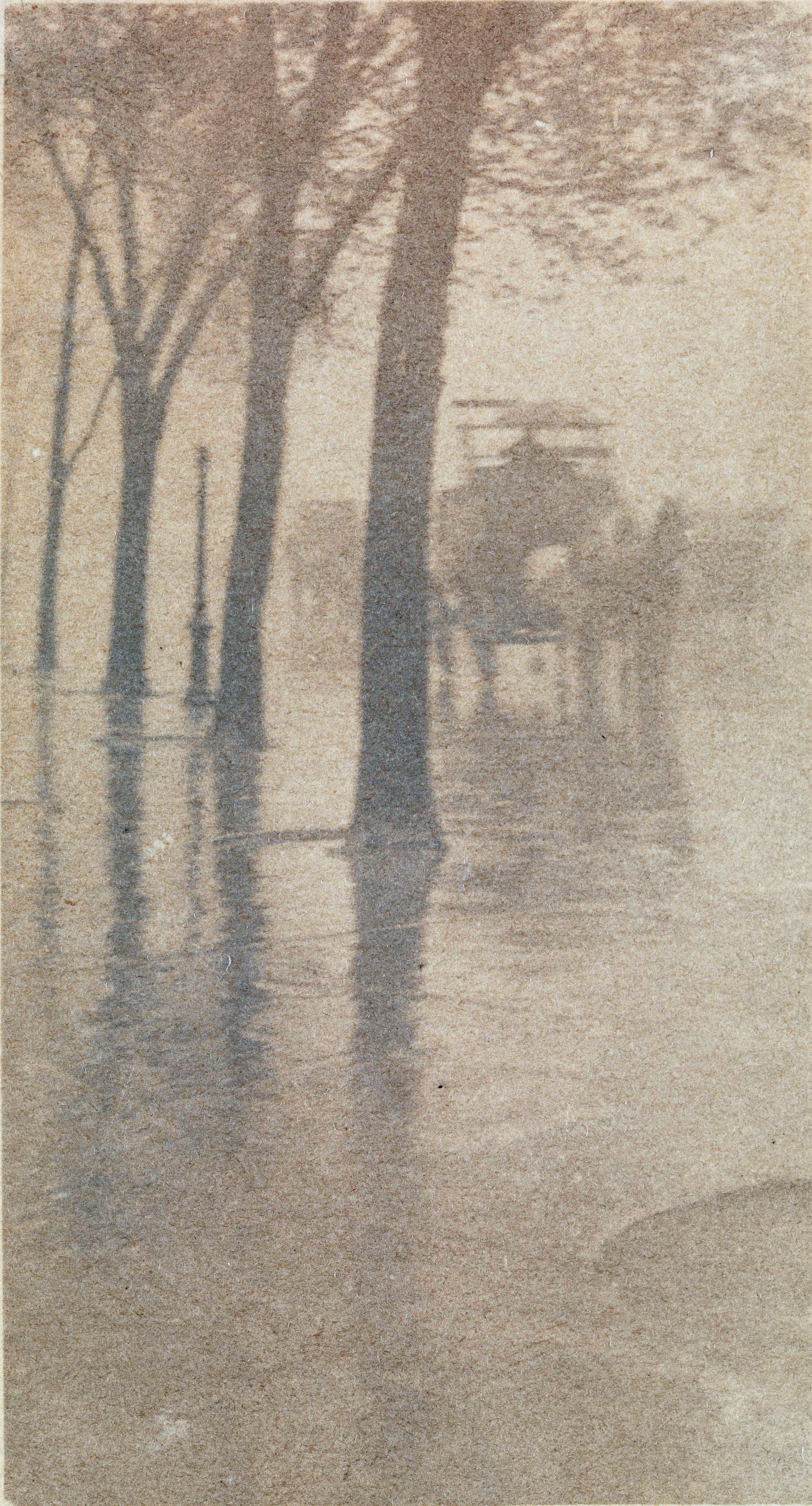
Spring Showers, The Coach (1899–1900) by Alfred Stieglitz

Spring Showers, the Coach is a black and white photograph taken by Alfred Stieglitz in 1899–1900. The picture was published in the Camera Notes journal in January 1902. Sometimes it is incorrectly presented as being taken in 1902.

== History and description ==
Stieglitz started taking a series of nocturnal views of New York, in 1897. The following year he took a new photographic series at Madison Square in the rain. The picture depicts a typical urban scene of the time, with a carriage riding through heavy rain, in a street ornamented with trees to their left. It is one of the best examples of Stieglitz's pictorialist phase, where he tried to emulate the delicate tonal style of the American painter James McNeill Whistler by taking it under rain and snow. There is also some influence of the Japanese art then at vogue in the western world.

Carolyn Burke states that this photograph, similarly to others in the same series, "blends urban and pastoral elements in compositions that show an affinity with the Arts and Crafts aesthetics." According to Burke, the current photograph, like the companion piece, Spring Showers - The Street Cleaner, "share the linearity that would distinguish Stieglitz's photograph of the Flatiron building, on the south side of the square."

== Public collections ==
There are prints of this photograph at the Metropolitan Museum of Art, New York, and at The Minneapolis Institute of Arts.
