= Emilie V. Clarkson =

American photographer (1863–1946)

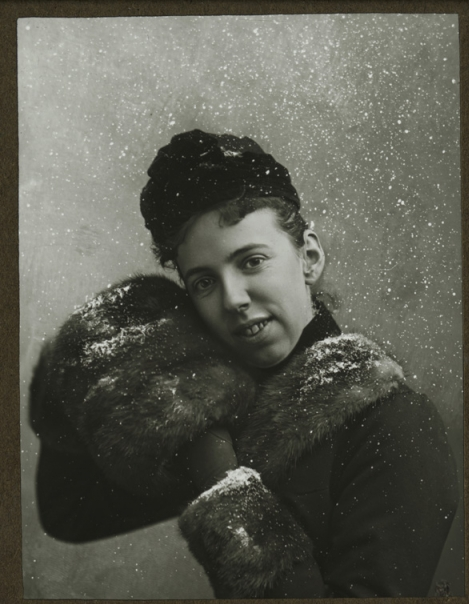
- Born: Emilie Vallete Clarkson; January 31, 1863; Potsdam, New York, US
- Died: December 13, 1946 (aged 83); Potsdam, New York, US
- Education: Chautaqua School of Photography
- Known for: Photography
- Movement: Pictorialism

Emilie Vallete Clarkson (January 31, 1863 – December 13, 1946) was an American photographer.

== Biography ==
Clarkson was born on January 31, 1863, in Potsdam, New York. She attended the Chautauqua School of Photography, graduating in 1890.

Clarkson was a member of the Society of Amateur Photographers of New York and the Camera Club of New York. Her photographs appeared in the publications American Annual of Photography, theAmerican Amateur Photographer and the Photographic Times. Alfred Stieglitz included her work in Camera Notes.

In 1901, Clarkson's work was included in the Glasgow International Exhibition. Soon after that she married William Moore and stopped exhibiting her work.

Clarkson died on December 13, 1946, aged 83, in Potsdam. Her large collection of lantern slides was donated to St. Lawrence University.

Her work in the collection of the Art Institute of Chicago, the Metropolitan Museum of Art, the Minneapolis Institute of Art, the Museum of Modern Art, the Nelson-Atkins Museum of Art, and the New York Public Library Photography Collection.

== Gallery ==
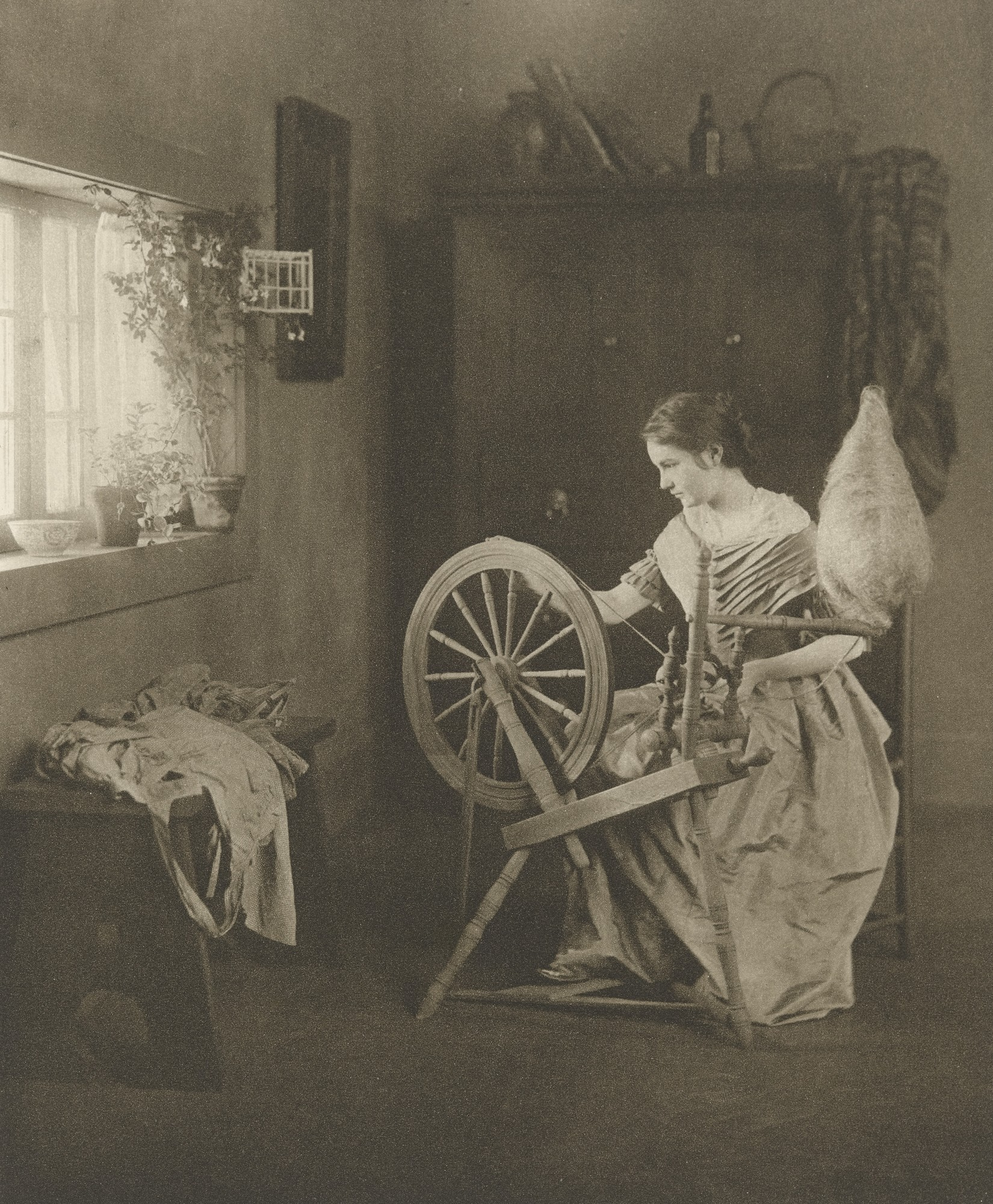
Spinning, 1901

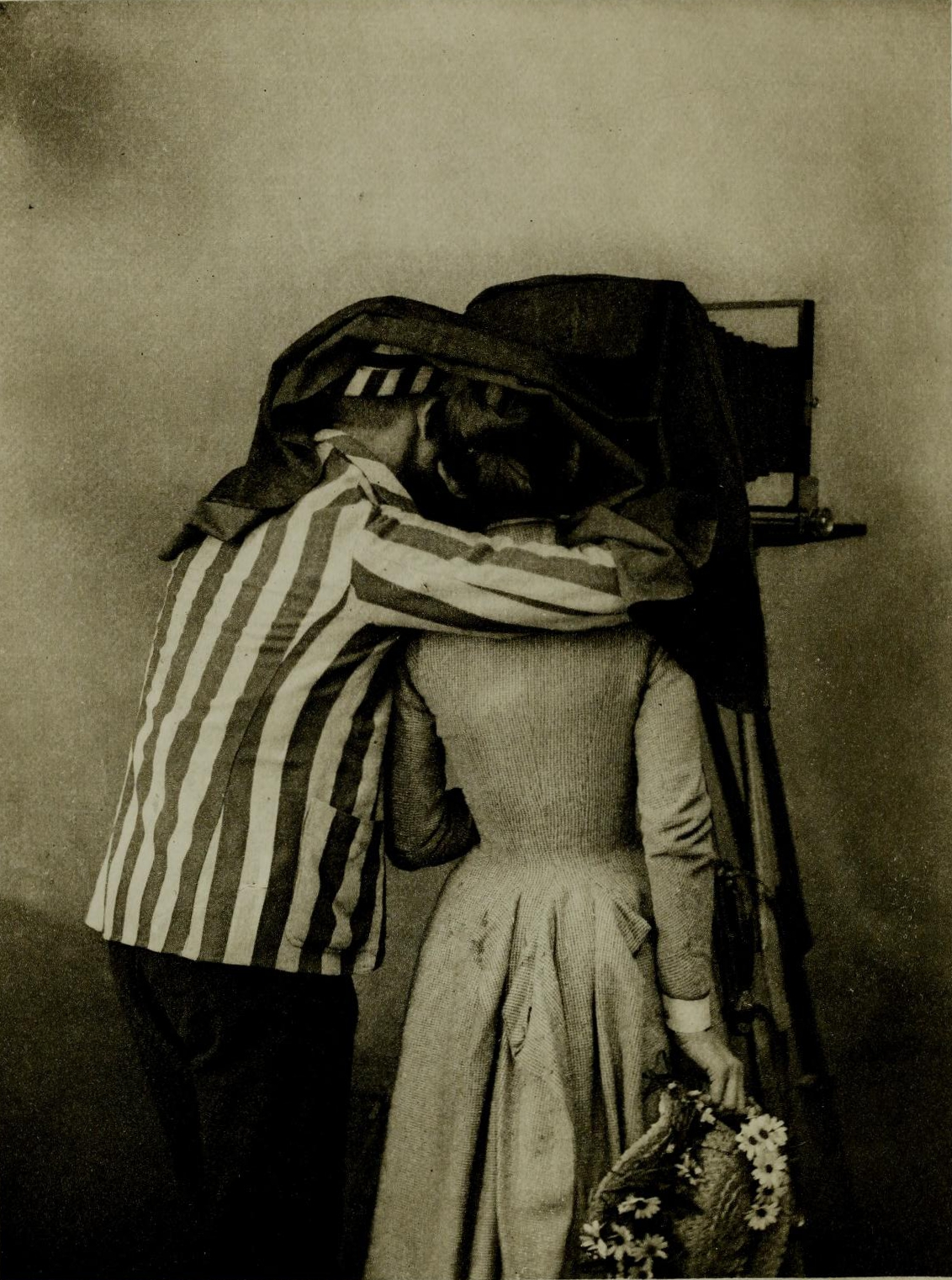
Focusing, 1893

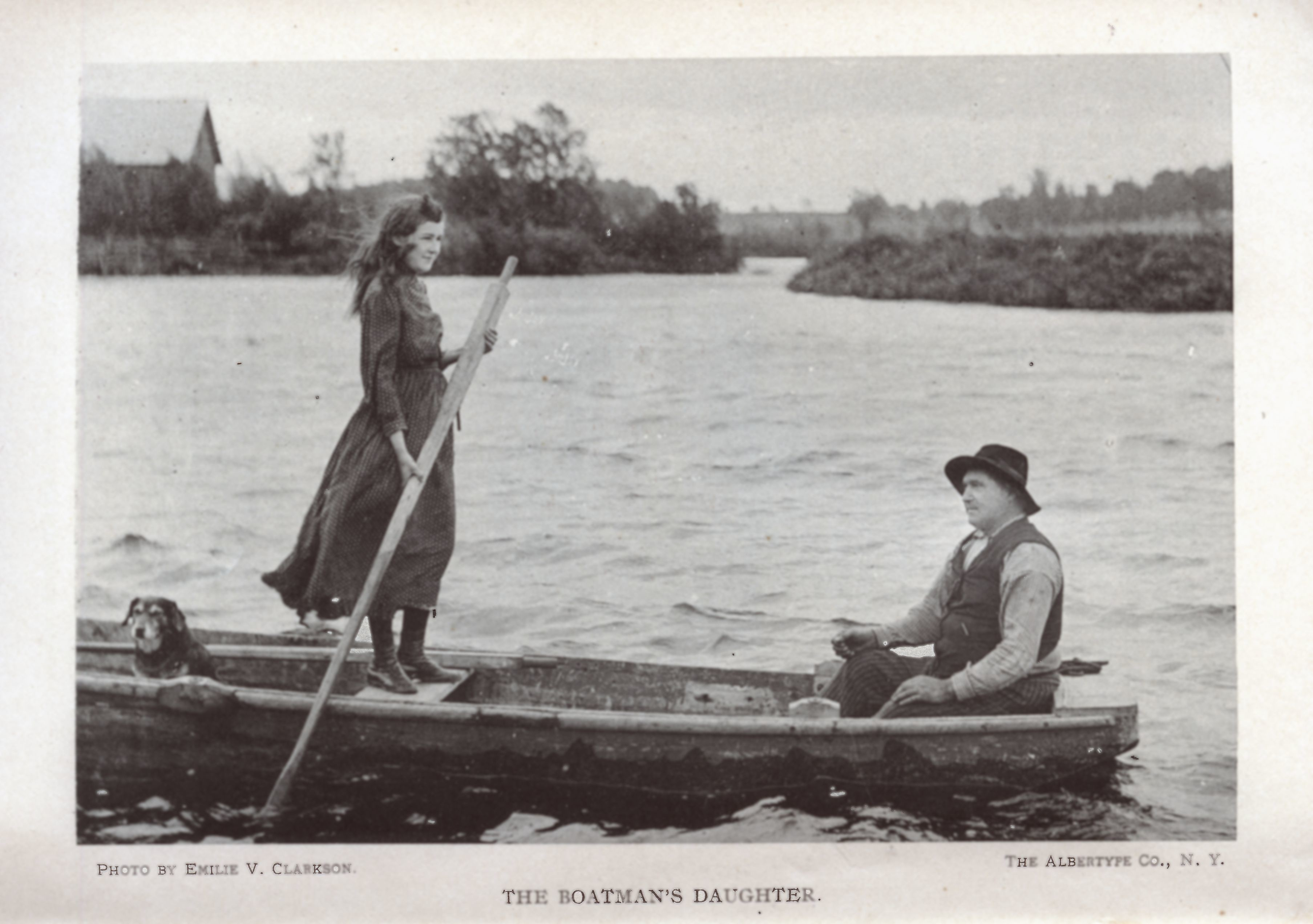
The Boatman's Daughter, 1895
