= Todamerica Records =

Brazilian record label 1950s - 1970s

Todamerica Records was a Brazilian record label, in business from about 1950 through the 1970s. The label specialized in Brazilian music and other music of Latin America. Artists who recorded for Todamerica include João Gilberto and Luiz Americano.

Todamerica Records was headquartered in São Paulo.

== See also ==
- List of record labels
