= Luiz Americano =

Brazilian musician and composer, 1900 - 1960

- Born: 27 February 1900; Aracaju, Brazil
- Died: 29 March 1960 (aged 60); Rio de Janeiro, Brazil
- Other names: Luís Americano; Luiz Americano Rego; Luiz Americano do Rego
- Occupations: musician and composer
- Years active: late 1920s – 1959
- Known for: choro compositions; saxophone performance
- Notable work: É do que há; Lágrimas de virgem; Numa Seresta

Luiz Americano (27 February 1900 – 29 March 1960) was a Brazilian choro musician and composer. He was best known as a clarinetist, saxophonist and recording artiste.

== Early life ==
Luiz Americano (also known as Luís Americano, Luiz Americano Rego and Luiz Americano do Rego) was born on 27 February 1900 in Aracaju where his father, Jorge Americano, was a bandmaster. He began studying music with his father when he was 13. In 1918, he joined a military band in the army in Aracaju. He was transferred to Maceió and then Rio de Janeiro.

== Musical career ==
After leaving the army in 1922, he joined several orchestras to perform, compose and record popular music, especially in the choro genre, as well as popularising the saxophone. He worked with Justo Nieto, Raul Lipoff, Simon Bountman and Romeu Silva. His first recording was in 1927, playing saxophone in his own compositions of a waltz Leda and choro Sentimento. He spent a short time in Argentina from 1928 until 1930. This included being a member of Adolfo Carabelli's orchestra as well as Gordon Stretton's touring group for three months in 1928. The peak of his career was in the 1930s and 1940s being successful as both composer and soloist especially in the choro genre. His choro compositions from 1932 onwards, such as É do Que há established his reputation. He was in demand as a session saxophonist and clarinetist as well as being a member of longer-lasting groups. He is featured in recordings on the Odeon and several other labels. In 1932 he joined Pixinguinha and Donga in the Velha Guarda group. He also performed with Bonfiglio de Oliveira. In 1937 he joined the Trio Carioca with pianist Radamés Gnattali and Luciano Perrone on drums. In 1940, he was among those selected by Pixinguinha to contribute to a Leopold Stokowski's recording to depict Latin America. He also recorded with several singers of the time, including Carmen Miranda and Nélson Gonçalves. He was a studio musician for Rádio Mayrink Veiga (1930-1950) and Rádio Nacional (1950-1960).

He continued to perform and record throughout his life. In the 1940s he recorded on the RCA Victor label and on the Todamérica label in 1953. He released his final album, Por que choras, saxofone? (Why do you cry, saxophone?) in the final six months of his life when he was unwell. He died in the Brás de Pina district of Rio de Janeiro, 29 March 1960.

His compositions continue to be released in new formats as well as recorded by others. The album Luiz Americano - Saxofone, why do you cry? was released on CD in 2001 by Intercdrecords where artistes including Érica Rego and the Orlando Brothers performed his compositions.

== Published songs and recordings ==
Americano's most famous works are the choros É do que há and Numa Seresta and the waltz Lágrimas de virgem. His published compositions and songs include:

- Antigamente era assim (It used to be like this)
- Ao luar (In the moonlight)
- Assim mesmo (Like that)
- Atraente (Attractive) (with J. Mesquita)
- Calamitoso
- Chorinho do Pacaembu (with Ubirajara dos Santos)
- Dancing avenida (Dancing avenue)
- Dindinha
- É do que há (It's what it is)
- Estes são outros quinhentos (These are other five hundred)
- Eu te quero bem (I love you I want it well)
- Garrinha
- Intrigas do boteco do Padilha (Intrigues from the Padilha's bar)
- Iolanda Pereira
- Sorriso de Cristal (crystal smile) (with E. Rego)

=== Recordings ===
Americano's recordings include: Leda/Sentimento (1927) Odeon 78

- Calamitoso/Muito me cantas (1927) Odeon
- Na maciota/Desordeiro (1927) Odeon
- Saxofone (1928) Odeon
- Linda Erika (1929) Odeon
- Dindinha/Lisses (1929) Odeon
- É do que há/Lágrimas de virgem (1931) Odeon
- Numa seresta/Soluços (1931) RCA Victor
- Eu te quero bem/Melodia de um olhar (1932) Odeon
- Ao luar/Assim mesmo (1932) Odeon
