= Lona Warren =

Argentine jazz singer, journalist and composer

Lona Warren (17 December 1922 - 21 July 2007) was an Argentine jazz and blues singer, journalist and composer.

== Early life ==
Dafne Elba Elvira Roca, better known by her stage name Lona Warren, was born in Buenos Aires, Argentina, on 17 December 1922. Her mother's family owned the "El Central" hotel in the city of Villa Gobernador Gálvez, Santa Fe province. The hotel was later run, unsuccessfully, by her father. Warren attended an English language school from the age of three. Her mother died in 1935. Warren continued to live with her father although spent around a year with a family in Rosario. At the age of 14, through listening to recordings, she realised that she liked jazz. Some time later, she travelled to Buenos Aires with her father to stay with an aunt and cousin, Orlando, a young fan of jazz music. Father and daughter stayed in Buenos Aires and her education continued, first at Pensionado de las Madres Franciscanas and then at the Domingo Faustino Sarmiento teacher training college. Warren completed her training as an English teacher at Codwell Academy around the age of 20 and could then be employed in this profession. She was proficient in French, Portuguese and Italian as well as English.

== Career ==
While at the Codwell Academy, she met Raúl Sánchez Reynoso, the director of the Santa Paula Serenaders orchestra, who hired her as a singer. Her first appearance was 15 November 1942 and she was an immediate success.

She adopted a stage name at Sánchez Reynoso's suggestion and chose Lona Warren. Multiple accounts tell of why she selected this name. She has said she chose 'Lona' from the writer Lona O'Day but also that the name was inspired by her cousin, boxer Amílcar Brusa, saying that canvas (lona in Spanish) was the characteristic feature of boxing. She said that the surname Warren was inspired by the partnership of composers and lyricists Harry Warren and Mack Gordon. During her career, she was given the pseudonym "Lady Crooner".

By 1943, she had performed with Joe Ríspoli in Cuatro Reyes y una Reina, Don Dean and appeared on Radio Belgrano with big band leader Raúl Marengo. In 1946 she joined the third formation of the Cotton Pickers band. She then worked for three years with Eduardo Ferri and then as a soloist at the Violin Bar, a Hungarian venue directed by the violinist Sandor. Between 1946 and 1947 she sang with Héctor Lomuto's orchestra.

In 1946, Cotton Pickers 2 was re-formed under Ahmed Ratip, with whom she performed and recorded until 1950. From 1947 until the 1950s, she made about fifteen records with them. In 1950 she appeared on the programme Radio The World with music conducted by Pierre Maffeu. In 1951, she appeared as a soloist on an RCA Victor recording with an orchestra led by Vieri Fidanzini where she sang Hombre al que amo. She also appeared on the cover of Radio Film magazine. In 1951 she joined the roster of soloists on Radio Belgrano, performing with house orchestras led by Raúl Bianchi and Dante Amicarelli.

After returning from a successful tour of Brazil, she retired from performance. After her performance career from 1952 onwards, Warren became a professional journalist, which combined better with her family life. Her reports were mainly on jazz music, and were on the radio as well. She wrote a column for Jazz Magazine called, "They're things from ... Lona Warren." She interviewed Nat King Cole and, for a photo, dressed him as a gaucho and made him drink maté. She also interviewed Ella Fitzgerald. In 1944 she began the Rhythm Cocktail show featuring jazz on Radio Libertad. She hosted a second programme on the same station El show de Lona Warren featuring popular jazz musicians and groups as guests.

She also composed music and lyrics for at least 55 works, either alone or with others including Ray Nolan, José Finkel, Juan Carlos Bera, Inés M. Fernández, Largo Novarro, Chico Novarro, Mito García, Ahmet Ratip, Mario Luis Giménez and Tito Adam. Some of her compositions were recorded by others, such as Abuelita that the singer Elder Barber included in one of her albums released by the Odeón label in Spain in 1958.

In 1973 she returned to performance, appearing at the General San Martín Cultural Center and on television. In 1980 she sang in the show Melodies of Hollywood at the Café Tortoni in Buenos Aires as part of a tribute to Gordon Stretton. Warren continued singing, especially in musical comedies until 22 April 1986. She appeared on the program Los Miedos on Channel 9 in 1982.

She died in Buenos Aires on the 21st of July, 2007.
