= The Versatile Four =

American ragtime and jazz band, 1910–1927

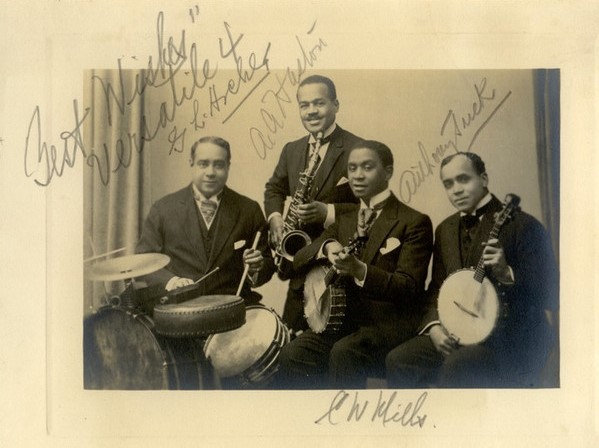

Background information
- Also known as: The Versatile Three
- Origin: New York City, U.S.
- Genres: Ragtime, jazz
- Years active: 1910–1927
- Past members: Tony Tuck; Charlie Mills; Charlie Johnson; Gus Haston; George Archer; Julius Covington

The Versatile Four, or sometimes The Versatile Three, was an American string band active in the 1910s and 1920s. The band played music usually characterised as ragtime, or early jazz, and was one of the first small groups of African-American musicians to perform in Britain and Europe. They were an offshoot of an earlier ensemble, the Versatile Entertainers Quintet.

== Biography ==
The Versatile Entertainers Quintet are first mentioned in May 1910, performing at James Reese Europe's Clef Club in Harlem, New York City, on a bill that also included dancers Irene and Vernon Castle. In 1913, three members of the Quintet, banjo player and vocals Anthony (Tony) Tuck (born in Danville, Virginia, 1879– after 1936), pianist and vocals Charles Wenzel Mills (born in Quincy, Illinois, 1884–1946), and drummer and cellist Charles Wesley Johnson (born in Louisville, Kentucky, 1885–?), accompanied Irene and Vernon Castle on a tour of Europe.

In Europe, the trio of Mills, Tuck and Johnson collaborated with multi-instrumentalist (especially banjoline and vocals) Gus Haston (Augustus Adolphus Haston, born in St Louis, Missouri, 1881–1967) to form the Versatile Four. Haston had studied music in Toronto, toured Europe in 1905 as a mandolin player in Ernest Hogan's band, the Memphis Students, and settled in London. The Versatile Four toured in Britain, playing as music hall entertainers, and at some venues associated with entertainer Gordon Stretton, English-born but of mixed Jamaican and Irish heritage. They also toured in Europe, but returned to the United States after the start of the First World War. After finding little work in the U.S., they returned to London in 1915, and remained for some ten years, playing at the London Pavilion Theatre, Murray's Cabaret Club in Soho, and elsewhere. Their syncopated music became popular, and they became a favorite of the Prince of Wales, later Edward VIII.

In February 1916, they made their first recordings, including a version of Wilbur Sweatman's "Down Home Rag" released on the "His Master's Voice" label. The band comprised Haston and Tuck on banjolins, Mills on piano, and Johnson on snare drum and woodblock. Sweatman's biographer Mark Berresford wrote that, led by Haston, they "turn in an extremely lively, nay rowdy, performance... in a style that is a fascinating amalgam of country string band and Clef Club banjo orchestra, complete with shouted encouragements to both the imaginary dancers and to one another, and overzealous percussion from drummer Charlie Johnson. The wildness and abandon of the performance is capped by the shouted exclamation by Haston of 'Howww's that?' after the final cymbal crash". "Down Home Rag" has been said to have "a credible claim... as the first jazz record", pre-dating recordings by the Original Dixieland Jazz Band by several months. At the same session they also recorded "Circus Day in Dixie", described by music historian David Wondrich as "...with its minstrel themes transformed by pure musical testosterone.. one of the hottest records I've ever heard."

By 1917, Haston started performing primarily on saxophone, as well as vocals, and by the end of the year Johnson returned to the United States, leaving the Versatile Three to fulfil their British and European engagements, occasionally working with either Stretton or drummer George Archer. In 1919, the trio recorded for the Edison Bell Winner label, and on some recordings the following year added a second saxophone, possibly Edmund Jenkins. They recorded as the Diplomat Orchestra in 1921, and also accompanied Dewey Wineglass' Dancing Demons, a tap-dancing troupe. They made their final recordings in England in 1923, and returned to the U.S. in 1926. Mills left the band, to be replaced by Julius Maceo Covington, but the group disbanded in early 1927.

Covington died in Paris soon afterwards. Haston made some recordings as a vocalist for the Victor label in 1931. Tuck traveled to Argentina, where in 1936 he played in a band led by Gordon Stretton. Mills died in Chicago in 1946, and Haston died in New York in 1967.

A compilation of the group's recordings in 1919 and 1920, The Versatile Three / Four – The Earliest Black String Bands Vol. 3, compiled by Johnny Parth, was issued by Document Records in 1998.

An entirely different group also called the Versatile Four, comprising white musicians, recorded for the Parlophone label in the 1930s.
