= Adolfo Carabelli =

Argentine tango and jazz musician and composer. 1893 - 1947

Adolfo Leandro Carabelli (8 September 1893 - 25 January 1947) was an Argentine piano player, composer and bandleader (tango musical genre) during the Golden Age of tango.

== Biography ==
He was born on 8 September 1893.

Carabelli led his own orchestra Adolfo Carabelli y su Orquesta (sometimes referred to as Adolfo Carabelli y su Orquesta Típica or Adolfo Carabelli y su Jazz Band). Among the performers in it for a short time around 1928 was Luiz Americano. He also led for some period the renowned Orquesta Típica Victor.

Among the best-known tangos of the Carabelli tango orchestra are “Mi refugio” (1931); “Cantando”, “Felicia” (1932), “Por dónde andará” (1932), “Inspiración” (1932), “Mar adentro” (1933) and others.

He died on 25 January 1947.
