= Charles F. Inston =

British photographer

Charles Frederick Inston
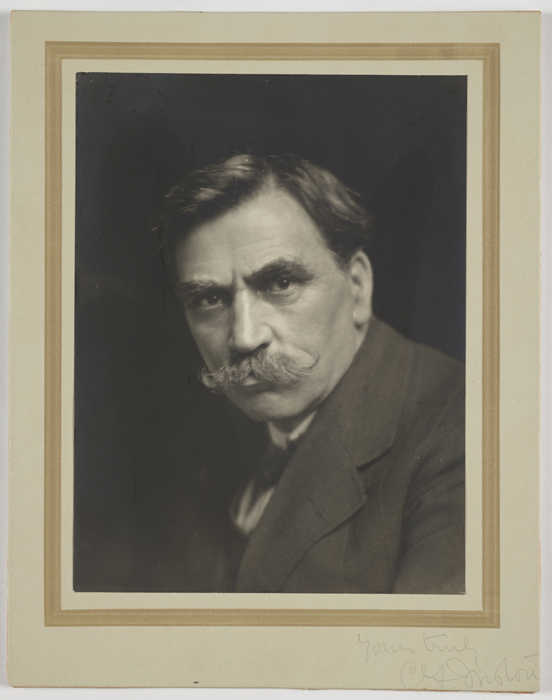
- Charles F. Inston
- Born: October 1855; Birmingham, England
- Died: 4 May 1917 (aged 61); Liverpool, England
- Occupations: Businessman in general and photolithographic printing
- Known for: Photographer

Charles Frederick Inston (1855–1917) was a British pictorialist photographer. He was elected a member of the Royal Photographic Society in 1896 and Fellow in 1901 and was organiser of the Northern Photographic Exhibition from 1904. He became Secretary then President of the Liverpool Amateur Photographic Society.

== Personal life ==
Inston was born in Birmingham in October 1855. His parents were Joseph and Jane (née Barnes) Instone. He had a general and lithographic printing business in central Liverpool from at least 1879. He was a freemason with membership of the Kirkdale Lodge. In 1881 he married.

He experienced ill health for several years in later life and died on 4 May 1917.

== Career as a photographer ==
Inston photographed nature, especially landscapes and seascapes as well as genre pictures in towns, particularly Liverpool. He used a hand-held camera and sometimes asked people to pose in his photographs.

He was awarded a bronze medal for his photograph The Lowest Ebb in 1897. His photograph Storm Breaking in the 1898 Royal Photographic Society exhibition made an impact on his contemporaries. His photograph Whence and Whither? of a sea wave was included in a compilation of the photograms of the year in 1900. In 1902 one of his photographs was published in the American magazine Camera Notes edited by Alfred Stieglitz.

He exhibited at the Royal Photographic Society in 1896, 1900, 1902 and 1906, and was elected as a member in 1896 and fellow in 1901. He was a member of the committee for selecting works for the society's exhibitions 1908 - 1912 and council 1912 - 1917. He instigate the society's Northern Photographic Exhibition in 1904, first held in the Walker Art Gallery in Liverpool and then in Manchester and Leeds, inviting fellow council member Frank Sutcliffe as a judge for the 1906 Northern Exhibition in Manchester. The exhibition catalogues for 1904, 1907 and 1911 were printed by Inston's company. He became involved in the organisation of several photographic societies and his exhibition of photographs decreased.

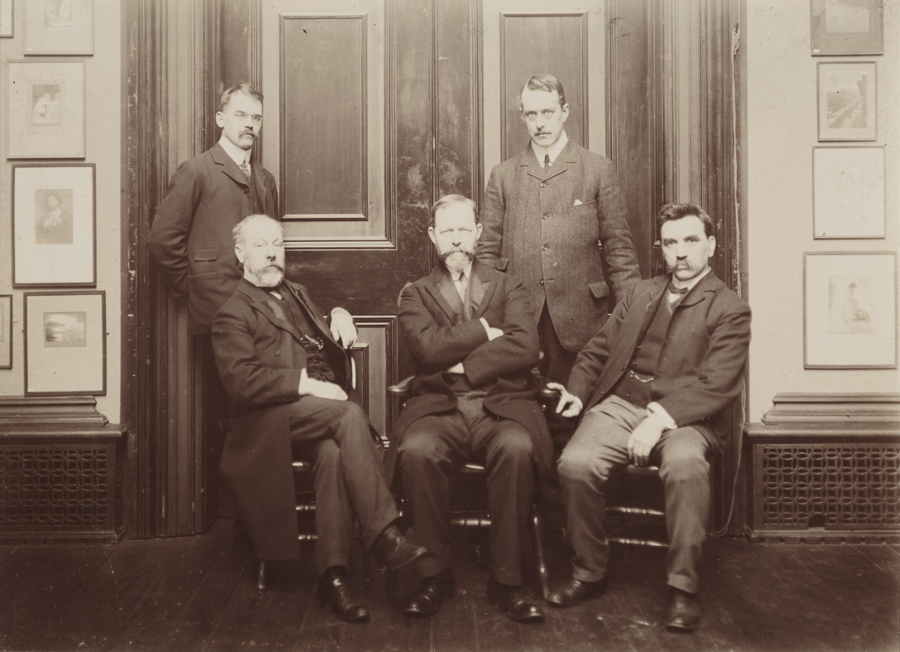
[standing:] C. F. Stuart, J. Dudley Johnston; [sitting:] Dr. J. W. Ellis, Dr. C. Thurstan Holland, Chairman, Charles F. Inston, Secretary - Northern Photographic Exhibition, Liverpool, 1908.

In 1911 he was president of the Lancashire and Cheshire Photographic Union. He became secretary of the Liverpool Amateur Photographic Association in 1909 and was president in 1912 - 1913. When the Liverpool Amateur Photographic Association held an exhibition of the work of Alvin Langdon Coburn in 1906, Inston was part of the group of Liverpool photographers that accompanied Coburn on a visit to Birmingham.

== Legacy ==
Although prints of some of his photographs remain, the majority of his photographs no longer exist. Some of his photographs are included in museum and art collections such as the Minneapolis Institute of Art, Musée Nicéphore-Niépce museum of photography, Philadelphia Museum of Art, and Royal Photographic Society Collection.

There is an album of contact prints from his lantern slides of Liverpool characters and streets from around 1890 in the Liverpool Records Office and some lantern slides held by the Liverpool Amateur Photographic Association. One of Inston's photographs showing a black street trader in Liverpool in 1895 was exhibited in Merseyside Maritime Museum.

There was a retrospective exhibition of some of his surviving work at the Open Eye Gallery, Liverpool in 1979.
