= Camera Notes =

US photographic magazine (1897–1903)

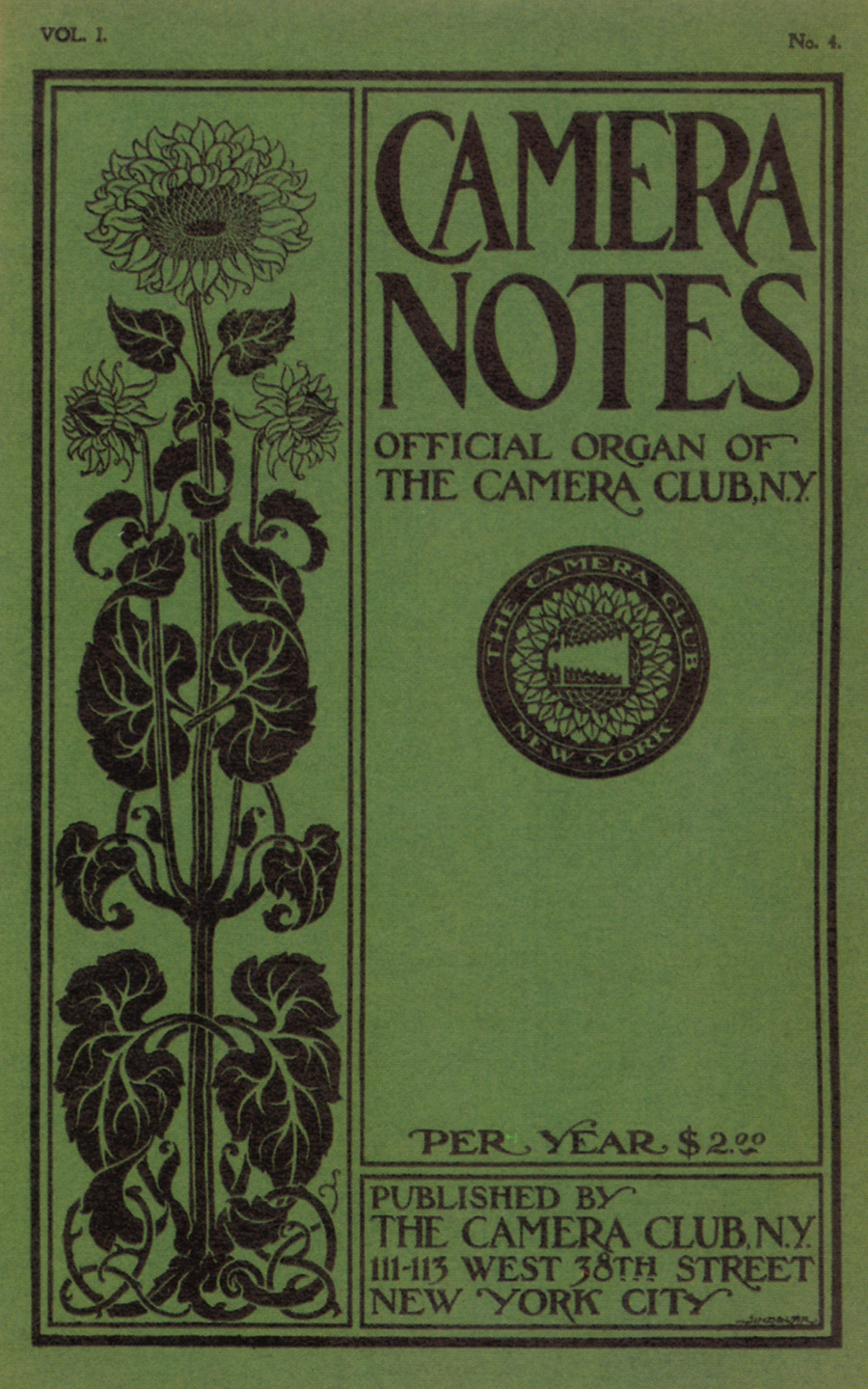
Cover of Camera Notes, Vol 1 No 4, 1898. Cover design by Thomas A. Sindelar.

Camera Notes was a photographic journal published by the Camera Club of New York from 1897 to 1903. It was edited for most of that time by photographer Alfred Stieglitz and was considered the most significant American photography journal of its time. It is valuable today both as a record of photographic aesthetics of the time and for its many high-quality photogravures by photographers such as Stieglitz, James Craig Annan, F. Holland Day, Robert Demachy, Frances Benjamin Johnston, Gertrude Kasebier and Clarence H. White.

== Background ==
In September, 1894, Alfred Stieglitz returned to New York after an extended tour in Europe. He found both the quality and quantity of what he considered to be artistic photography, such as that promoted by the Linked Ring in Britain, was much greater in Europe than in the United States, and he was determined to do something to advance fine art photography in America. He turned to the two major photographic clubs in New York, the Society of Amateur Photographers and the New York Camera Club, for assistance in his mission but received little interest from either organization. The critic Sadakichi Hartmann noted that the clubs at that time were "as good as dead. There was no vitality in them. Photography was merely as pastime to them, and all they had to show were their innumerable portraits, transcripts of nature, views, and snapshots as is in the power of almost anyone to produce."

Stieglitz set about to change this situation, and within eighteen months he and his friends succeeded in bringing about a merger of the two clubs. He immediately took over as Vice President of the newly formed and rejuvenated organization, now called The Camera Club of New York. He envisioned the new organization as the American beacon of fine art photography, and to help promote his vision he proposed expanding the former newsletter of the club into a full-fledged journal with himself as editor. Later Stieglitz would write "As a condition precedent to undertaking this labor of love and enthusiasm, it was stipulated by our Editor [Stieglitz] that he would have unhampered and absolute control over all matters, direct or remote, relating to the conduct of the proposed publications; in short, Camera Notes, while published for the club, was nevertheless an independent institution."

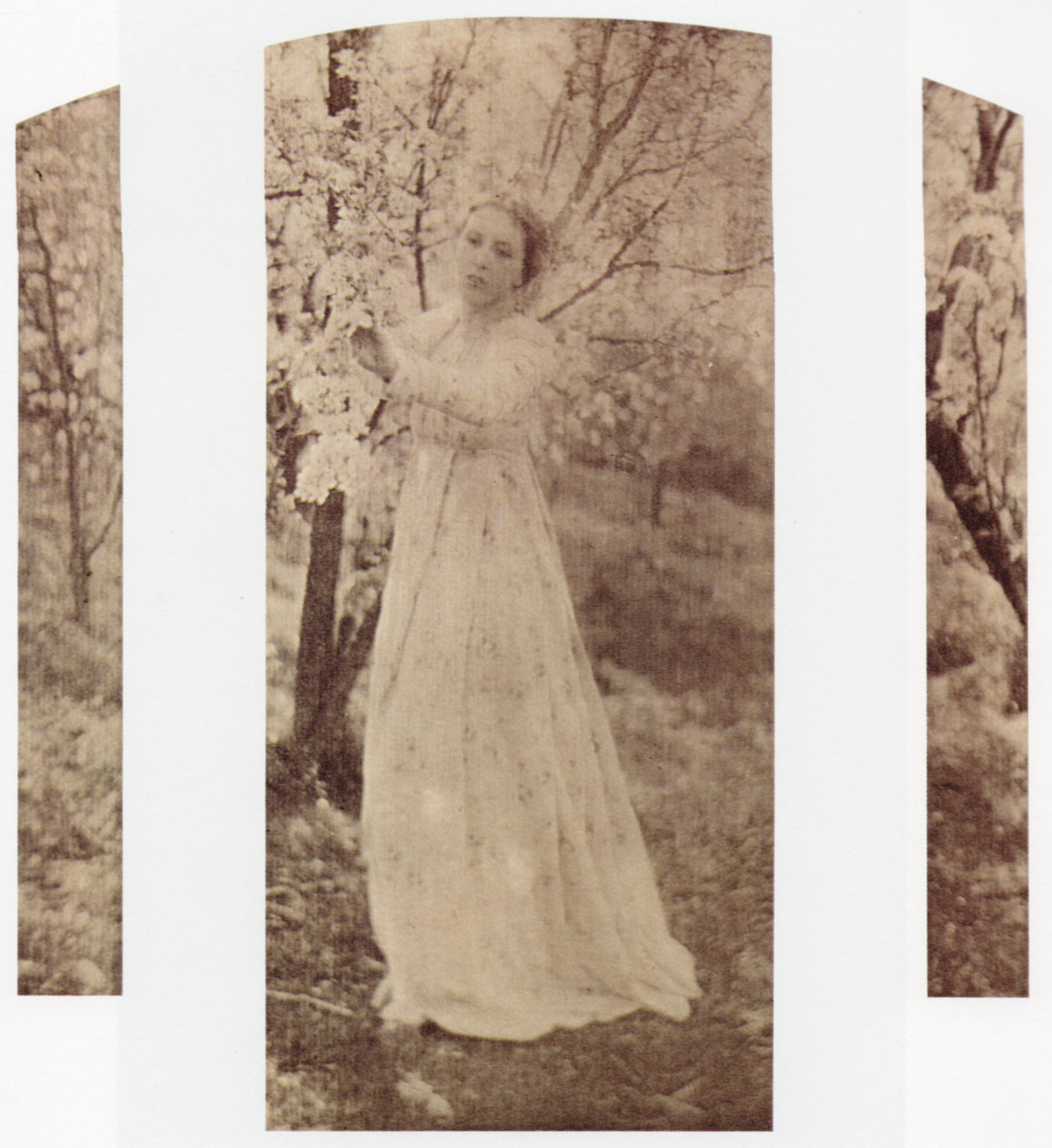
"Spring", by Clarence H. White. Published in Camera Notes, Vol 3 No 2, 1899.

== History and context ==
The first issue of Camera Notes premiered in July, 1897. Camera Notes was immediately well-received, and in the second issue Stieglitz published a sampling of the praise that had come from other photographic magazines. Britain's Photogram, for example, said "Camera Notes is such a fine publication that we hesitate to use the adjectives necessary to describe it." With the second issue Stieglitz hit his editorial stride, with a full range of photographs and articles that included F. Holland Day writing on "Art and the Camera" and Lee Ferguson lamenting on "Our Lack of Exhibitions". With Camera Notes Stieglitz established the pattern he would continue for the rest of his life of exerting complete editorial and aesthetic control over all aspects of the publication. Occasionally he would allow some articles to express ideas contrary to his, mostly for the sake of allowing him to rebut them, but in general his opinions dominated the visual and literary contributions to the magazine.

Stieglitz also instilled in Camera Notes his belief that photographers should be familiar with other arts, since he saw his primary mission as promoting photography as a fine art itself. He included articles on Impressionism, Symbolism, genre painting and portraiture, and commentaries on aesthetics from well-known art critics and artists like Sadakichi Hartmann and Arthur Wesley Dow.

At the same time, Stieglitz regularly took the opportunity to promote his own work, and while he was editor he published twenty-two of his own photos in the magazine, including two images twice.

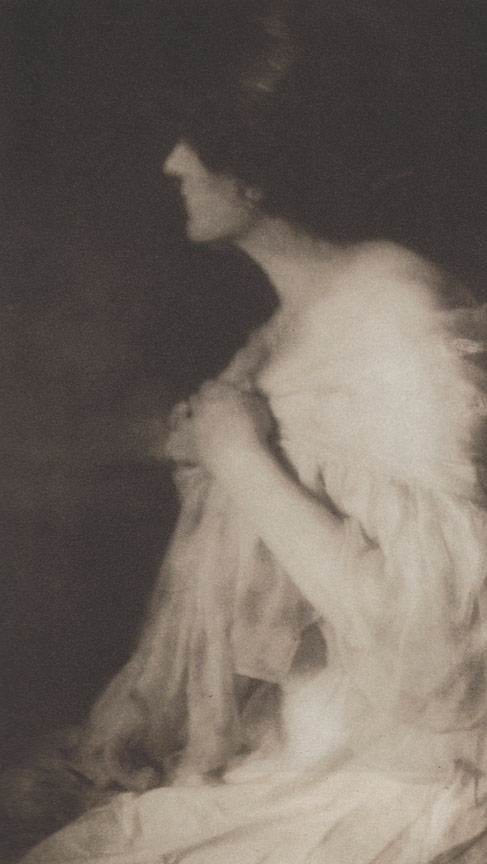
"Miss M", by Rose Clark and Elizabeth Flint Wade. Published in Camera Notes, Vol 4 No 4, 1900.

For much of the first year, Stieglitz emphasized foreign photographers in the magazine as encouragement to his U.S. colleagues to develop a uniquely American school of photography. Within a short time, he was rewarded for his efforts by finding a new level of photographic aesthetics among his close colleagues. For the remainder of the publication's life, American photographers were dominated the highest quality reproductions included in Camera Notes. Of the fifty photographers whose work was included either as photogravures or as tipped-in silver prints, thirty-five were Americans.

While Stieglitz sought independence from the Camera Club in his editorial work, very few of photographers whose work he reproduced came from outside the membership of the club. The most prominent of the non-Club members who were featured were F. Holland Day and Clarence H. White. Both figure prominently in Stieglitz's concurrent efforts to promote pictorialism through his establishment of the Photo-Secession.

Eventually, Stieglitz's autocratic direction of the journal came under fire from the membership of the club. In spite of the record of reproducing work mostly by Club members, some members felt Stieglitz was spending too much time and effort promoting activities outside of the club. He also faced criticism from more progressive members who felt that much of the work Stieglitz chose fell into the same tired aesthetics that he originally campaigned against. In late 1900 a special meeting of the club was held to address these issues, and, while he appeared open to a democratic discussion of the journal, Stieglitz became upset that his leadership and aesthetic integrity were being questioned. He eventually became disillusioned with all of the in-fighting, and in early 1901 he announced that he would step down as editor after one more year.

In May, 1902, Juan C. Abel took over as editor. Abel, who was the club's librarian, had assisted Stieglitz with two issues of Camera Notes and had experience working on other photographic magazines. He sought to emphasize the change in editorial direction by redesigning the magazine, putting a new cover in place along with a more sophisticated layout. He also introduced the relatively bold concept of including at least one tipped-in, original photographs in each issue. In spite his editorial changes, however, Abel did not have the aesthetic sense of Stieglitz, and the overall quality of the images included in the magazine, including the original prints, was inferior when compared to the previous five years.

When Stieglitz began independently publishing his own journal Camera Work in 1903, interest in Camera Notes quickly flagged. The photographers and critics who were at the forefront of fine art photography at the time recognized that, for all his shortcomings, Stieglitz really was the driving force in the movement.

The last issue of Camera Notes appeared in December 1903. A column under this name and written by members of the Camera Club subsequently appeared in two other magazines, but it contained only news and notes about the club itself.

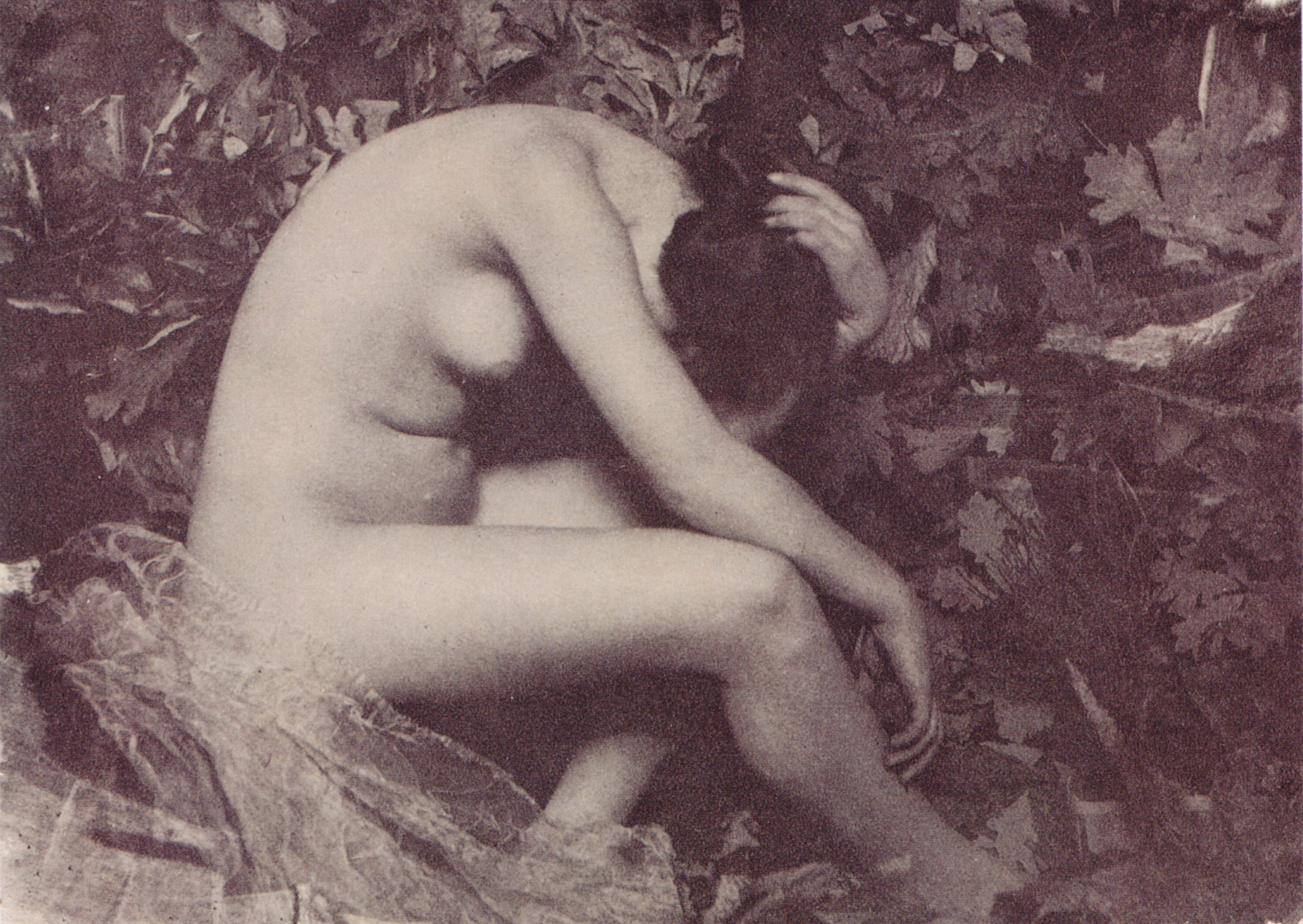
"La Cigale", by Frank Eugene. Published in Camera Notes, Vol 3 No 4, 1900.

== Design and production ==
Each of the twenty-four issues of the magazine measured 10 1/4 in × 7 1/2 in (26 cm × 19 cm). Volumes 1-4 displayed a green Art Nouveau cover with a design attributed to Thomas A. Sindelar, a student of Alphonse Mucha. There were numerous halftone reproduction of photos in each issue, but what made the journal stand out were the hand-pulled photogravures. At least two and as many as four meticulously printed photogravures were included in each issue. In addition there were commentaries, criticism and reviews by important photographers and critics of the time. In an average issue, about half of the articles dealt with individual photographers and aesthetic issues, and the rest covering technical matters and notices and reviews of international exhibitions. As Stieglitz biographer Katherine Hoffman points out, "Each issue of Camera Notes was an art object itself, with its finely printed photogravures, well-designed layout and range of articles and text."

== Issues and contents ==
Camera Notes was published quarterly from July, 1897 to December, 1902, and two more issues were published in 1903, for a total of twenty-four issues. The following is a complete list of the photogravures and halftones that appeared in the issues. For a detailed list of the published articles, see Peterson (1993).

Volume 1 Number 1, July 1897

- Photographs: one by Emilie V. Clarkson; one by A. Horsely Hinton; one by John W. McKecknie; one by William B. Post; two by Alfred Stieglitz; one by Daniel K. Young.

Volume 1 Number 2, October 1897

- Photographs: one by W. H. Collins; one by Fred Holland Day; one by Wilhelm von Gloeden; one by Karl Greger; one by Hugo Henneberg; one by Constant Puyo; two by Alfred Stieglitz.

Volume 1 Number 3, January 1898

- Photographs: one by Robert Demachy; four by Rudolf Eickemeyer, Jr.; three by Emma J. Farnsworth; one by John Gear; one by Constant Puyo.

Volume 1 Number 4, April 1898

- Photographs: one by J. Craig Annan; six one by Zaida Ben-Yusuf; one by Charles I. Berg; one by F.A. Engle; one by William D. Murphy; one by William B. Post; one by Adolphus H. Stoiber; one by Henry Troth.

Volume 2 Number 1, July 1898

- Photographs: one by Hewitt A. Beasley; six one by Zaida Ben-Yusuf; one Emilie V. Clarkson; three by F. Holland Day; one by Robert Demachy; two by E. Lee Ferguson; one by Wilhelm von Gloeden; one by Karl Greger; one by William B. Post; two by Alfred Stieglitz.

Volume 2 Number 2, October 1898

- Photographs: one by Ernest R. Ashton; five by William E. Carlin; one by Emilie V. Clarkson; one by F. Holland Day; three by Rudolf Eickemeyer Jr.; two by Frances Benjamin Johnston; one by Henry Troth.

Volume 2 Number 3, January 1899

- Photographs: one by Charles I. Berg; one by Tom Bright; one by F. Holland Day; one by William A. Fraser; one by W. M. Hollinger; one by Frances Benjamin Johnston; three by Alfred Stieglitz.

Volume 2 Number 4, April 1899

- Photographs: one by William E. Carlin; one by John Dumont; one by W. M. Hollinger; one by Frances Benjamin Johnston; five by Gertrude Käsebier; one by Alphonse Montant; one by William D. Murphy; one by Arthur Scott; two by Alfred Stieglitz; one by Hans Watzek; two by Mathilde Weil.

Volume 3 Number 1, July 1899

- Photographs: one by Zaida Ben-Yusuf; one by James L. Breese & Rudolf Eickemeyer Jr.; one by Cox [no first name given]; one by Frank Eugene; one by A. Horsely Hinton; four by Gertrude Käsebier; one by René Le Bègue; one by Clarence H. White.

Volume 3 Number 2, October 1899

- Photographs: one by J. Craig Annan; one by John Beeby; one by Charles I. Berg; one by J. Edgar Bull; one by William J. Cassard; two by Ferdinand A. Clark; two by F. Holland Day; one by Rudolf Eickemeyer Jr.; one by Wilhelm von Gloeden; three by A. Hinton Horsley; one by William D. Murphy; one by George L. Ronalds; one by Elizabeth A. Slade; one by Alfred Stieglitz; one by Clarence H. White; one by Myra A. Wiggins.

Volume 3 Number 3, January 1900

- Photographs: one by Charles I. Berg; one by Eustace G. Calland; one by Desire Declercq; one by Robert Demachy; one by Pierre Dubreuil; one by Rudolf Eickemeyer Jr.; one by Emma J. Farnsworth; one by Hugo Henneberg; one by Sidney Herbert; two by A. Hinton Horsley; five by Joseph T. Keiley; one by Heinrich Kuehn; one by Léonard Misonne; one by George W. Norris; one by J. Henry Quinn; two by Eva Watson-Schütze; one by Mathilde Weil; one by Clarence H. White.

Volume 3 Number 4, April 1900

- Photographs: nine by Frank Eugene; one by Dallett Fuguet; two by Gertrude Käsebier; one by Joseph T. Keiley; four by Alfred Stieglitz.

Volume 4 Number 1, July 1900

- Photographs: one by Frank C. Baker; one by Rudolf Eickemeyer Jr.; one by Hugo Henneberg; one by Theodore & Oscar Hofmeister; three by Gertrude Käsebier; six by Joseph T. Keiley; one by S. H. Lifshey; one by Oscar Maurer; one by Ralph W. Robinson.

Volume 4 Number 2, October 1900

- Photographs: one by J. Wesley Allison; one by Lionel C. Bennett; two by William E. Carlin; one by J. Wells Champney; two by Frederick Colburn Clarke: one by A. Walpole Cragie; two by Rudolf Eickemeyer Jr.; one by Dallett Fuguet; one by Karl Greger; one by Gertrude Käsebier; one by J. Ridgeway Moore; one by A. W. Scott; one by Arthur Scott; one by T. O’Connor Sloane Jr.; one by Sydney A. Smith; one by Alfred Stieglitz; one by Adolphus H. Stoiber; one by John Francis Strauss; one by Henry Troth; three by Eva Watson-Schütze; one by Clarence H. White; one by Myra A. Wiggins; one by J. Dunbar Wright.:

Volume 4 Number 3, January 1901

- Photographs: four by J. Craig Annan; one by Frank Eugene; one by Gertrude Käsebier; one by Heinrich Kuehn; one by Robert S. Redfield; five by Edward Steichen; two by Alfred Stieglitz; one by Eva Watson-Schütze; one by Hans Watzek; one by Clarence H. White.

Volume 4 Number 4, April 1901

- Photographs: one by Ernest R. Ashton; one by Rose Clark and Elizabeth Flint Wade; one by W. E. Johnson & Frank M. Hale; four by Rodrigues Ottolengui; one by Robert S. Redfield; one by Mary R. Standbery; one by Alfred Stieglitz; three by Clarence H. White.

Volume 5 Number 1, July 1901

- Photographs: one by Prescott Adamson; seven by Frederick Colburn Clarke; one by William B. Dyer; two by David Octavius Hill; three by Joseph T. Keiley; one by Leonard Misonne; one by William B. Post; five by Frank Meadow Sutcliffe.

Volume 5 Number 2, October 1901

- Photographs: one by James L. Breese; one by Charles A. Darling; one by Julian A. Dimock; one by Frank Eugene; one by E. Lee Ferguson; one by A. C. Gould; one by Walter C. Harris; one by F. Huber Hoge & Tom Hadaway; one by Gertrude Käsebier; one by Joseph T. Keiley; one by Sarah H. Ladd; one by Horace A. Latimer; one by Charles H. Loeber; one by Lewis M. McCormick; one by J. Ridgeway Moore; one by William J. Mullins; one by William W. Renwick; one by A. W. Scott; one by Benjamin Sharp; one by Edward Steichen; one by Charles W. Stevens; two by Alfred Stieglitz; one by Adolphus H. Stoiber; one by Clarence H. White.

Volume 5 Number 3, January 1902

- Photographs: one by C. Yarnall Abbott; one by J. Craig Annan; one by Will A. Colby; one by Heinrich Kuehn; two by Rodrigues Ottolengui; three by Alfred Stieglitz.

Volume 5 Number 4, April 1902

- Photographs: one by John. G Bullock; one by George Davison; one by Frederick Detlefsen; three by Hugo Henneberg; five by Heinrich Kuehn; one by Robert S. Redfield, one by Alfred Stieglitz.

Volume 6 Number 1, July 1902

- Photographs: one by Arthur E. Beecher; one by Robert Demachy; one by Mary Devens; one by Rudolf Eickemeyer Jr.; one by Albert Fichte; one by Dallet Fuguet; one by Charles F. Inston; one by Gertrude Käsebier; one by Oscar Maurer; one by Alfred Stieglitz; one by Clarence H. White.

Volume 6 Number 2, October 1902

- Photographs: six by Frederick Colburn Clarke; two by Harry Countant; one by Edward W. Keck; one by Horace A. Latimer; one by Will H. Moses; one by William D. Murphy; one by Myra A. Wiggins; two by Osborne I. Yellott.

Volume 6 Number 3, February 1903

- Photographs: two by Charles I. Berg; three by Leverett W. Brownell; ten by Ed Heim and E.C. Heim; one by Pirei MacDonalad; one by James Patrick; two by Charles Simpson.

Volume 6 Number 4, December 1903

- Photographs: one by Juan C. Abel; one by Ernest G. Boon; one by Frederick Detlefsen; one by Rudolf Eickemeyer Jr.; one by Walter C. Harris; one by Lewis M. McCormick; one by Adolphus H. Stoiber. one by J.C. Vail.
