= Elizabeth Johnston =

Elizabeth Johnston may refer to:

- Elizabeth Johnston (dressmaker) (?-?), the official royal dressmaker of queen Adelaide and queen Victoria
- Elizabeth Bryant Johnston, (1833–1907) American historian
- Elizabeth Lichtenstein Johnston, American writer
- Elizabeth Parr-Johnston (born 1939), married name Elizabeth Johnston, economist and advisor
- Elizabeth Johnston Patterson (1939–2018), née Elizabeth Johnston, American Democratic politician

== See also ==
- Elizabeth Johnson (disambiguation)
