= Frances Benjamin Johnston =

American photographer, photojournalist (1864–1952)

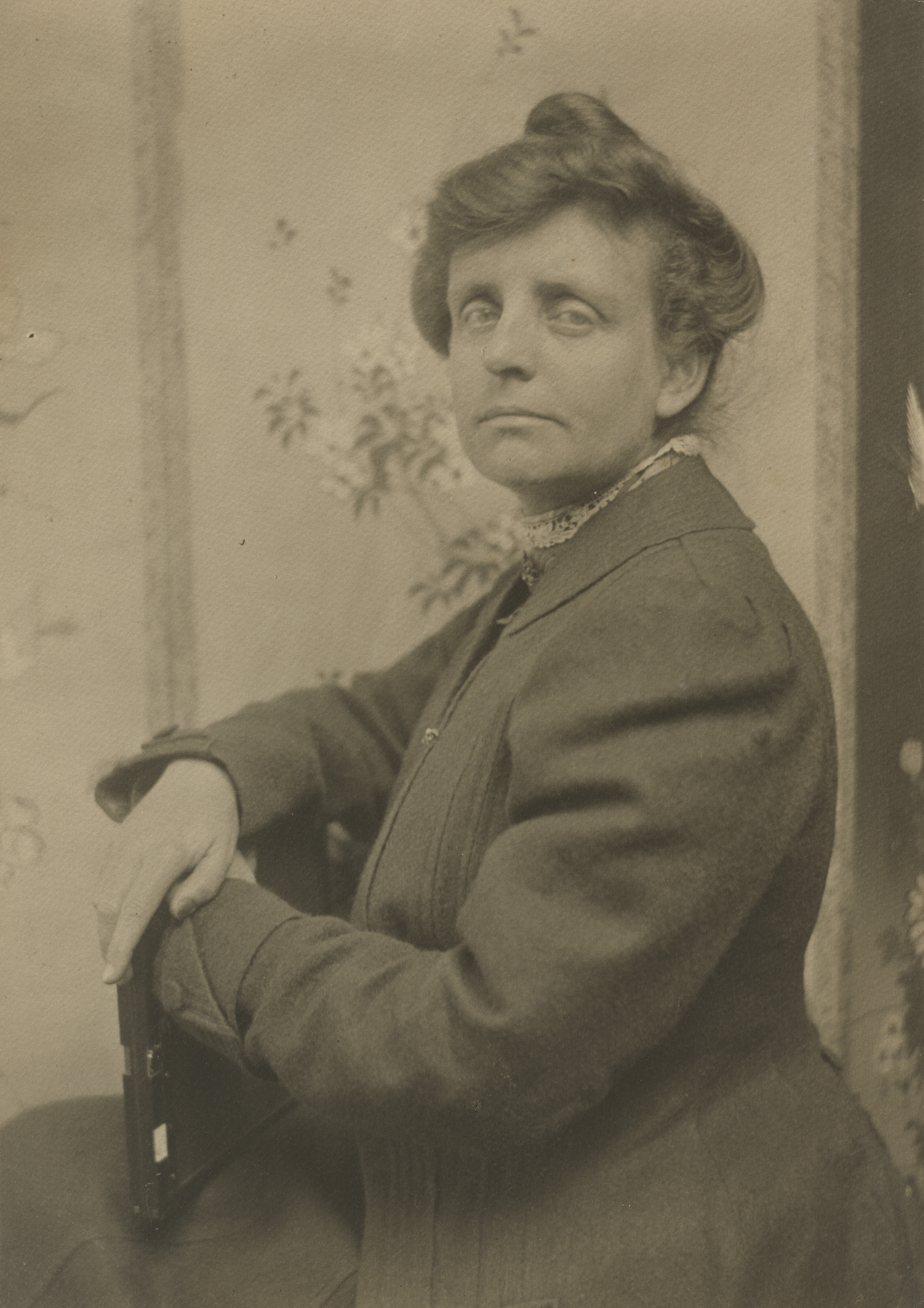
- Johnston in 1905
- Born: January 15, 1864; Grafton, West Virginia, U.S.
- Died: May 16, 1952 (aged 88); New Orleans, Louisiana, U.S.
- Occupations: Photographer, photojournalist

Frances Benjamin Johnston (January 15, 1864 – May 16, 1952) was an American photographer and photojournalist whose career lasted for almost half a century. She is most known for her portraits, images of southern architecture, and various photographic series featuring African Americans and Native Americans at the turn of the twentieth century.

== Early and family life ==
The only surviving child of wealthy and well-connected parents who became established in Washington, D.C., Frances Benjamin Johnston was born in Grafton, West Virginia. Her mother, Frances Antoinette Benjamin, was from Rochester, New York, and could trace her ancestry to Revolutionary War patriot Isaac Clark. She married Anderson Doniphan Johnston, of Maysville, Kentucky, whose father, Dr. William Bryant Johnston, had been born in Virginia and practiced for decades across from Cincinnati, Ohio. Anderson Doniphan Johnston's sister, Elizabeth Bryant Johnston, was a historian. Although his father owned an 11-year-old Black boy in the 1850 census, Anderson Johnston sympathized with the Union, and Grafton was a key depot on the Baltimore and Ohio Railroad as well as Union pay and supply depot during the American Civil War.

Her mother Frances Antoinette Benjamin Johnston survived her husband by nearly two decades. She started in journalism as a special correspondent on Congress and was recognized as one of the first women to write on national affairs. She also worked as a drama critic under the byline "Ione" for the Baltimore Sun.

Her parents moved to the national capital shortly after the Civil War, when she was an infant, possibly in part because they lost three infants during the war years. Her father began his more than three-decade long federal government career as an assistant bookkeeper in the Treasury Department.

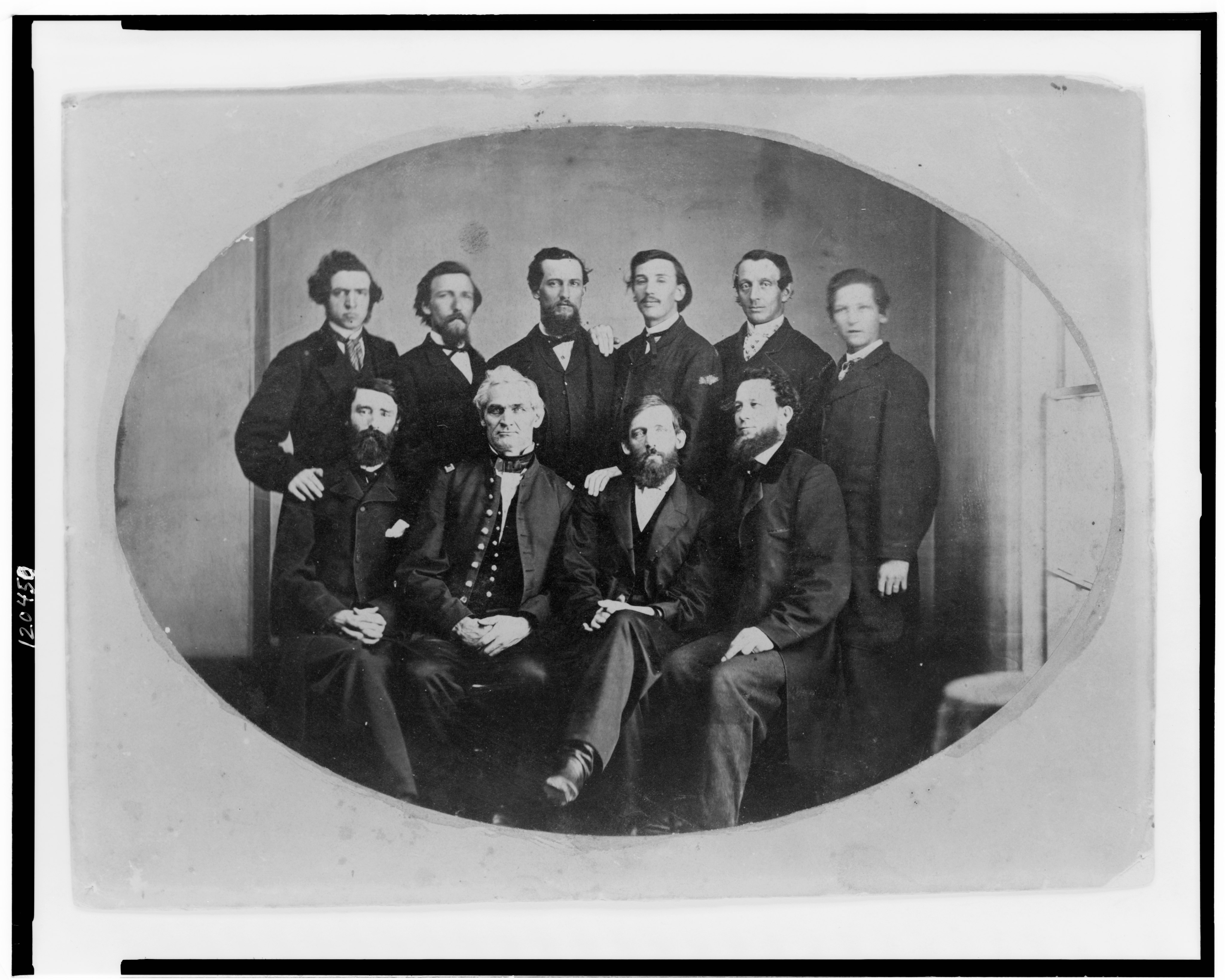
Portrait of ten men including Anderson D. Johnston (seated second from right)

The younger Frances Benjamin Johnston was raised in Washington, D.C., and educated privately. She graduated in 1883 from Notre Dame of Maryland Collegiate Institute for Young Ladies (it developed later into a college and as Notre Dame of Maryland University). Afterward she studied art at the Académie Julian in Paris and the Washington Art Students League.

== Career ==
Johnston began writing articles for periodicals before finding her creative outlet through photography. She was given her first camera by entrepreneur George Eastman, a close friend of the family, and inventor of the new, lighter, Eastman Kodak cameras and film process. She received training in photography and dark-room techniques from Thomas Smillie, director of photography at the Smithsonian.

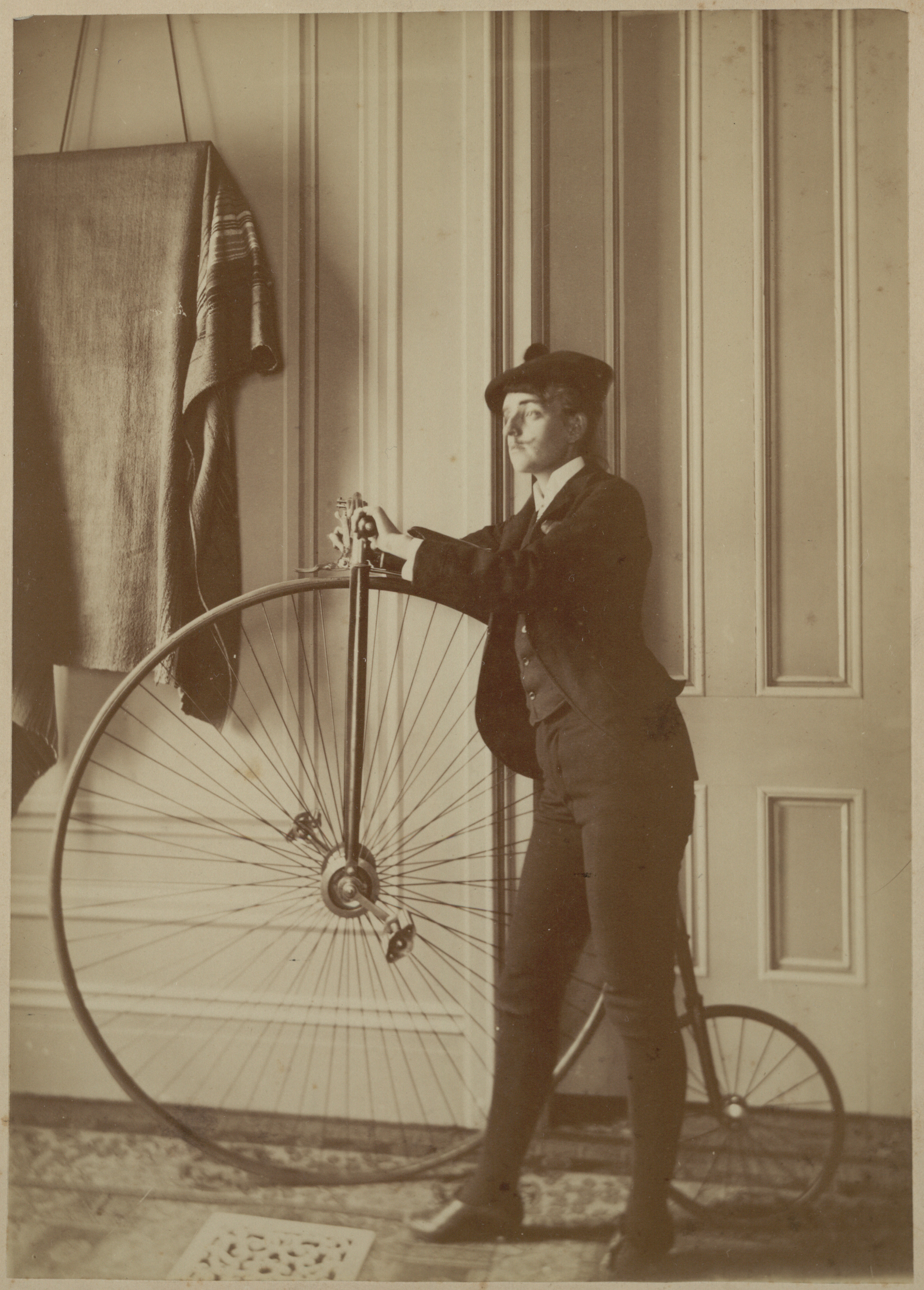
Self-portrait by Johnston, dressed as a man, sporting a fake mustache and holding a bicycle, ca. 1890.

She took portraits of friends, family, and local figures before working as a freelance photographer and touring Europe in the 1890s. There she used her connection to Smillie to visit prominent photographers and gather items for the museum's collections. She gained further practical experience in her craft by working for the newly formed Eastman Kodak company in Washington, D.C., forwarding film for development and advising customers when cameras needed repairs. In 1894, she opened her own photographic studio in Washington, D.C., on V Street between 13th and 14th streets, and at the time was the only woman photographer in the city.

She took portraits of many famous contemporaries, including suffragette Susan B. Anthony, writer Mark Twain and Booker T. Washington, principal of the Tuskegee Institute. Well connected among elite society, she was commissioned by magazines to do "celebrity" portraits, such as Alice Roosevelt's wedding portrait. She was dubbed the "Photographer to the American court." She photographed Admiral Dewey on the deck of the USS Olympia, the children of President Theodore "Teddy" Roosevelt playing with their pet pony at the White House, and the gardens of Edith Wharton's famous villa near Paris. While in Paris, Johnston also photographed Natalie Barney, a famous American heiress and literary salon socialite.

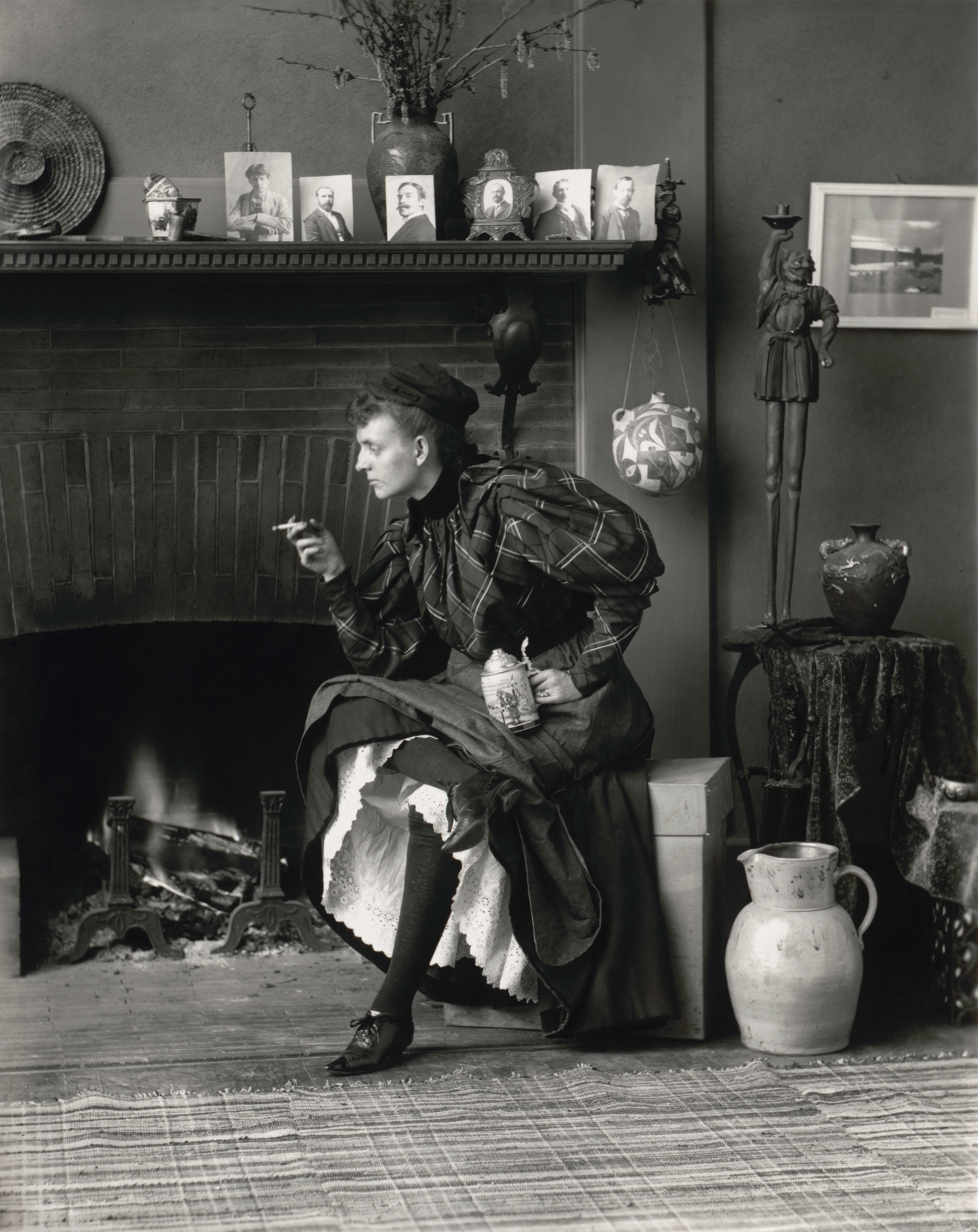
Self Portrait (as New Woman), an 1896 self-portrait taken in her Washington, DC studio

Having grown up in a family that traveled in elite circles of the capital, Johnston built on her connections and familiarity with the Washington political scene: she was appointed as official White House photographer for the Harrison, Cleveland, McKinley, "TR" Roosevelt, and Taft presidential administrations. Perhaps her most famous work, shown here, is her self-portrait as the liberated "New Woman", with petticoats showing and a beer stein in hand.

Johnston advocated for the role of women in the burgeoning art of photography. In 1897 the Ladies' Home Journal published Johnston's article "What a Woman Can Do With a Camera", describing how to achieve artistic and financial success in photography as a profession. With Zaida Ben-Yusuf, Johnston co-curated an exhibition of photographs by twenty-eight women photographers at the 1900 Exposition Universelle in Paris. It afterward traveled to Saint Petersburg and Moscow in the Russian Empire, and to Washington, DC. She traveled widely in her thirties, taking a wide range of documentary and artistic photographs of coal miners, iron workers, women working in New England's textile mills, and sailors being tattooed on board ship, as well as her society commissions. While in England she photographed the stage actress Mary Anderson, who was a friend of her mother.

In 1899, Johnston was commissioned by Hollis Burke Frissell to photograph the buildings and students of the Hampton Normal and Agricultural Institute in Hampton, Virginia in order to show its success. This commission added to her reputation.

This series, documenting the ordinary life of the school, is considered among her most telling work. It was displayed at The Exhibit of American Negroes of the Paris Exposition Universelle in 1900. Her photographs of the Hampton Institute were utilized in Robert Wilson's production of August Strindberg's A Dream Play.

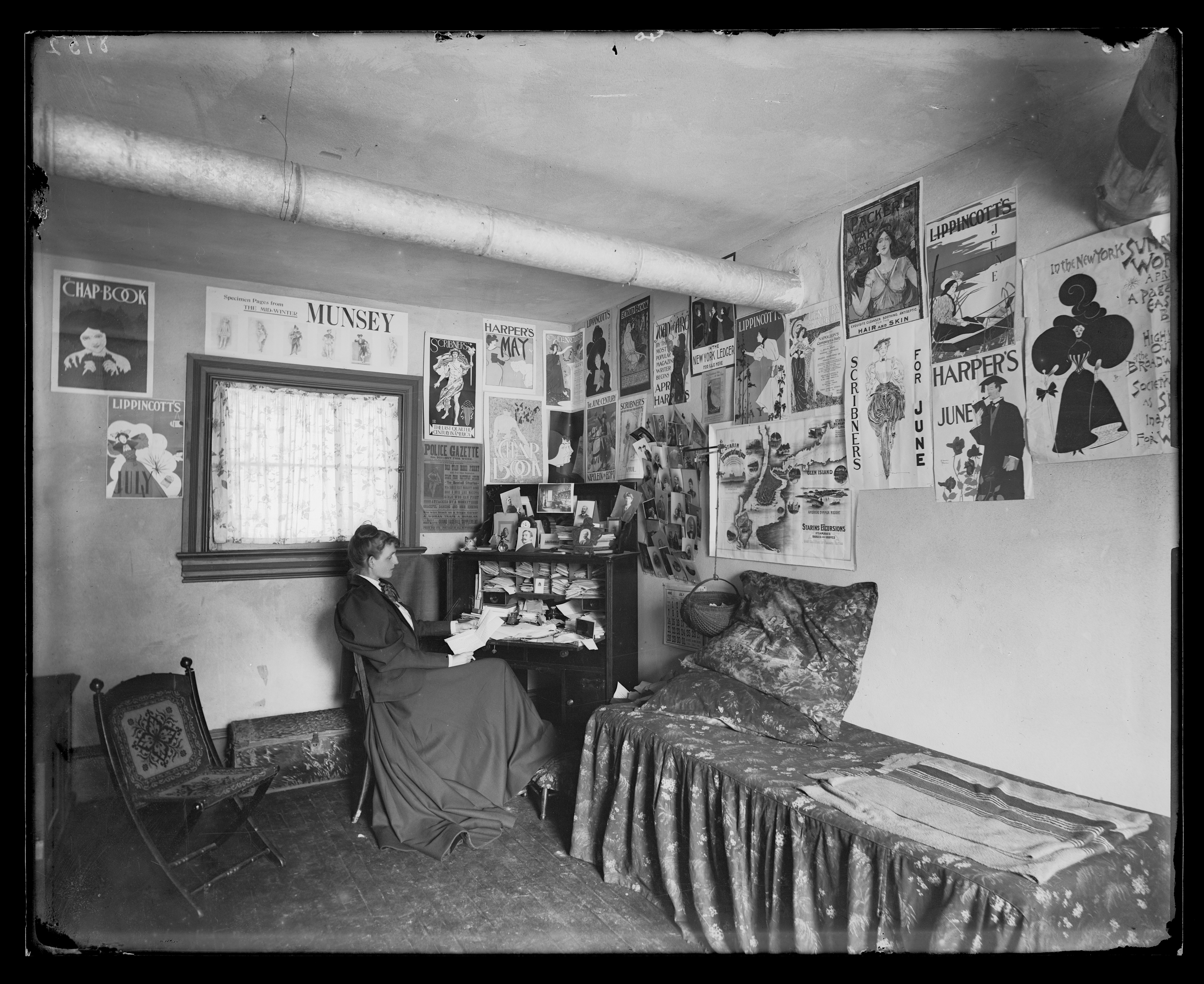
Johnston in her studio, 1896

Johnston photographed events such as world's fairs and peace-treaty signings. She took the last portrait of President William McKinley, at the Pan-American Exposition of 1901 just before he was assassinated there. With her partner, Mattie Edwards Hewitt, a successful freelance home and garden photographer in her own right, Johnston opened a studio in New York City in 1913. Her mother and aunt moved into her new apartment.

Hewitt wrote Johnston love letters over the course of their relationship, which are chronicled in The Woman Behind the Lens: The Life and Work of Frances Benjamin Johnston, 1864–1952. Many of the early letters focused on Hewitt's admiration for Johnston's work, but as their romance progressed, they increasingly expressed her love: "...when I need you or you need me — [we] must hold each other all the closer and with your hand in mine, holding it tight..."

Johnston lectured at New York University on business for women. The pair of women produced a series of studies of New York City architecture through the 1920s. In early 1920 her mother died in New York.

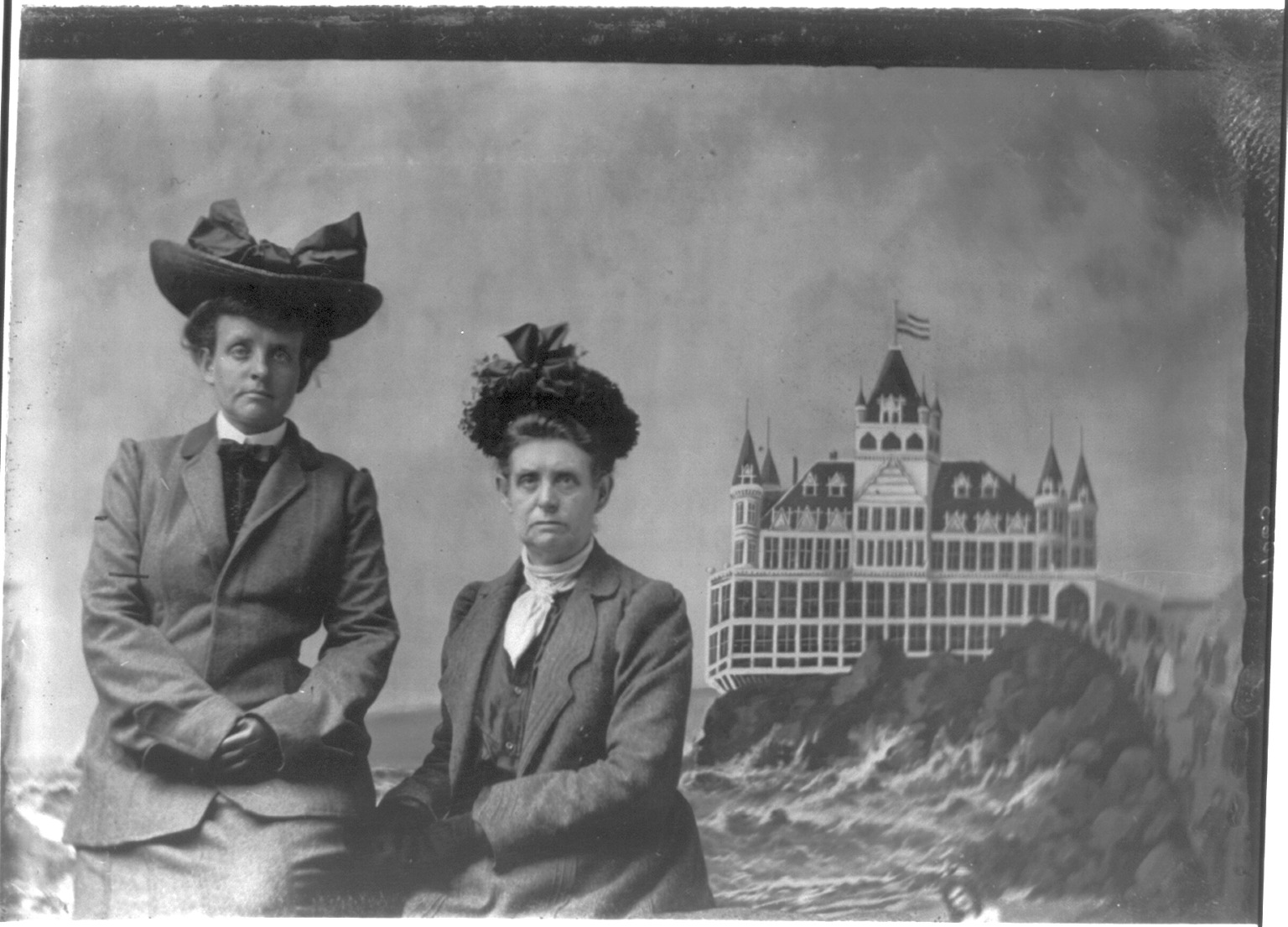
Frances Benjamin Johnston Collection/LOC cph.3a47220. Frances Benjamin Johnston, with Maddie (her mother), before a painted backdrop of the Cliff House in San Francisco, California, 1903

In the 1920s, Johnston became increasingly interested in photographing architecture. As New York changed under pressure of development, she wanted to document buildings and gardens that were falling into disrepair or were about to be redeveloped and lost. As her focus in architecture grew, she became interested in documenting the architecture of the American South.

Johnston was interested in preserving the everyday history of the American South through her art; she accomplished this by photographing barns, inns, and other ordinary structures. She was not interested in photographing the grand homes and plantations of the South, but rather the quickly deteriorating structures in these communities that portrayed the daily life of common southerners.

Her photographs remain an important resource for modern architects, historians and conservationists. In 1928, she exhibited a series of 247 photographs of Fredericksburg, Virginia, ranging from the decaying mansions of the rich to the shacks of the poor. The exhibition was entitled Pictorial Survey—Old Fredericksburg, Virginia—Old Falmouth and Nearby Places and described as "A Series of Photographic Studies of the Architecture of the Region Dating by Tradition from Colonial Times to Circa 1830", and as "An Historical Record and to Preserve Something of the Atmosphere of An Old Virginia Town."

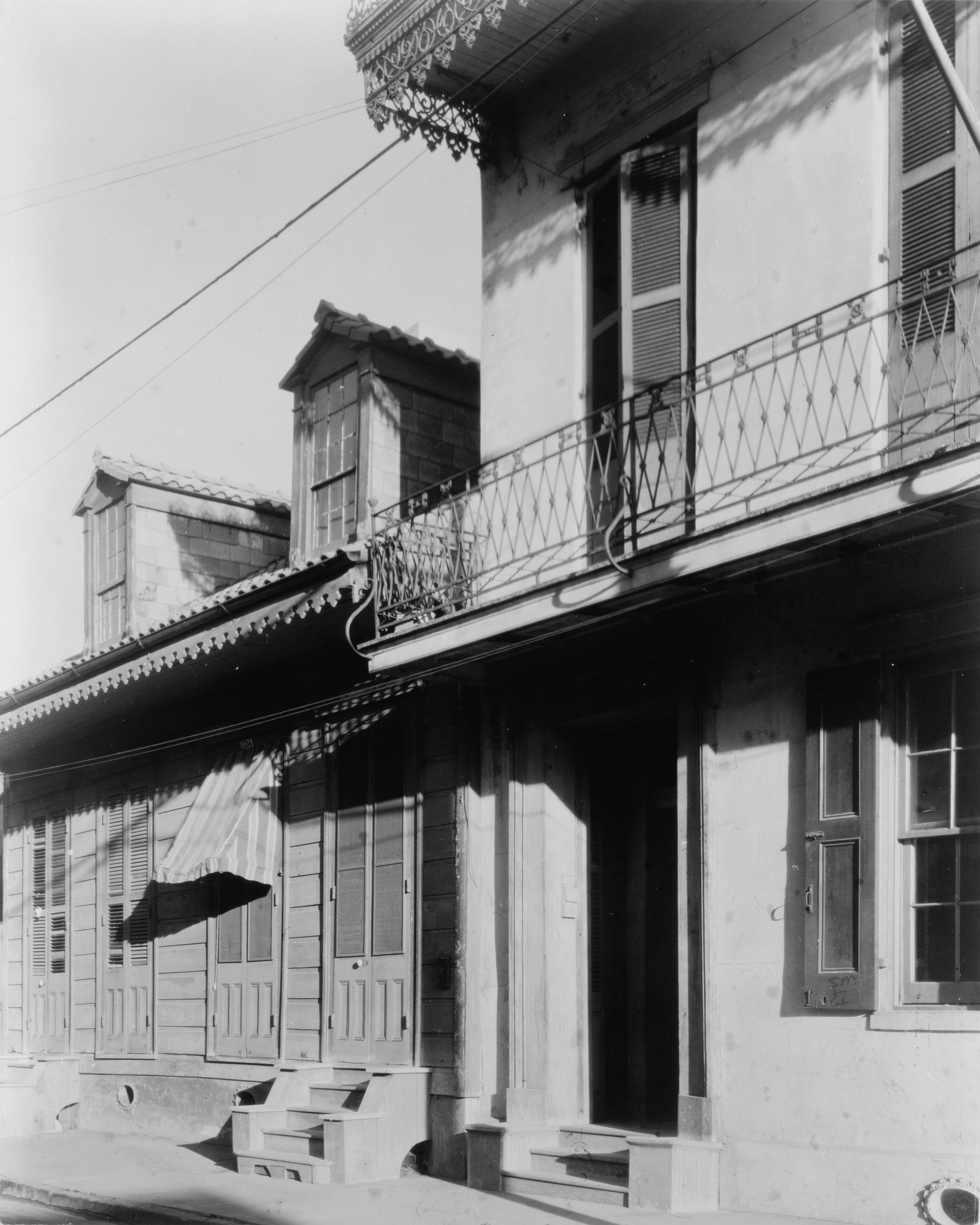
"Arcady, where all the leaves are merry": Frances Benjamin Johnston's house, 1132 Bourbon Street, New Orleans, Louisiana

As a result of this exhibit, the University of Virginia hired her to document its buildings, and the state of North Carolina commissioned her to record its architectural history. Louisiana hired Johnston to document its huge inventory of rapidly deteriorating plantations. She was given a grant in 1933 by the Carnegie Corporation of New York to document Virginia's early architecture. This led to a series of grants and photographs in eight other southern states; copies of all of her photographs from these projects were given to the Library of Congress for public use. In December 1935, Johnston began a year long project to capture historic structures of the Colonial Era in Virginia. This was intended to be a one-year project, but it developed into an eight-year extensive project. She traveled 50,000 miles and surveyed 95 counties in Virginia.

== Final years, death and legacy ==
Johnston was named an honorary member of the American Institute of Architects for her work in preserving old and endangered buildings. Her collections have been purchased by institutions such as the Metropolitan Museum of Art, the Virginia Museum of Fine Arts and the Baltimore Museum of Art. Although her relentless traveling was curtailed by gasoline rationing in the Second World War, the tireless Johnston continued to photograph. She bought a house in the French Quarter of New Orleans in 1940, and retired there in 1945. She died in New Orleans in 1952 at the age of eighty-eight.

== Gallery ==
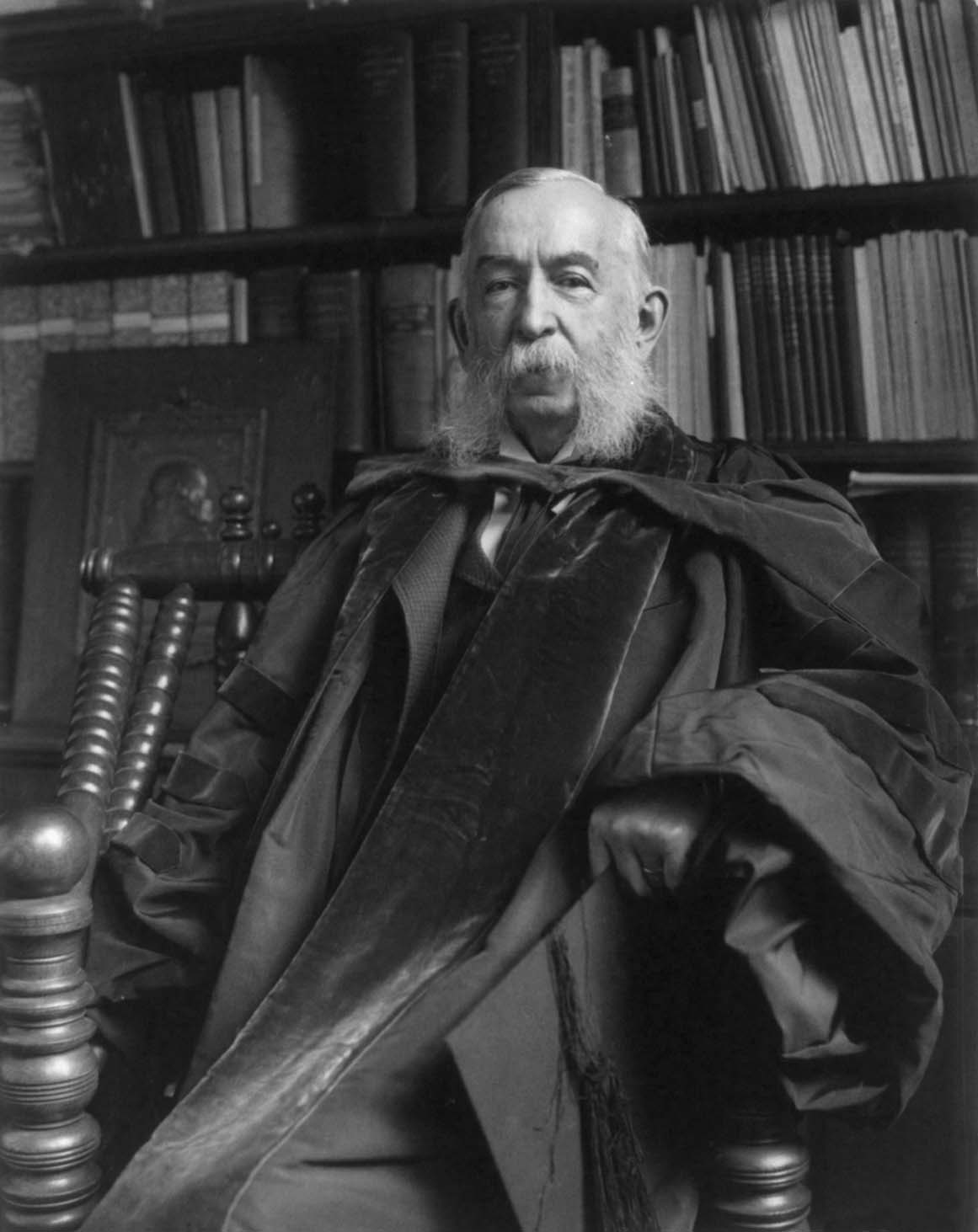
Three-quarter length portrait of educator Daniel Coit Gilman, ca. 1890

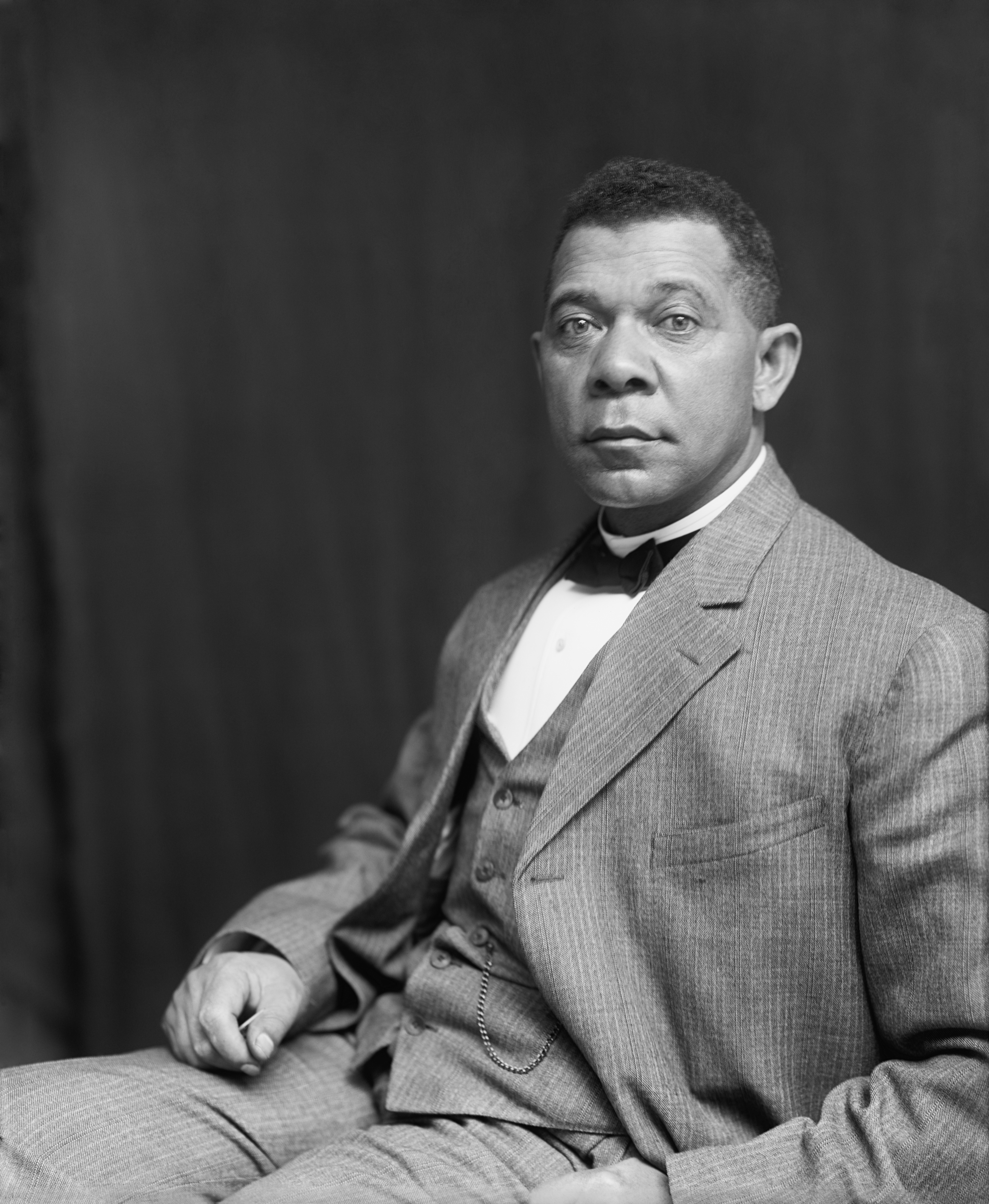
Booker T. Washington, c. 1895

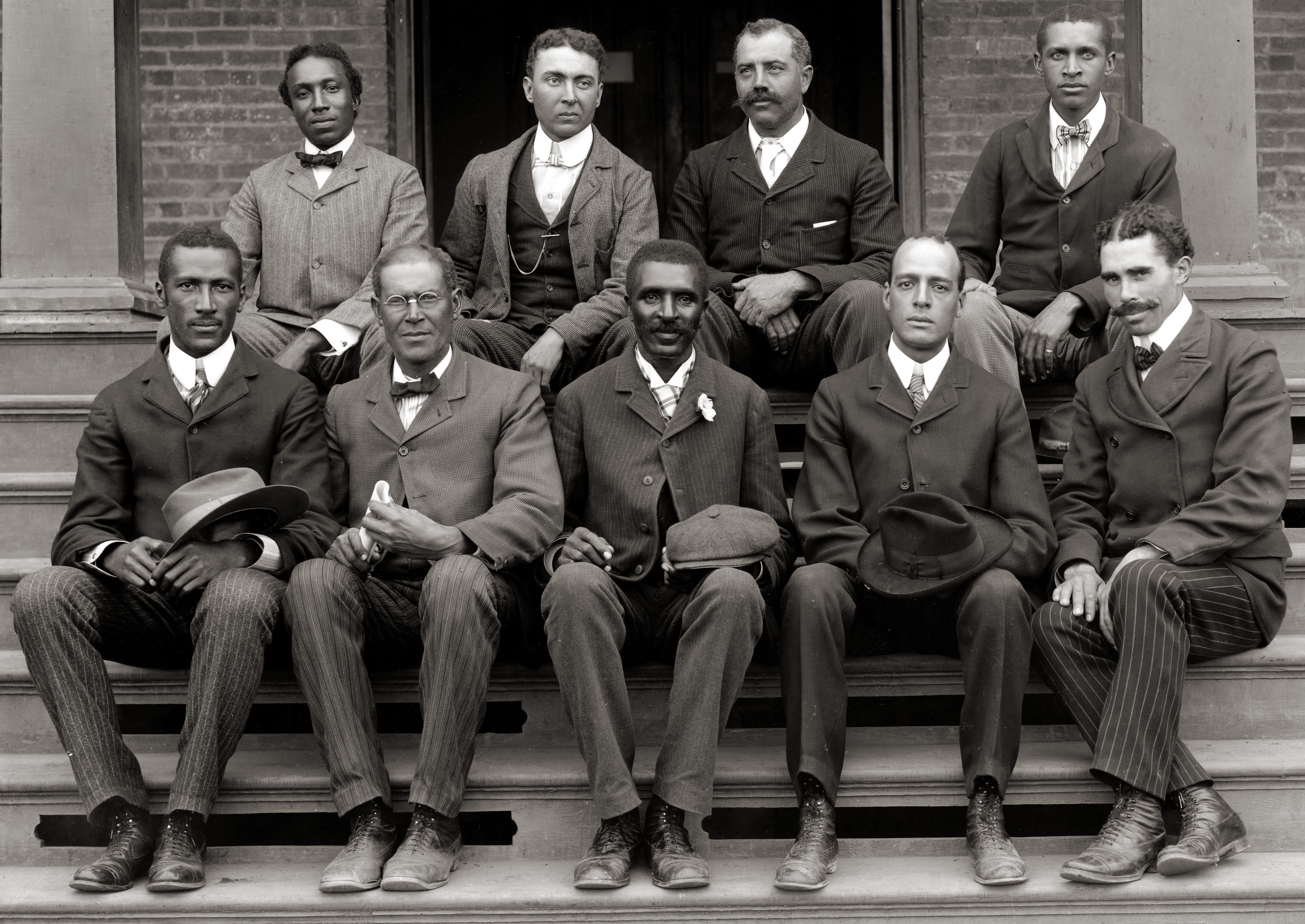
George Washington Carver (front row, center) poses with fellow faculty of Tuskegee Institute, c. 1902

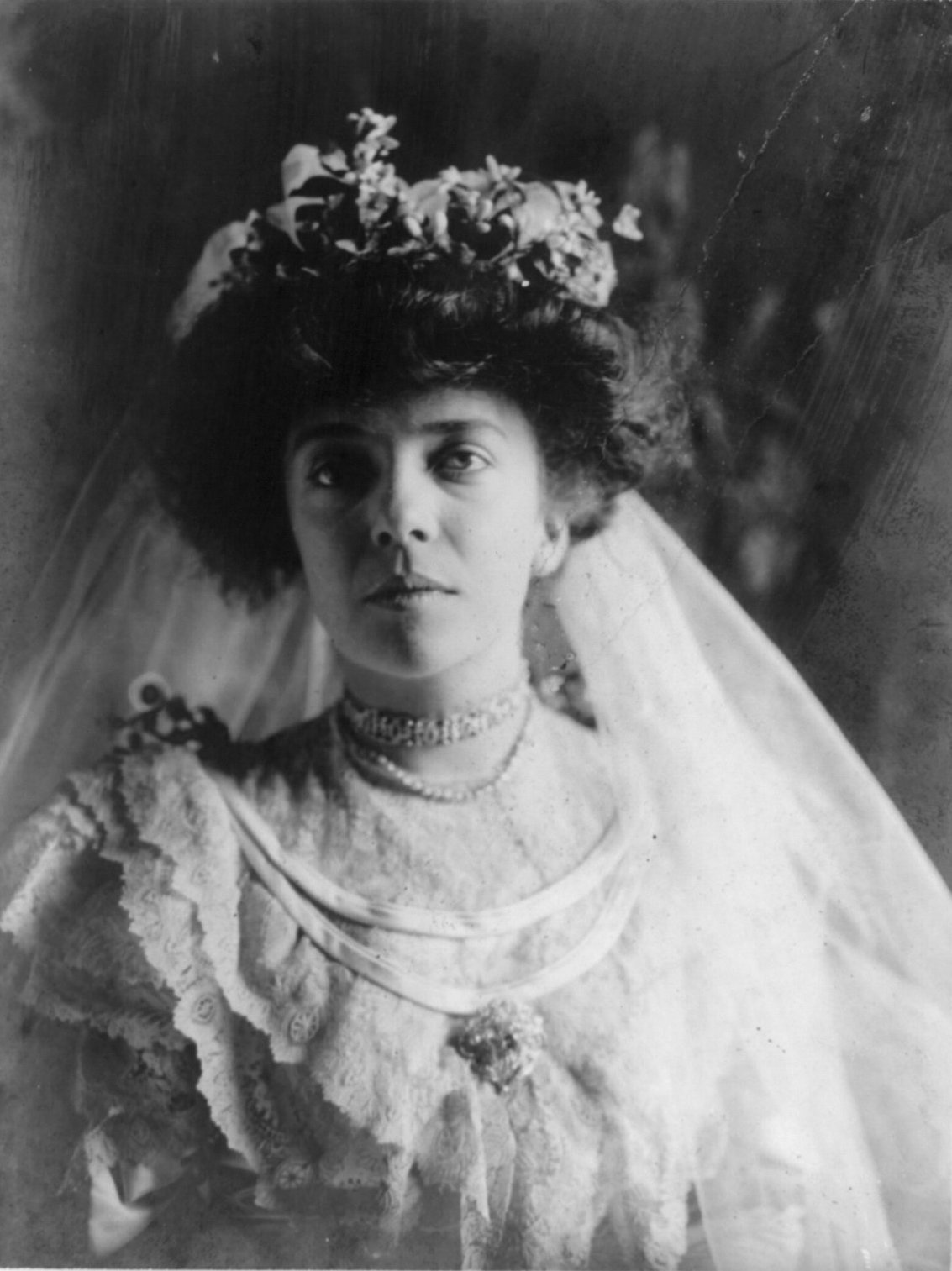
Alice Roosevelt's 1906 wedding photograph

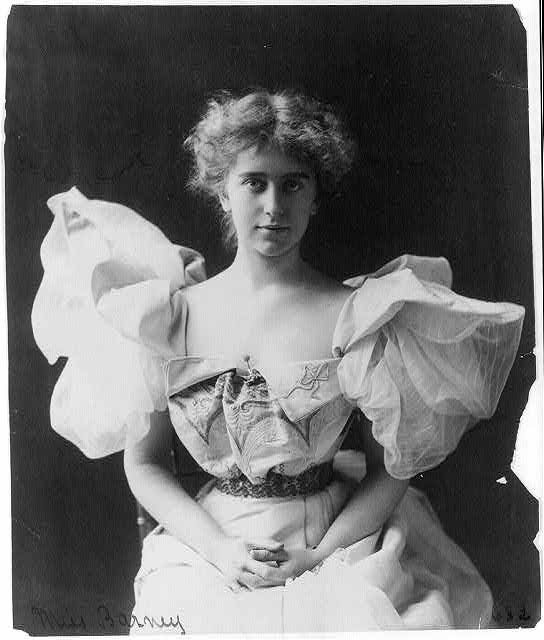
Natalie Clifford Barney, between ca. 1890 and ca. 1910

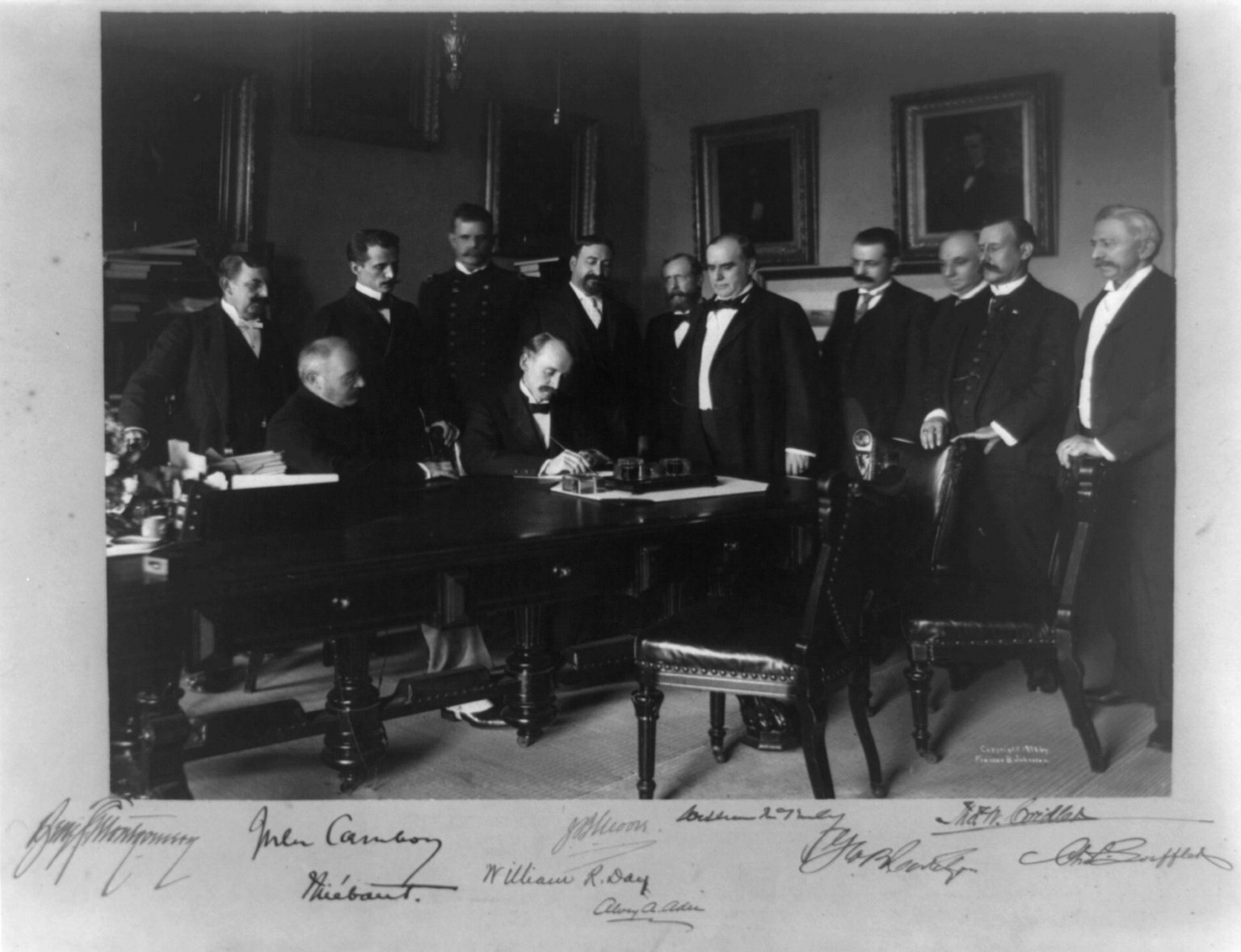
"Signing of the Protocol", marking the cessation of hostilities between the US and Spain in the Spanish–American War

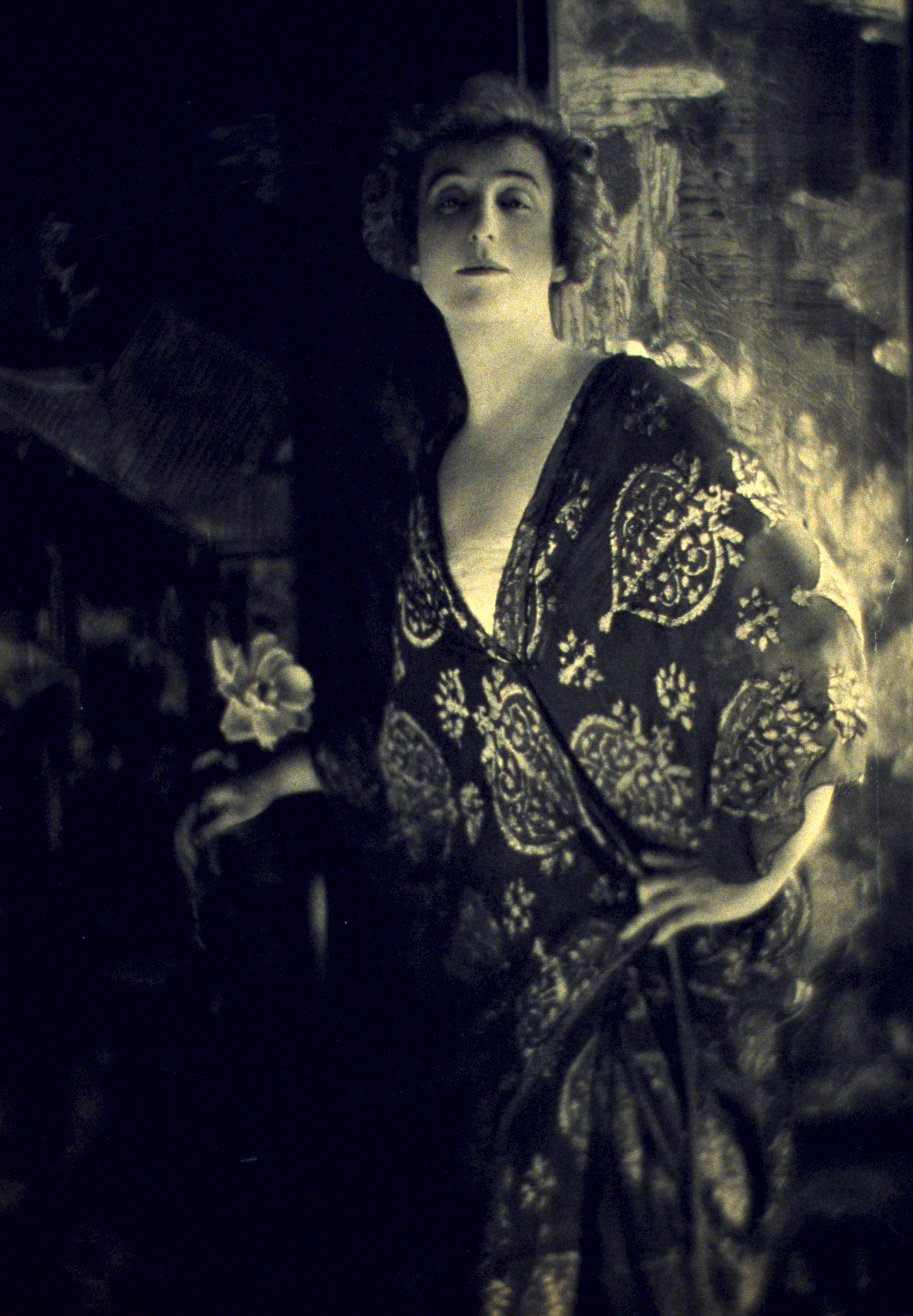
Ava Lowle Willing

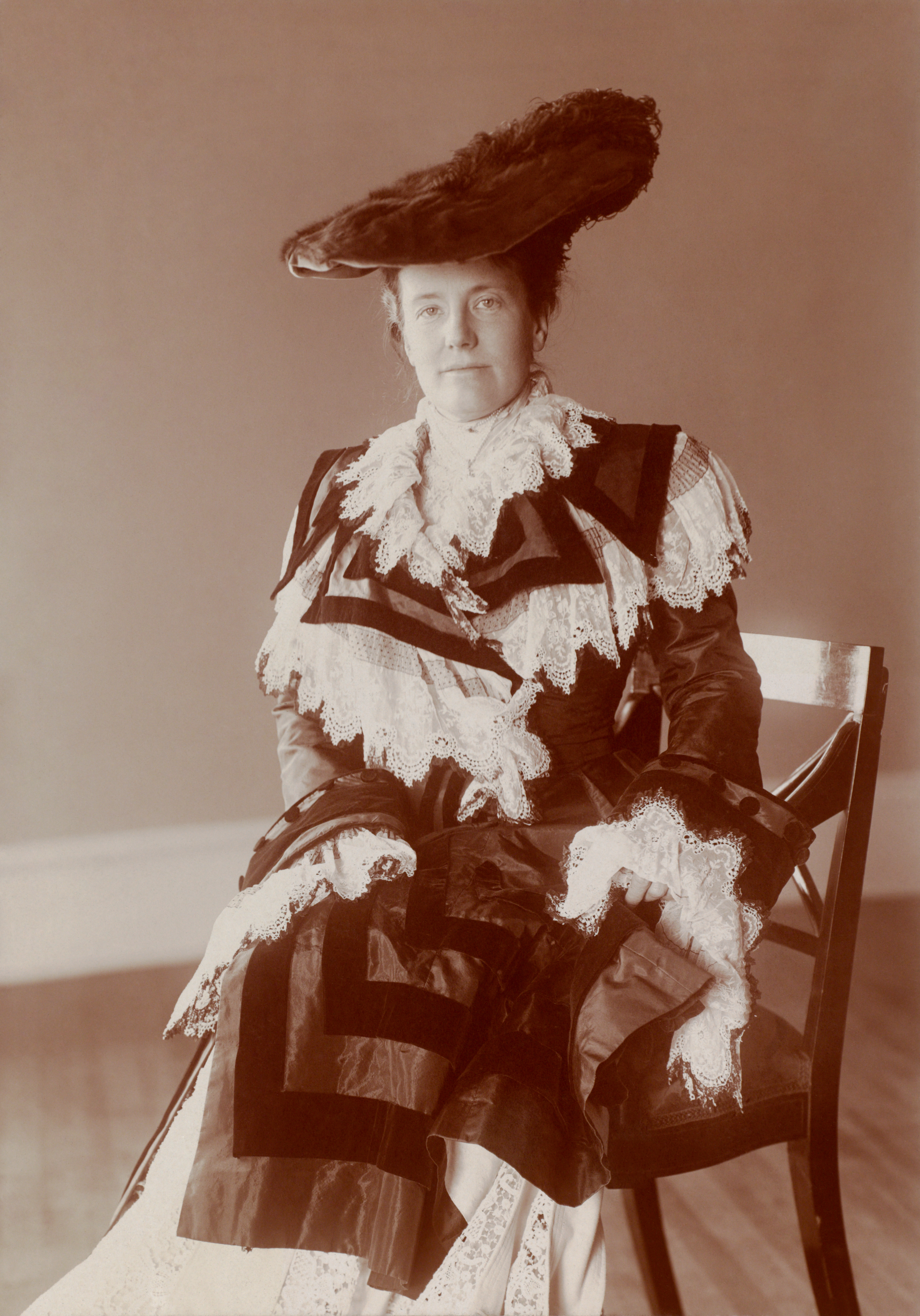
First Lady Edith Roosevelt
