= Mattie Edwards Hewitt =

American photographer

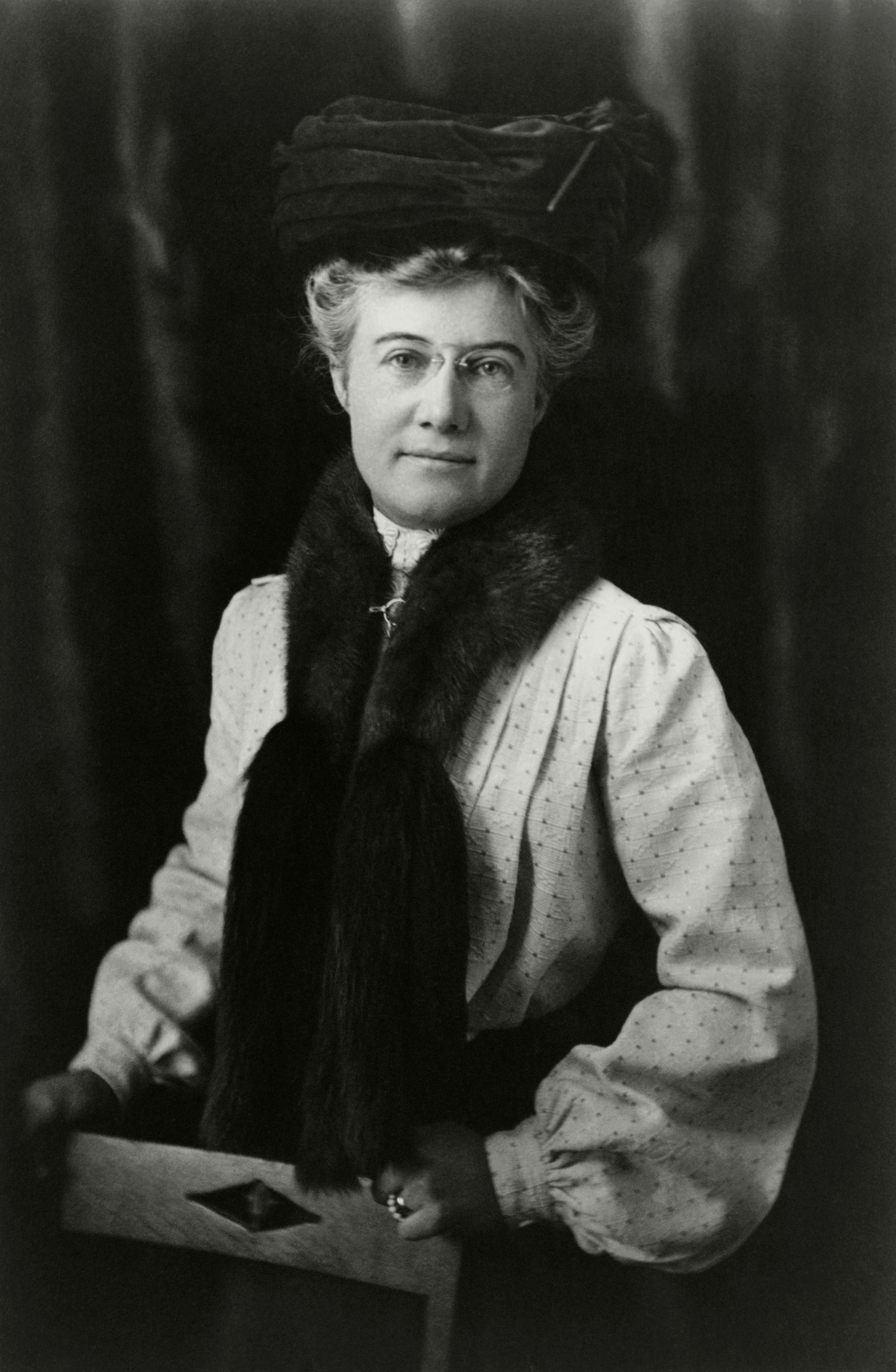
- Born: Mattie Edwards; October 1869; St. Louis, Missouri, U.S.
- Died: 1956 (aged 86–87); Boston, Massachusetts, U.S.
- Occupation: Photographer
- Years active: 1909–1956
- Known for: Location photography of architecture, landscape, and designs.

Mattie Edwards Hewitt (October 1869 – 1956) was an American photographer of architecture, landscape, and design, primarily based on the East Coast. Initially she was associated with Frances Benjamin Johnston, who later became her lover, living and working with her for eight years from 1909. Together they established the Johnston-Hewitt Studio in New York City, which functioned from 1913 till 1917. They became well known in the field of architectural and landscape photography and took many pictures of famous buildings and gardens, which were titled "Miss Johnston and Mrs. Hewitt" or "Frances Benjamin Johnston and Mattie Edwards Hewitt."

After the partnership with Johnston broke up in 1917, Hewitt began to work solo and became famous in her own right as a commercial photographer. She set up her business in photography with a specific focus on taking pictures for designers, architects, and landscape architects, recording interior and exterior views of home and business houses, and gardens. She continued in the profession until her death in Boston in 1956.

A catalog of Hewitt's work, titled "Portrait of an Era in Landscape Architecture: The Photographs of Mattie Edwards Hewitt", is available as an exhibit at the Wave Hill, Bronx, New York.

== Biography ==
Hewitt was born in October 1869 in St. Louis, Missouri, to a middle-class family. After a period of studying art she married Arthur Hewitt, a photographer. As his assistant, she was trained in principles of photography involving processing and printing. She started her career in photography as a small operation in St. Louis, where she lived and learned from the camera clubs and photography journals which were flourishing during the late 19th century. She was also influenced by an article on photography by Frances Benjamin Johnston, published in the Ladies Home Journal. Her photographs initially were of landscapes, her home surroundings including chickens in the barnyard, the cat and the dog.

During her visit to New York in 1901 to participate in the Pan-American Exposition held in Buffalo, New York, Hewitt met Johnston, who was then a famous photographer from Washington D.C. Johnston made a profound influence not only on Hewitt's photographic career but also on her personal life for several years. She then became a fan of Johnston and started writing letters to her seeking her help professionally and personally. Hewitt sought her advice on several matters including providing a job opportunity for her husband with Lumière, the French photographers and scientists, in his newly opened East Coast office in New York. She sought Johnston's advice for creating a dark room in her house, which however was built by her husband; this dark room made with walls fixed with terracotta building paper had enough shelves and space for two people to work freely. From this dark room of her husband's studio she printed photographs taken by Johnston.

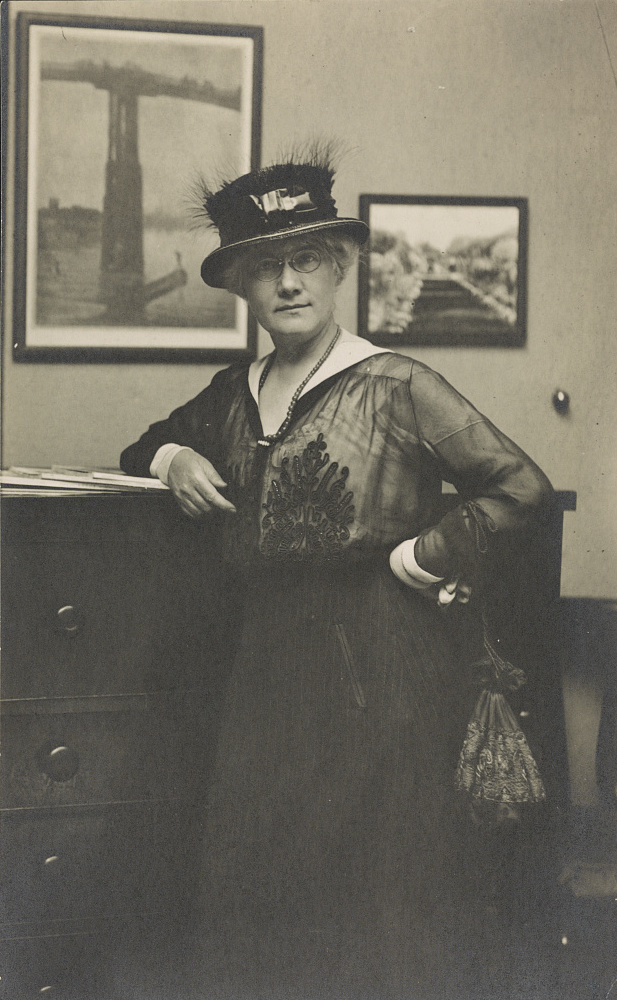
Photo shows Mattie Edwards Hewitt, three-quarter length portrait, standing, facing front, right arm on chest of drawers.

Hewitt's correspondence with Johnston, which was mostly one sided, was quite sensuous with declaration of her love for Johnston. Some of her letters to Johnston are part of the book titled "The Woman behind the Lens: The Life and Work of Frances Benjamin Johnston" (1864–1952) by Bettina Berch which also contain "epistolary exchanges of lady-love" letters of the then many other famous women such as between Virginia Woolf and Vita Sackville-West, Eleanor Roosevelt and Lorena Hickok, Edna St. Vincent Millay and Edith Wynne Matthison, and Margaret Mead and Ruth Benedict. One of Hewitt's letters to Johnston said "I wonder why I expect you to understand me better than most people – is it because I love you so?" Based on these letters the author of the biography, asserts that the exchanges were "unswervingly lesbian... hardly straight forward". However, some scholars opine that such romantic exchange of letters was not unusual among the woman of the 19th century and consider them as not sensual. But many others feel that such writings are a "clue to a greater, if submerged, lesbian subculture".

Hewitt then divorced her husband, Arthur Hewitt, in 1909, and moved to New York to work and live with Johnston. After her divorce, she was dependent on photography as a profession for her living and pursued it with dedication, and had said "it is the most fascinating of arts". Her photographic career was a "transition from an amateur in the 19th century to 20th century professional", when there was substantial innovation in photographic equipment.

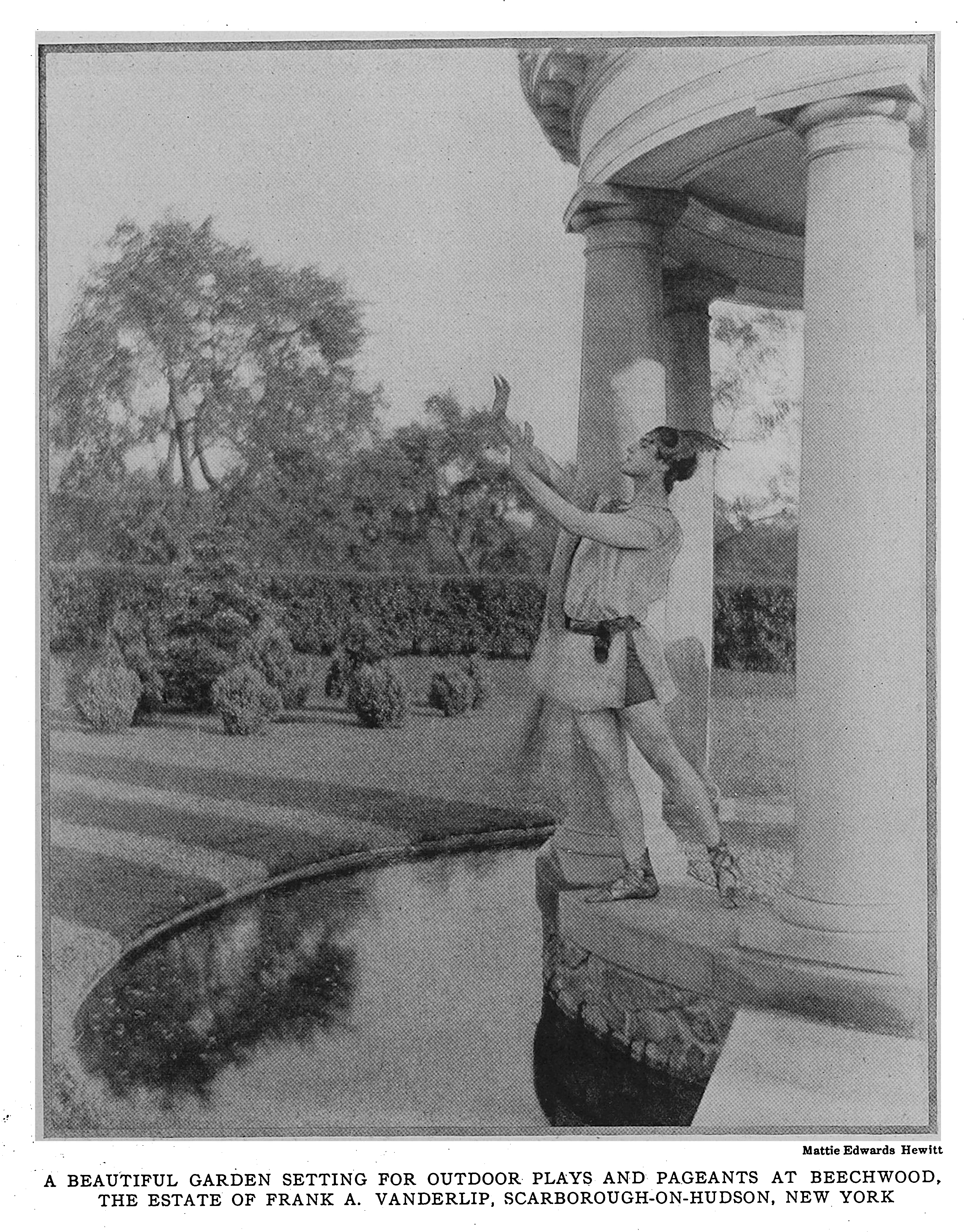
Photograph taken by Hewitt at the Beechwood mansion

Though she shifted to New York in 1909, it was only in 1913 that she established a photography firm, in partnership with Johnston, titled the "Johnston-Hewitt Studio" in New York, with a specialty in architectural and garden photography. While Johnston held the primary task of shooting for the studio, Hewitt functioned in the studio as the darkroom assistant. She was at this stage dependent on Johnston as her mentor. However, their partnership broke up in 1917, for reasons unknown. Hewitt developed her own professional skill in home and garden photography, and operated independently. By this time, she had a good clientele to pursue business on her own. With her office in New York City, she became a freelance photographer and executed many assignments by taking pictures of mansions and gardens of rich people of the East Coast. Her nephew Richard Averill Smith had also associated with her on some of the assignments. Many of these pictures were published in newspapers and magazines, along with articles on the mansions in the New York Times, the Evening Post, House Beautiful, and House & Garden, and Garden Magazine.

In 1910, Hewitt had taken photographs of the Albert Boardman Estate in Southampton which was published in Southampton Times in 1912 and again in 1916 which brought her professional skill to limelight. In all the photographs she took, carrying heavy wooden cameras and wooden tripods, for clients she also took additional pictures which she offered to newspapers and magazines for publication as part of an article. She also maintained a good record of negatives with names of clients, architects, and location. She had also taken photographs for buildings of Carrère & Hastings who had recommended her work to others. In the words of Robin S. Karson, author of the book titled Fletcher Steele, Landscape Architect: An Account of the Gardenmaker's Life, 1885–1971, Hewitt was "one of the best known and most lyrical garden photographers of her day." Hewitt took photographs documenting the estate for the Paris Exhibition of 1930. These photographs have been said to "glimmer with drops of light reflecting from shiny-leaved willows".

== Bibliography ==
- Fleming, Nancy (March 1, 2013). Money, Manure & Maintenance. Nancy Fleming. ISBN 978-0-9643003-9-2.
- Gover, C. Jane (1988). The Positive Image: Women Photographers in Turn-of-the-Century America. SUNY Press. ISBN 978-0-88706-533-0.
- Karson, Robin S. (May 1989). Fletcher Steele, landscape architect: an account of the gardenmaker's life, 1885–1971. Abrams/Sagapress. ISBN 978-0-8109-1523-7.
- Lemon, Brendan (August 2000). "BOOKS: Frances Benjamin Johnston: A brilliantly seductive new biography asks: was one of America's greatest photographers a lesbian?". Out (magazine). Here Publishing.
- Rybczynski, Witold; Olin, Laurie; Brooke, Steven (2007). Vizcaya: An American Villa and Its Makers. University of Pennsylvania Press. ISBN 978-0-8122-3951-5.
