= Elizabeth Johnson =

Elizabeth Johnson may refer to:

- Elizabeth Johnson Jr. (1671–1747), convicted during the Salem witch trials
- Elizabeth Johnson (died 1752) (1689–1752), wife of writer Samuel Johnson
- Elizabeth Johnson (actress) (1771–1830), English stage actress
- Elizabeth Johnson (pamphleteer) (1721–1800), longitude projector
- Eliza McCardle Johnson (1810–1876), wife of US president Andrew Johnson
- Elizabeth Johnson (advocate) (1849–1924), advocate of Kansas history
- Elizabeth Johnson (theologian) (born 1941), Christian feminist theologian
- Elizabeth Friench Johnson (1890–1979), American college professor
- E. Elizabeth Johnson, Presbyterian biblical scholar
- Betty Johnson (1929–2022), American traditional pop and cabaret singer
- Betsey Johnson (born 1942), American fashion designer
- Betty Johnson (physicist) (1936–2003), American theoretical physicist
- Betsy Johnson (born 1951), American politician in Oregon
- Liz Johnson (bowler) (born 1974), American professional bowler
- Liz Johnson (swimmer) (born 1985), British Paralympic gold medalist
- Elizabeth Johnson, character from American Horror Story: Hotel
- Beth Johnson (Florida politician) (1909–1973), member of the Florida House of Representatives and the Florida Senate
- Lizzie Johnson, American journalist and author

== See also ==
- Elizabeth Johnston (disambiguation)
- Beth Johnson (Canadian politician), mayor of Delta, British Columbia, Canada
