= Elizabeth Bryant Johnston =

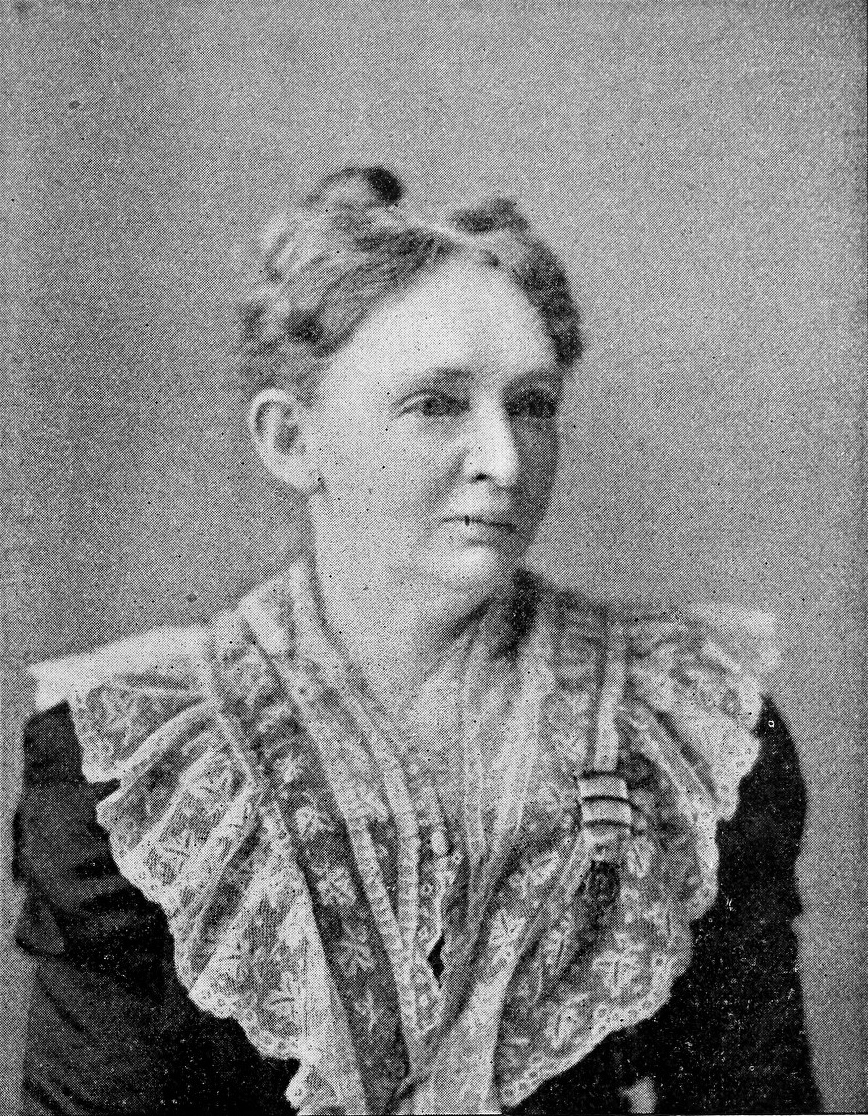
Photograph of Elizabeth Bryant Johnston taken by her niece, Frances Benjamin Johnston

Elizabeth Bryant Johnston (July 12, 1833 in Mason County, Kentucky,– January 13, 1907) was an American historian and author of several books on George Washington and his residence at Mount Vernon, including numerous editions of the Visitors' Guide to Mount Vernon.

Johnston was also a founding member of the Historical Society of Washington, D.C., Historian General of the Daughters of the American Revolution, and Associate Editor of American Monthly Magazine.

== Life ==
Johnston was born on July 12, 1833. During the 1870s, she lived with her brother, lawyer Sanders W. Johnston, and his wife, Sarah Johnston, at their home on Florida Avenue in Washington, D.C. Another brother of Johnston's, Anderson Daniphan Johnston, worked as head bookkeeper in the United States Department of the Treasury; his daughter was photographer Frances Benjamin Johnston.

Johnston wrote the first edition of the Visitors Guide to Mount Vernon in 1876 while staying at Mount Vernon, with the permission of the Mount Vernon Ladies' Association (MVLA). She published the book in 1877 and entered into a contract with the MVLA shortly thereafter. Johnston continued to write updated editions of the guidebook for over twenty years, until her partnership with the MVLA ended in 1898.

Johnston was a contributor to the volume Our Famous Women: An Authorized Record of the Lives and Deeds of Distinguished American Women of Our Times (1884). Other contributors included Elizabeth Stuart Phelps, Harriet Beecher Stowe, Susan Coolidge, and Elizabeth Cady Stanton, among others.

Johnston died on January 13, 1907. After her death, the members of the Historical Society of Washington, D.C. paid tribute to her life, writing, "Her labors in journalism, her faculty for art criticism, her interest in history and advancement of Washington City, her researches in genealogy, with her eminently social qualities, were noteworthy elements in the record of a long and useful life."

== Bibliography ==
- Christmas in Kentucky (1862)
- A Visit to the Cabinet of the United States Mint (1876)
- Visitors' Guide to Mount Vernon (1877)
- George Washington Day by Day (1895)
