= Robert Redfield (disambiguation) =

Robert Redfield (1897–1958) was an American anthropologist.

Robert Redfield also refers to:

- Robert S. Redfield (1849–1923), American pictorialist photographer
- Robert R. Redfield (born 1951), American virologist, former director of the Centers for Disease Control and Prevention
