= The Hand of Man =

Photograph by Alfred Stieglitz

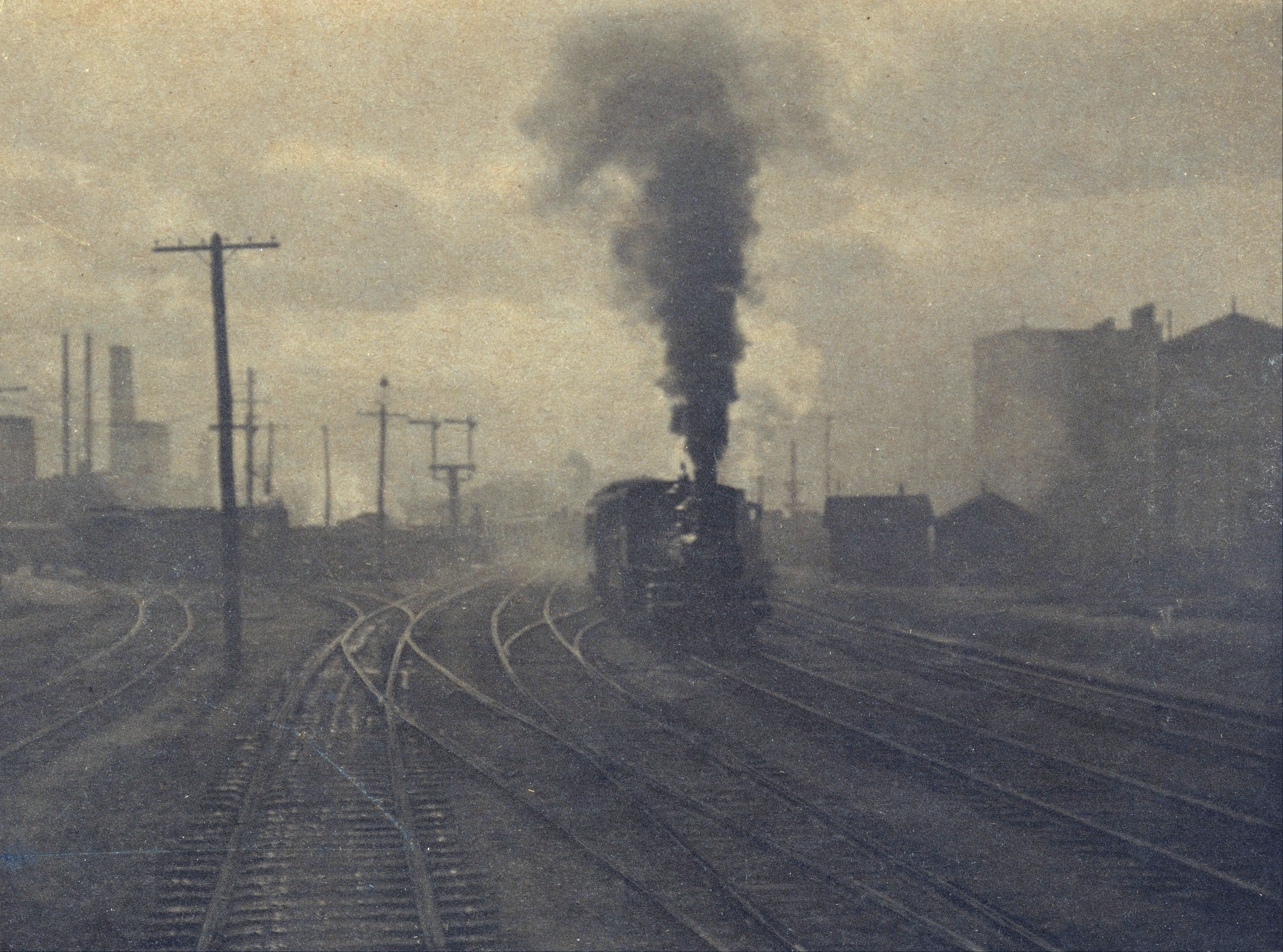
The Hand of Man (1902) by Alfred Stieglitz

The Hand of Man is a black and white photograph taken by Alfred Stieglitz in 1902. This is one of the pictures he took concerning urban life and would be published in the first issue of his magazine Camera Work, in January 1903. A note on this issue stated that “The Hand of Man.. is an attempt to treat pictorially a subject which enters so much into our daily lives that we are apt to lose sight of the pictorial possibilities of the commonplace.”

== History and description ==
This photograph was taken from the back of a train in motion in Long Island, New York. It depicts a locomotive in the train yards of Long Island, unleashing a black cloud of smoke, while it moves through a criss-crossing ground of tracks. To the left several telephone poles seems also to extend toward the horizon, while at the right are visible several buildings.

The title alludes to the action of man seen in the urban landscape of the picture and possibly also to photography itself as an artistic mean.

== Public collections ==
There are prints of this photograph in several public collections, including the Metropolitan Museum of Art, New York, the Museum of Modern Art, New York, the George Eastman House, Rochester, the Museum of Fine Arts, Boston, the Philadelphia Museum of Art, Library of Congress, Washington, D.C., The Art Institute of Chicago, the J. Paul Getty Museum, Los Angeles, the San Francisco Museum of Modern Art, and the National Museum of Modern Art, Tokyo.
