= Photo-Secession =

Group of photographers and art movement

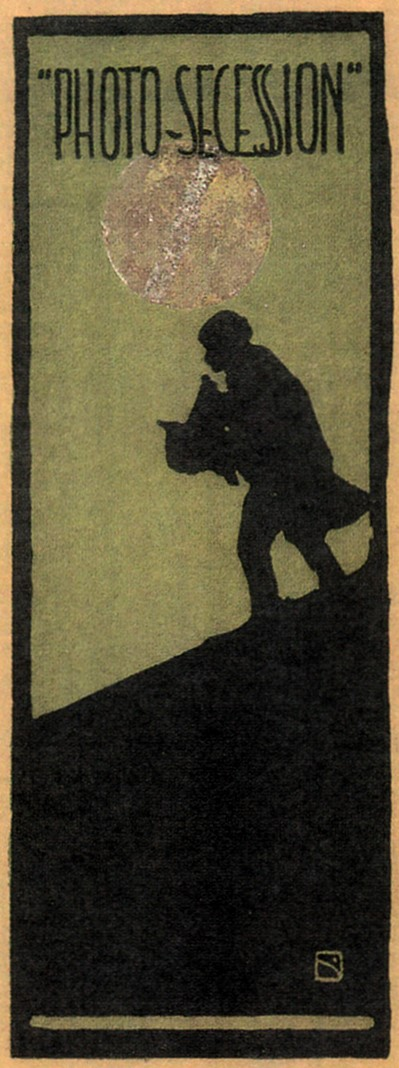
Advertisement for the Photo-Secession and the Little Galleries of the Photo-Secession, designed by Edward Steichen. Published in Camera Work no. 13, 1906

The Photo-Secession was an early 20th century movement that promoted photography as a fine art in general and photographic pictorialism in particular.

A group of photographers, led by Alfred Stieglitz and F. Holland Day in the early 20th century, held the then controversial viewpoint that what was significant about a photograph was not what was in front of the camera but the manipulation of the image by the artist/photographer to achieve their subjective vision. The movement helped to raise standards and awareness of art photography.

The group is the American counterpart to the Linked Ring, an invitation-only British group which seceded from the Royal Photographic Society.

== Context and history ==
The group was formed in 1902 after Stieglitz was asked by the National Arts Club to put together an exhibition of the best in contemporary American photography. While organizing the show, Stieglitz had a disagreement with some of the more conservative members of the Club about which photographers should be included. To strengthen his position, Stieglitz rapidly formed an invitation-only group, which he called the Photo-Secession, to give the impression that his views were backed by many other prominent photographers. Although he later claimed that he had "enlisted the aid of the then newly organized and limited 'Photo-Secession'," in fact there was no such group until he formed it on February 17, 1902, just two weeks before the show at the National Arts Club was scheduled to open.

In naming the group, Stieglitz is thought to have been influenced by the 1898 Munich Secession Exhibition (Verlag des Vereines Bildender Künstler Münchens "Sezession"). Stieglitz corresponded frequently with Fritz Matthies-Masuren, who wrote an essay in the catalog for the Munich exhibition, and he was captivated by the thought of photographers defining their own art form. In 1899 he wrote:

In Munich, the art-centre of Germany, the 'Secessionists', a body of artists comprising the most advanced and gifted men of their times, who (as the name indicates have broken away from the narrow rules of custom and tradition) have admitted the claims of the pictorial photograph to be judged on its merits as a work of art independently, and without considering the fact that it has been produced through the medium of the camera.

Later in his life, Stieglitz gave this account about the origins of the Photo-Secession:

National Arts Club Director Charles DeKay: "What shall we call this [exhibition]?"
Stieglitz: "Call it An Exhibition of American Photography arranged by the Photo-Secession".
DeKay: "What's that? Who is it?"
Stieglitz: "Yours truly, for the present, and there'll be others when the show opens. The idea of Secession is hateful to Americans - they'll be thinking of the Civil War. I'm not. Photo-Secession actually means a seceding from the accepted idea of what constitutes a photograph."

Cultural historian Jay Bochner points out that it is important to look at the Photo-Secession for more than visual aesthetics:

What, then, was this secession from? It was not only from artwork that had gone stale through the copying of Victorian, conventional styles, but more importantly from the dictatorship of the entrenched institutions, galleries, art schools and professional art organizations that enforced or at very least sanctioned copying or imitation.

Proponents of Pictorialism, which was the underlying value of the Photo-Secession, argued that photography needed to emulate the painting and etching of the time. Pictorialists believed that, just as a painting is distinctive because of the artist's manipulation of the materials to achieve an effect, so too should the photographer alter or manipulate the photographic image. Among the methods used were soft focus; special filters and lens coatings; burning, dodging and/or cropping in the darkroom to edit the content of the image; and alternative printing processes such as sepia toning, carbon printing, platinum printing or gum bichromate processing.

Content of the images often referred to previous work done by other artists, especially Greek and Roman art. Images often contained stylistic consistency such as dramatic lighting, perspective, geometry, use of monochrome/black and white, and high contrast.

In founding the Photo-Secession, Stieglitz asserted that it was a "rebellion against the insincere attitude of the unbeliever, of the Philistine, and largely exhibition authorities." While this was in part true, his actions demonstrated that the creation of the Photo-Secession was also about advancing his own position in the world of photography and art.

Stieglitz's sole role in forming and tightly controlling the Photo-Secession was made clear by two exchanges that took place at the opening of the National Arts Club show. In the first, Stieglitz implied that membership in the group was relatively open:

Gertrude Käsebier: "What's this Photo-Secession? Am I a photo-secessionist?"
Stieglitz: "Do you feel that you are?"
Käsebier: "I do."
Stieglitz: "Well, that's all there is to it."

However, when Charles Berg asked Stieglitz if he, too, was a Photo-Secessionist, Stieglitz brusquely informed him that he was not. Stieglitz gave this response even though he was the one responsible for including three of Berg's photos in the show.

The "membership" of the Photo-Secession varied according to Stieglitz's interests and temperament but was centered on the core group of Stieglitz, Edward Steichen, Clarence H. White, Käsebier, Frank Eugene, and later Alvin Langdon Coburn.

The photographers included in the first exhibition were C. Yarnell Abbott, Prescott Adamson, Arthur E. Becher, Charles I. Berg, Alice Boughton, John G. Bullock, Rose Clark and Elizabeth Flint Wade, F. Colburn Clarke, F. Holland Day, Mary M. Devens, William B. Dyer, Thomas M. Edmiston, Frank Eugene, Dallett Fuguet, Tom Harris, Gertrude Käsebier, Joseph T. Keily, Mary Morgan Keipp, Oscar Maurer, William B. Post, Robert S. Redfield, W. W. Renwick, Eva Watson-Schütze, T. O'Conor Sloane, Jr., Ema Spencer, Edward Steichen, Alfred Stieglitz, Edmund Stirling, Henry Troth, Mathilde Weil and Clarence H. White.

In 1905 Stieglitz established with Steichen the Little Galleries of the Photo-Secession, a small but highly influential gallery where he continued to exhibit some of the more well-known members of the movement. The group continued to exhibit under the Photo-Secession name until about 1910, when several photographers finally grew tired of Stieglitz's autocratic ways and left the group.

In 1916 Käsebier, White, Coburn and others formed an organization called the Pictorial Photographers of America(PPA) to continue promotion of the pictorial style. A year later Stieglitz formally dissolved the Photo-Secession, although by that time it existed in name only.

== Stieglitz's statement ==
The following notice appeared in Camera Work, no. 3, Supplement, July 1903

The Photo-Secession

"So many are the enquiries as to the nature and aims of the Photo- Secession and requirements of eligibility to membership therein, that we deem it expedient to give a brief résumé of the character of this body of photographers.

The object of the Photo-Secession is: to advance photography as applied to pictorial expression; to draw together those Americans practicing or otherwise interested in the art, and to hold from time to time, at varying places, exhibitions not necessarily limited to the productions of the Photo-Secession or to American work.

It consists of a Council (all of whom are Fellows); Fellows chosen by the Council for meritorious photographic work or labors in behalf of pictorial photography, and Associates eligible by reason of interest in, and sympathy with, the aims of the Secession.

In order to give Fellowship the value of an honor, the photographic work of a possible candidate must be individual and distinctive, and it goes without saying that the applicant must be in thorough sympathy with our aims and principles.

To Associateship are attached no requirements except sincere sympathy with the aims and motives of the Secession. Yet, it must not be supposed that these qualifications will be assumed as a matter of course, as it has been found necessary to deny the application of many whose lukewarm interest in the cause with which we are so thoroughly identified gave no promise of aiding the Secession. It may be of general interest to know that quite a few, perhaps entitled by their photographic work to Fellowship, have applied in vain. Their rejection being based solely upon their avowed or notoriously active opposition or equally harmful apathy. Many whose sincerity could not be questioned were refused Fellowship because the work submitted was not equal to the required standard. Those desiring further information must address the Director of the Photo-Secession, Mr. Alfred Stieglitz, 1111 Madison Avenue, New York."

== List of members ==
List of Members of the Photo-Secession, found in Camera Work, no. 3, Supplement, July 1903

Fellows (Founders and Council)

- John G. Bullock – Philadelphia
- William. B Dyer. – Chicago
- Dallett Fuguet – New York
- Gertrude Käsebier – New York
- Joseph T. Keiley – New York
- Robert S. Redfield – Philadelphia
- Eva Watson-Schütze – Chicago
- Edward J. Steichen – New York
- Alfred Stieglitz – New York
- Edmund Stirling – Philadelphia
- John F. Strauss – New York
- Clarence H. White – Newark, Ohio

The following were also listed Fellows, but not members of the Council

- Alvin Langdon Coburn – Boston
- Mary Devens – Boston
- William B. Post – Fryeburg, Me.
- S. L. Willard – Chicago

Associates

- Prescott Adamson – Philadelphia
- W. P. Agnew – New York
- A. C. Bates – Cleveland, Ohio
- Edward LaVelle Bourke – Chicago
- Annie W. Brigman – Oakland, Cal.
- Norman W. Carkhuff – Washington
- W. E. Carlin – New York
- J. Mitchell Elliot – Philadelphia
- Dr. Milton Franklin – New York
- George A. Heisey – Newark, Oh.
- Sam S. Holzman – New York
- Marshall P. Kernochan – New York
- Sarah H. Ladd – Portland, Ore.
- Chester Abbott Lawrence – New York
- Fred K. Lawrence – Chicago
- Oscar Maurer – San Francisco
- William J. Mullins – Franklin, Pa.
- Olive M. Potts – Philadelphia
- Harry B. Reid – New York
- Harry C. Rubincam – Denver
- T. O'Conor Sloane – Orange, N. J.
- Walter P. Stokes – Philadelphia
- Mrs. George A. Stanbery – Zanesville, Ohio
- Katherine Stanbery – Zanesville, Ohio
- George B. Vaux – Philadelphia
- Mary Vaux – Philadelphia
- Lily E. White – Portland, Ore.
- Myra Wiggins – Salem, Ore.
- Arthur W. Wilde – Philadelphia

Later the following photographers were listed as Members of the Photo-Secession. Unlike Fellows and Associates, no definition was given of what constituted a member. All categories and assignments of membership were made by Stieglitz himself.

- Charlotte C. Albright – Buffalo, N. Y.
- J. W. Alexander – New York
- John Aspinwall – Newburgh, N.Y.
- Alice Boughton – New York
- A. K. Boursault – New York
- John M. Bowles – New York
- F. E. Brown – Grand Rapids, Mich.
- Francis Bruguière – San Francisco
- Elizabeth Buehrmann – Chicago
- Charles H. Caffin – New York
- S. R. Carter -Toronto, Canada
- Mrs. F. F. Coburn – New York
- C. C. Crowther – Kobe, Japan
- S. D. Dixon – New York
- J. M. Drivet – New York
- Charles B. Duryea – New York
- Hiram Duryea – New York
- W. G. Eckstein – New York
- Frank Eugene – New York
- Herbert G. French – Cincinnati
- George Haviland – New York
- Paul Haviland – New York
- L. A. Heinsheimer – New York
- H. A. Hess – Springfield, Ill.
- J. P. Hodgins – Toronto, Canada
- L. J. R. Holst – New York
- S. S. Hornor – Concordville, Pa.
- F. W. Hunter – New York
- W. F. James – Chicago
- Frances B. Johnston – Washington
- Walter G. Jones – New York
- Edward W. Keck – Rochester, N. Y.
- Spencer, Jr. Kellogg – Buffalo, N. Y.
- J. B. Kerfoot – New York
- R. Kimbell – New York
- Louis A. Lamb – Chicago
- H. W. Lance – New York
- J. N. Laurvik – New York
- S. Brainerd Lawrence – New York
- Adelaide C.[sic] Leeson – Douglas, Alaska
- A. A. Lewis – New York
- Helen. Lohman – New York
- C. H. Macdowell – Chicago
- F. F. Marks – Camden, N. J.
- L. M. McCormick – Asheville, N. C.
- Arthur. Mooney – New York
- Charles Peabody – Cambridge, Massachusetts
- Jeanette B. Peabody – Cambridge, Massachusetts
- F. H. Pratt – Worcester, Mass.
- Landon Rives – Cobham, Va.
- C. W. Roepper – Philadelphia
- L. B. Schram – New York
- Sarah C. Sears – Boston
- George Seeley – Stockbridge, Mass.
- H. S. Smith – Boston
- L. F. Stephany – Pittsburgh
- Albert E. Sterner – New York
- Karl Struss – New York
- Elizabeth R. Tyson – Boston
- S. S. Webber – Trenton, N. J.
- W. E. Wilmerding – New York
