= Mary Devens =

American photographer (1857–1920)

Mary Devens (17 May 1857 – 13 March 1920) was an American photographer who was considered one of the ten most prominent pictorial photographers of the early 20th century. She was listed as a founding member of Alfred Stieglitz’s famed Photo-Secession.

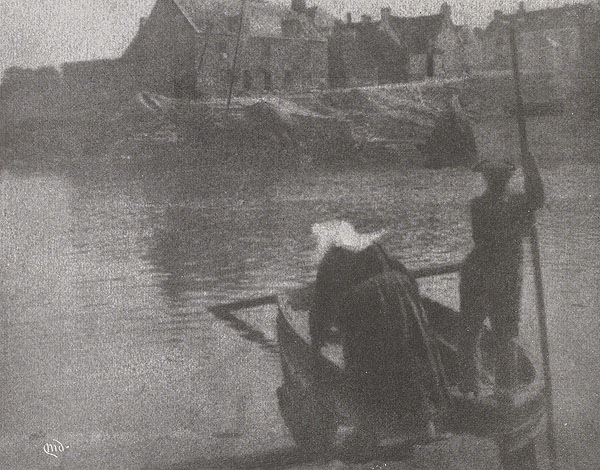
"The Ferry, Concarneau", by Mary Devens. Photogravure published in Camera Work, No 7, 1904

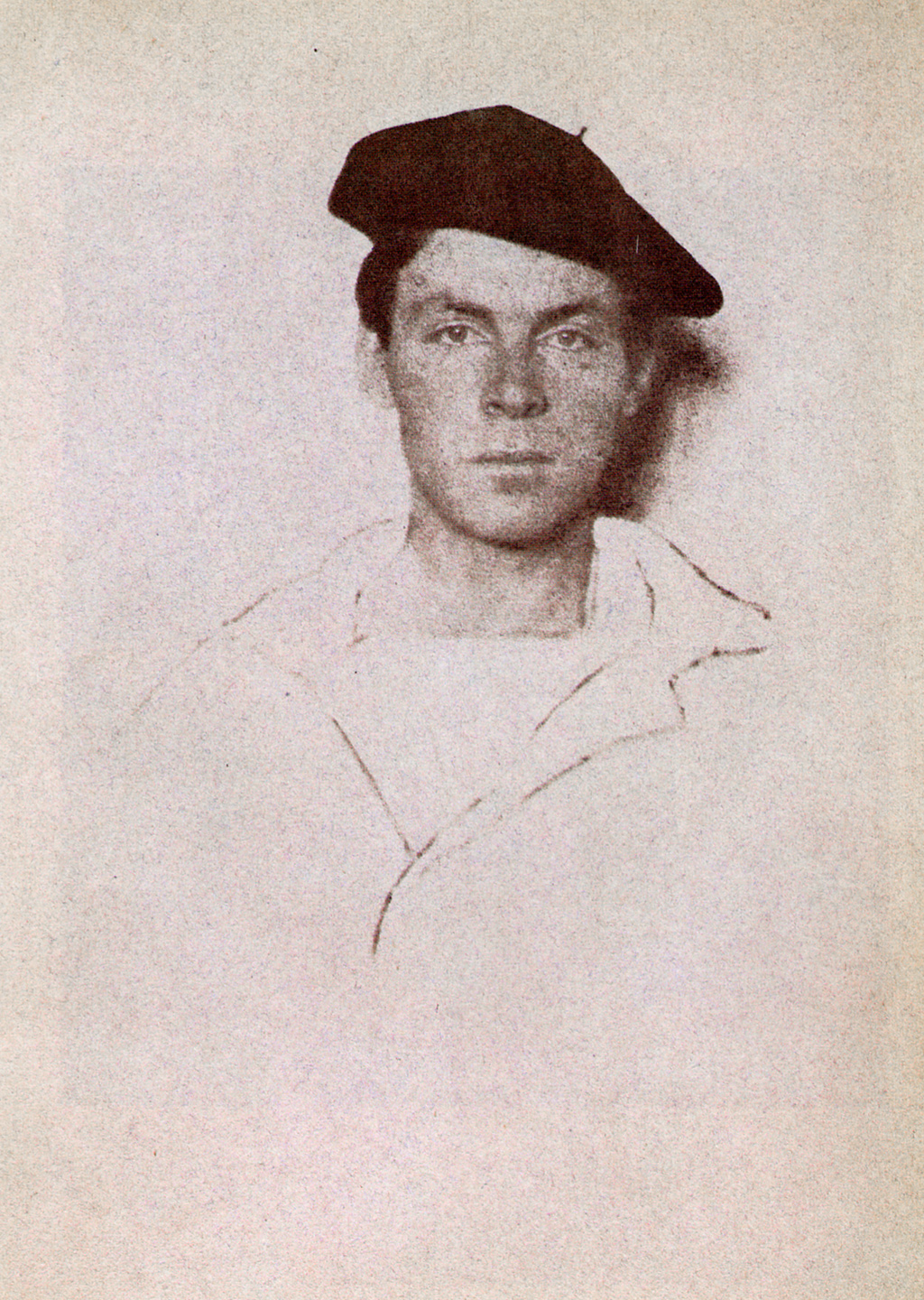
Mary Devens: Charcoal Effect. Photogravure published in Camera Notes, Vol 6 No 1, January 1902

== Life ==
Devens was born on 17 May 1857 in Ware, Massachusetts, the daughter of Arthur Lithgow Devens and Agnes Howard White Devens. She grew up in Cambridge, Massachusetts and developed an interest in photography sometime in early life. She had a strong interest in printing techniques that could be manipulated by the photographer, including ozotype, gum bichromate and platinum printing. She mastered the gum bichomate process so well that she gave a lecture on it to the Cambridge Photographic Club in 1896.

At some point before her mid-30s, Devens met Boston photographer F. Holland Day, who influenced her career through encouragement and advocacy of her work. He personally submitted five of her prints to the London Photographic Salon of 1898 and was responsible for introducing her to photographer Alfred Stieglitz, with whom she would regularly correspond for many years. Day also promoted her work in his lecture "Photography as Fine Art" at the Harvard Camera Club in 1900 and included several of her prints in his 1901 exhibition "The New School of American Photography."

Devens traveled to Europe in 1900-1901, where she met Edward Steichen and Robert Demachy. Demachy added several of her photographs to the important Paris exhibition of women photographers organized by Frances Benjamin Johnston.

In 1902 Devens was elected to Britain’s Linked Ring, and Stieglitz listed her as a founding member of the Photo-Secession. That same year Stieglitz also listed her as one of the ten most prominent American pictorial photographers in an article in Century Magazine. He also published one of her photographs in his journal Camera Work.

About this same time Devens’ eyesight began to fail rapidly due to an unknown cause. After 1904 she showed only a few prints in exhibitions. Stieglitz included her work in the inaugural exhibition at his Little Galleries of the Photo-Secession in 1905. She is not known to have engaged in any photographic activity after 1905.

Devens died on 13 March 1920 in Cambridge. A memorial exhibition of her work was held soon after her death in 1920 by the Society of Arts and Crafts.
