= Elizabeth Buehrmann =

American photographer and artist

"Bessie" Buehrmann
- Born: Elizabeth Buehrmann
- Died: 1965 (aged 78–79)
- Education: Art Institute of Chicago
- Known for: formal portraiture
- Patrons: Alfred Stieglitz

Elizabeth Buehrmann (c. 1886 – c. 1965) was born June 13, 1886, in Cape Girardeau, Missouri. Buehrmann was an American photographer and artist who was one of the pioneers of taking formal portraits of people in their own homes rather than in a studio.

== Early life and education ==
Per Ancestry.com Elizabeth Buehrmann was born in Missouri to her parents, Otto and Mary (Williams), who had 5 children, only of which two were living in the 1910 census. Otto was a salesman and was born in Hanover Germany, per the 1920 census. By 1920 Elizabeth's mother had died, so Otto moved to New York City with Elizabeth and lodged with her at 230 E. 11th Street. Otto was listed as a "lecturer and artist, private practice" in the 1920 census. She had a sister, Mary, that was 12 years older (and at the age of 35 was still single and living at home with her parents though had her occupation listed as "reader"). She lived at 129 E. 10th Street in June 1929.

She grew up in Chicago, and from her early success her family appears to have been financially well-off and socially connected. They rented a house at 5209 Jefferson Avenue in Chicago. At about the age of 15 she enrolled in painting and drawing classes at the Art Institute of Chicago. While she was still a teenager she began assisting Eva Watson-Schütze in her photography studio on West 57th Street, and it was there that she learned both the technical and aesthetic aspects of photography. She made such progress that by the time she was just 18 years old she was accepted as an Associate Member in Alfred Stieglitz's important Photo-Secession.

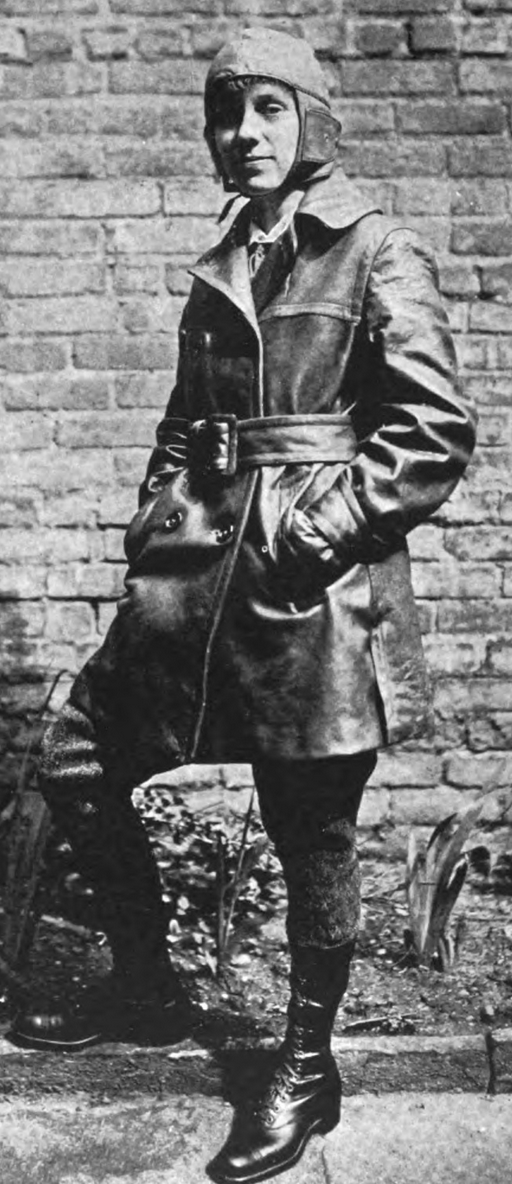
A photographer of Gertrude Emerson Sen by Buehrmann, in a 1920 publication

== Career ==
Buehrmann specialized in taking portraits of clients in their homes, and she never used artificial scenery or props. She said "I have never had a studio at home but take my pictures in houses. A person is always much more apt to be natural, and then I can get different background effects." She also did not pose her subjects; instead she would "spend several hours getting acquainted with her subjects before attempting to reproduce the character found in an interesting face." Leading businessmen and diplomats commissioned her as well as prominent society women, and she was well known for both her artistry and her ability to capture "some of the soul along with the physical features of her sitters."

In 1905, Buhermann was holding exhibits in Chicago.

In 1906–07, she spent a year living in London and Paris in order to learn the latest techniques and styles of European photographers. As another sign of her prominence, she was invited to join the Photo-club de Paris, where she worked for several months.

When she returned, the Art Institute of Chicago gave her a large exhibition of 61 prints, including portraits, landscapes, and still lifes. Included among her portraits were photographs of Alvin Langdon Coburn, Robert Demachy, Russell Thorndike, Fannie Zeisler, Sydney Greenstreet and Helena Modjeska.

In 1909 Stieglitz included three of her prints in the prominent National Arts Club exhibition which he organized. Another photographer, Robert Demachy, insisted her prints be included in an important show he was organizing in Paris the next year. She is shown as still living with her parents, in Chicago, in the 1910 census. She continued doing portraiture until the late 1910s when she began exploring the then relatively new market for advertising photography. She spent the next decade working on a variety of advertising commissions. Her last known commercial photography took place in the early 1930s.

She sailed from Villefranche France on December 27, arriving in the Port of New York on January 3, 1935, listing her address as "Galen Hall, Atlantic City, NJ" and was still single. She took many trips to France, including 1929, 1932, and 1935.

In 1940 she moved to St. Augustine, Florida, where she took up ceramics. An exhibit of her ceramic work was shown at the Lowe Gallery at the University of Miami in the early 1950s.

Buehrmann died in March 1965, Dade Florida.

Collections of Buhermann's work are held by The Art Institute of Chicago, the Metropolitan Museum of Art, and the New York Public Library.
