= T. O'Conor Sloane Jr. =

Photographer

Thomas O’Conor Sloane, Jr. (1879–1963) was an American photographer.

== Early life and career ==
Sloane was born in 1879 in Brooklyn, New York but spent much of his adult life in South Orange, New Jersey. Sloane was already photographing by the summer of 1894, when he photographically documented a week-long cruise with his father on a sloop yacht on Long Island Sound. Pictures of this trip survive in an album he compiled that is now at the Mystic Seaport Museum, Mystic, Connecticut.

Sloane was most active as a naturalistic photographer at the turn of the twentieth century, garnering acclaim for his gum bichromate work.

In Sloane's early twenties, he focused primarily on portraiture, becoming a professional sometime thereafter and remaining active until the 1940s, when a diving accident severely impaired his eyesight.

Sloane experimented with gum bichromate, platinum, pigment, gaslight and gelatin silver prints and various lenses.

Sloane graduated from Columbia University in New York City with a degree in electrical engineering like his father, Dr. T. O'Conor Sloane, a noted scientist, prodigious author of scientific books and articles, and the editor of Scientific American and Amazing Stories. Sloane briefly taught electrical engineering and was a research assistant at Columbia, also working independently as an electrical engineer, before becoming a professional photographer.

== Photo-Secession movement ==
Sloane began exhibiting with Alfred Stieglitz's (Portrait of Thomas O'Conor Sloane Jr by Stieglitz, c. early 1900s) cadre of artistic amateur photographers at The Camera Club of New York and in 1902 was an original member of the influential Photo-Secession movement, with his work appearing in that year's National Arts Club exhibition.

Sloane maintained a long friendship with fellow Photo-Secessionist and West Redding, Connecticut resident, photographer Edward Steichen.

== Exhibitions and publications ==
In addition to exhibitions in New York City, Sloane's photographs were exhibited in Chicago and Philadelphia in 1900, London in 1901 and Turin in 1902.

Sloane's photographs appeared in Photo Beacon (June 1900), Camera Notes (October 1900), Photographic Times (November 1900 and January 1904), The American Annual of Photography (1901) and Camera Work, No. 3 (July 1903).

An article he wrote, "Photography as a Craft," appeared in the January 1920 edition of The Photo-Miniature.

By 1931 Sloane had relocated to Westport, Connecticut where in 1935 he was commissioned by the Westport Preservation Alliance (WPA) Federal Arts Project to photograph the historic houses of Westport and environs. His photos were black and white using glass plate negatives. A gum print that he created during this time was shown at the Connecticut Tercentenary exhibition in New Haven.

== Museums and collections ==
Sloane's photographic work can be found in art auctions, public and private collections, exhibitions, university archives and museums across the nation, including four pieces in the Hallmark Photographic Collection, now held by The Nelson-Atkins Museum of Art in Kansas City, Missouri; nine pieces in the collection of the Addison Gallery of American Art, in Andover, Massachusetts; [Untitled: man harvesting] (c. 1900) in the collection of the Minneapolis Institute of Art in Minneapolis, Minnesota; New York City Construction Site (c. 1900) in the collection of the Milwaukee Art Museum in Milwaukee, Wisconsin; Tree Study (c. 1905) in the Carnegie Museum of Art in Pittsburgh, Pennsylvania; Landscape with Trees (c. 1905) in the collection of the Saint Louis Art Museum in St. Louis, Missouri; Cloud Study (c. 1910) in the collection of The Metropolitan Museum of Art in New York City, New York; and Thomas Alva Edison (c. 1914) in the collection of the National Portrait Gallery of The Smithsonian in Washington, D.C.

== Family ==
Sloane married Gertrude Gabrielle Larned (October 4, 1878 - January 17, 1954) of Washington, D.C., an author best known for the children's book Fun with Folk Tales: Six Plays in Verse with Music and Songs (E. P. Dutton, 1942). Together they had four children, including T. O'Conor Sloane III, a senior editor at Doubleday. She died on January 17, 1954 in Norwalk, Connecticut.

Sloane's brother, John Eyre Sloane, a Columbia graduate and an airplane factory owner, married Thomas Edison's daughter Madeleine.

Sloane's great-grandson is Justin T. O'Conor Sloane, an author, publisher and the editor of Worlds of IF magazine and Galaxy Science Fiction magazine.
