= Ida C. Haskell =

American painter

- Born: April 24, 1861; California
- Died: September 28, 1932 (aged 71); Brookhaven, New York
- Known for: Painting
- Partner: Alice Boughton

Ida Cole Haskell (April 24, 1861 – September 28, 1932) was an American painter and educator. She is known for her landscape and genre paintings. She taught painting at the Pratt Institute.

== Biography ==
Haskell was born in 1861 in California. She studied art at the Art Institute of Chicago, the Art Students League of New York, the Pennsylvania Academy of the Fine Arts, and the Academie Julian in Paris. After living in several locations in the United States she settled in New York to teach at the Pratt Institute. She lived with the photographer Alice Boughton.

Haskell was a member of the National Association of Women Painters and Sculptors.

Haskell exhibited her work at the Palace of Fine Arts at the 1893 World's Columbian Exposition in Chicago, Illinois.

Haskell died on September 28, 1932 in Brookhaven, New York.

== Gallery ==
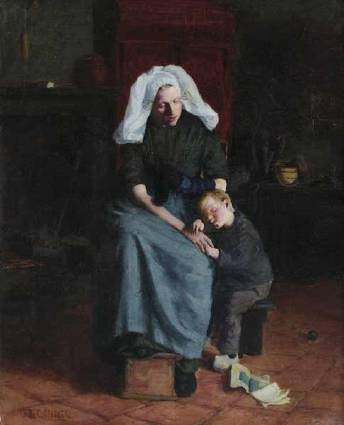
Mother Love 1890

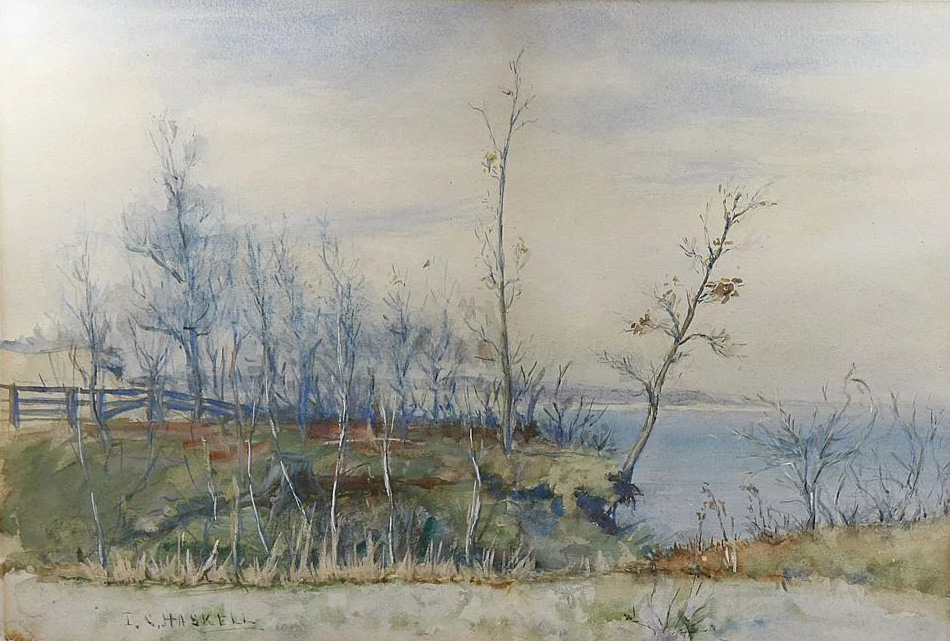
Impressionist Coastal Scene
