= John Eyre Sloane =

American industrialist (1886–1970)

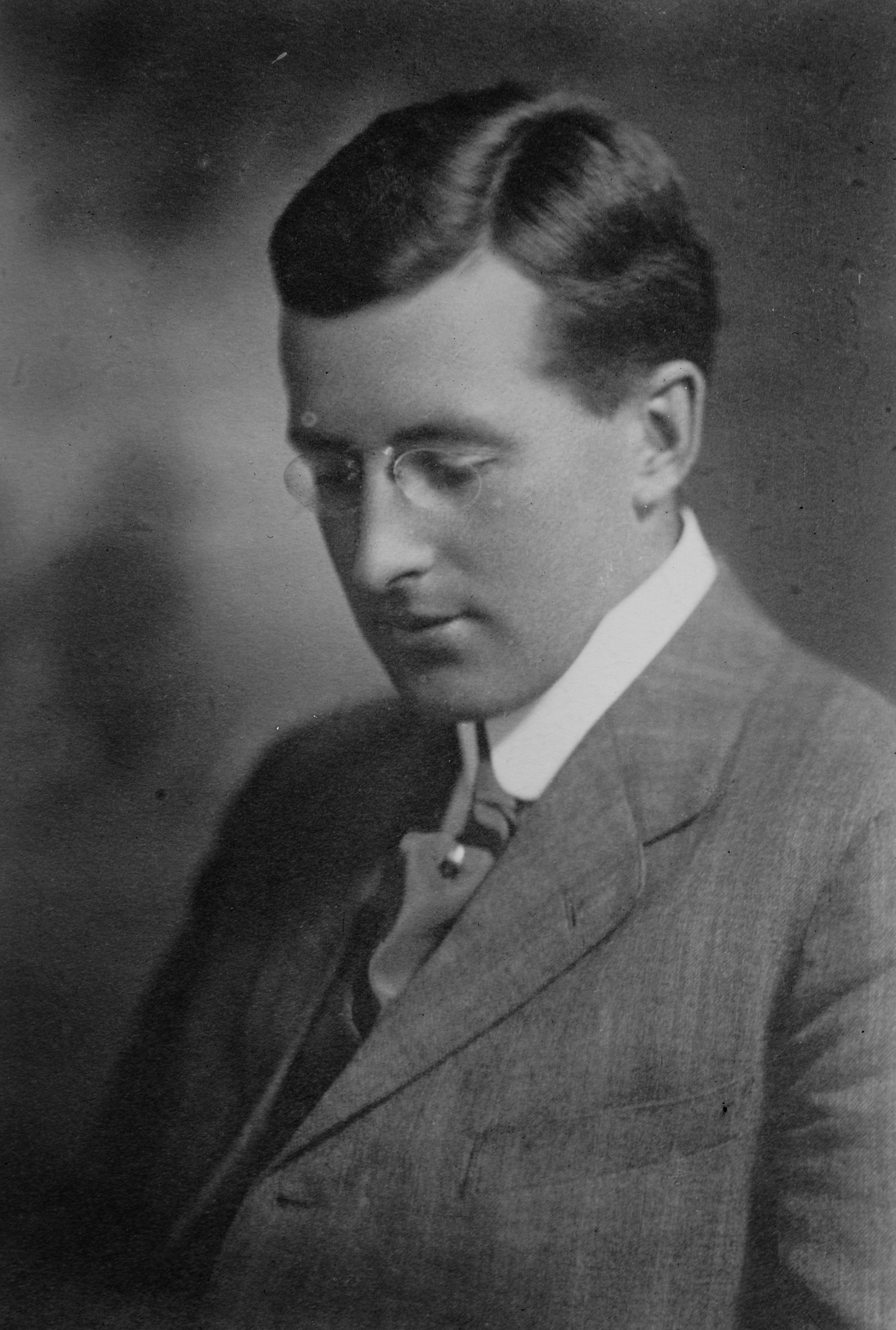
- Sloane, c. 1914
- Born: September 16, 1886; South Orange, New Jersey, U.S.
- Died: July 17, 1970 (aged 83); Easton, Maryland, U.S.
- Education: Columbia University
- Occupation: Airplane manufacturer
- Spouse: Madeleine Edison (m. 1914)
- Children: 4

John Eyre Sloane (September 16, 1886 – July 17, 1970) was an American industrialist.

He was born in South Orange, New Jersey, to well-known scientist, inventor and author, Dr. T. O'Conor Sloane. He established one of the country's first airplane manufacturing plants in Long Island City, Queens, New York City in 1912.

== Early life and education ==
Sloane was born on September 16, 1886. He graduated from Columbia University in 1908.

== Career ==
He established Sloane Manufacturing Co. in 1915, which was later reorganized into Standard Aircraft Corporation and sold to Mitsui & Co.

== Personal life and death ==
He married Thomas Edison's daughter, Madeleine, and they had four sons, Thomas Edison Sloane, John Edison Sloane, Michael Edison Sloane and Peter Edison Sloane. He died in 1970. He was the younger brother of photographer T. O'Conor Sloane Jr.
