= Alice Boughton =

American photographer (1866–1943)

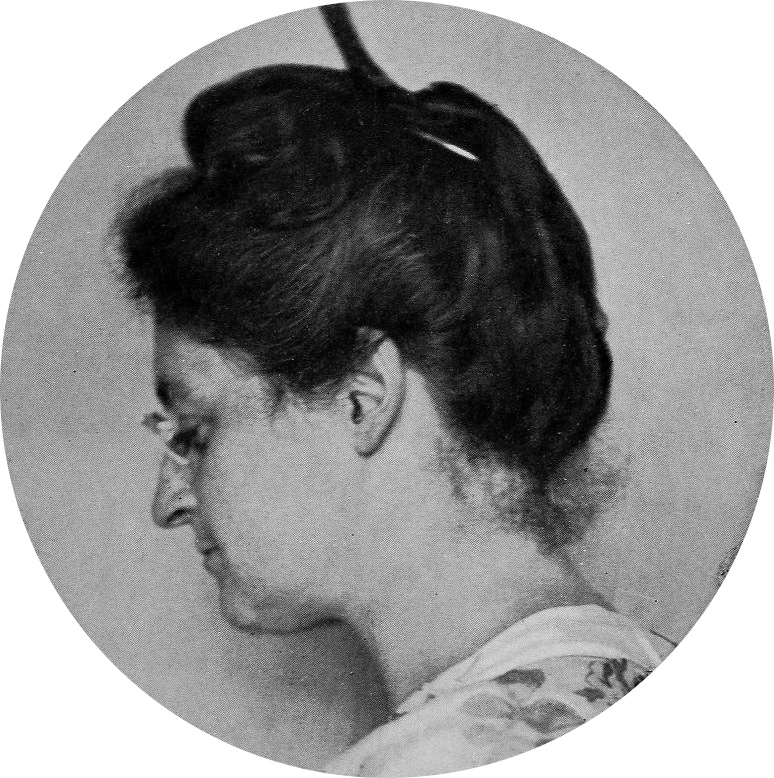
- Boughton, c. 1916
- Born: May 14, 1866; Brooklyn, New York, U.S.
- Died: June 21, 1943 (aged 77); Bay Shore, New York, U.S.
- Occupation: Photographer
- Years active: 1890–1931

Alice Boughton (14 May 1866 – 21 June 1943) was an early 20th-century American photographer known for her photographs of many literary and theatrical figures of her time. She was a Fellow of Alfred Stieglitz's Photo-Secession, a circle of photographers whose artistic efforts succeeded in raising photography to a fine art form.

== Life ==
Alice Boughton was born in Brooklyn, New York, on 14 May 1866. Her parents were Frances Ayres and William H. Boughton, a lawyer in New York. She studied photography and became a well known portrait photographer in New York by the early 1900s. Outside of her art production she was active in Feminist and Socialist causes utilizing photography as a form of personal expression.

Being active in the Feminist scene Alice was a prominent member of the movement known as New Woman. Artwork made by women was considered to be inferior, and to help overcome that stereotype women became "increasingly vocal and confident" in promoting women's work, and thus became part of the emerging image of the educated, modern and freer "New Woman". Artists like Boughton then, "played crucial roles in representing the New Woman, both by drawing images of the icon and exemplifying this emerging type through their own lives."

From at least 1920 until her death, Boughton shared her residences with artist and art teacher Ida C. Haskell (1861–1932). Haskell is known to have been an instructor at Pratt while Käsebier and Boughton studied there. When Boughton traveled to Europe in 1926, Haskell, her partner, accompanied her on the trip.

== Photography career ==
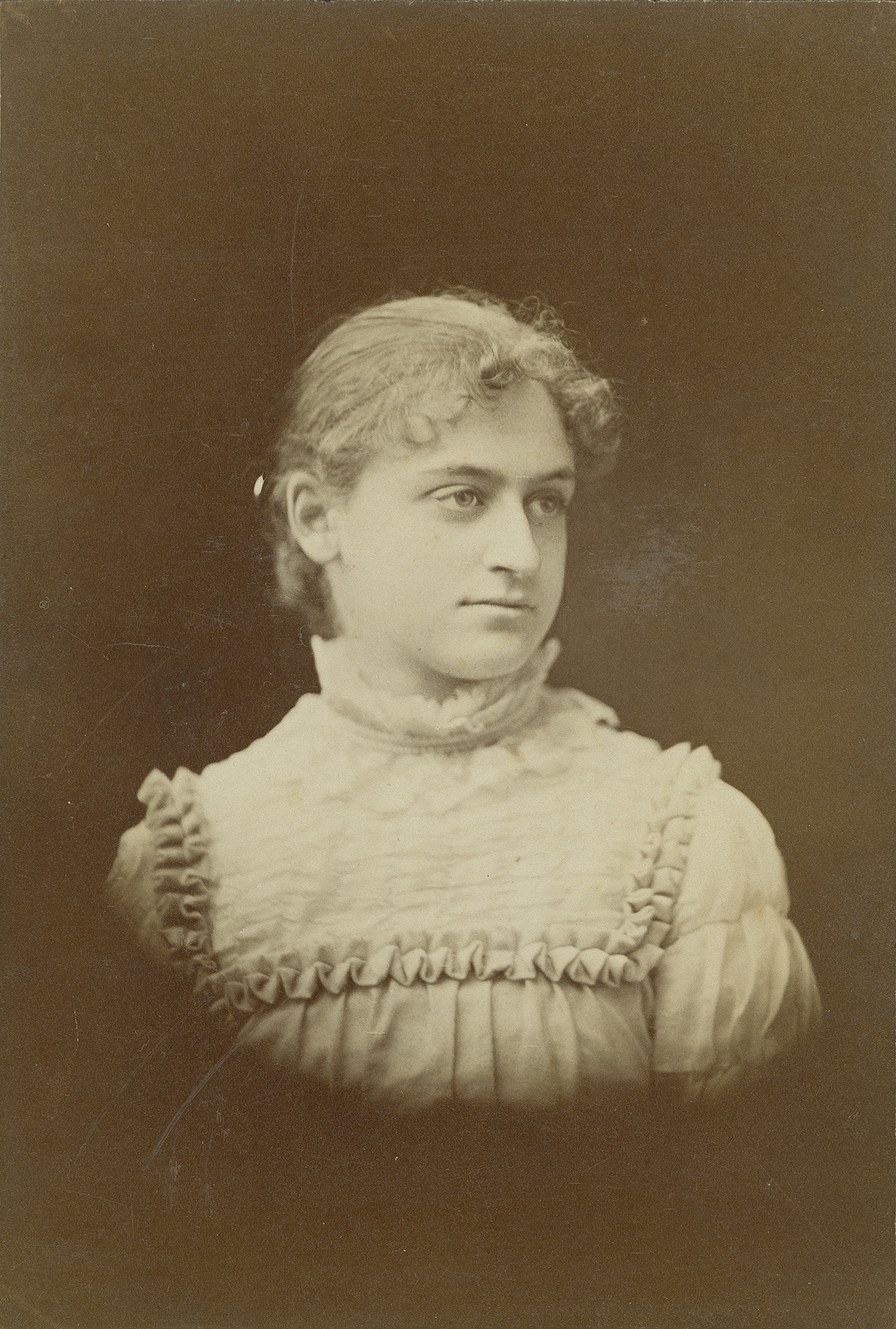
Alice Boughton, 1883, albumen print by Sandford Bennett Duryea, Department of Image Collections, National Gallery of Art Library, Washington, DC

In the 1880s, Boughton began studying art and photography at the Pratt School of Art and Design. It was there that she met fellow student Gertrude Käsebier, with whom she later studied in Paris. Käsebier also employed her an assistant in her studio, most likely at the same time Boughton was studying at Pratt.

In 1890, she opened her own portrait studio on East 23rd Street in New York, which she maintained for the next forty years. In 1904, she sent a letter to William Butler Yeats that listed a studio address on Madison Avenue, indicating that she established or used more than one studio for at least a brief period.

Around 1901, Boughton studied art in Rome and photography in Paris, where she worked in Käsebier's summer studio. She won an honorable mention for her work at the Turin International Decorative and Fine Arts Exhibition in 1902.

Although Boughton became one of the most distinguished portrait photographers of New York during her time, she also produced landscapes and photographs of children. She did many landscapes in this country and Europe including the Rockefeller estate Kykuit at Pocantico Hills, New York. Continually she produced studies of children, as well as female nudes in allegorical or natural settings. Among her more famous works are portraits of Eugene O'Neill, Albert Pinkham Ryder, George Arliss, Robert Louis Stevenson, and Agnes Lawrence Pelton. Her portrait of Robert Louis Stevenson was an inspiration for John Singer Sargent's own portrait of the writer.

== Relationship with Stieglitz ==
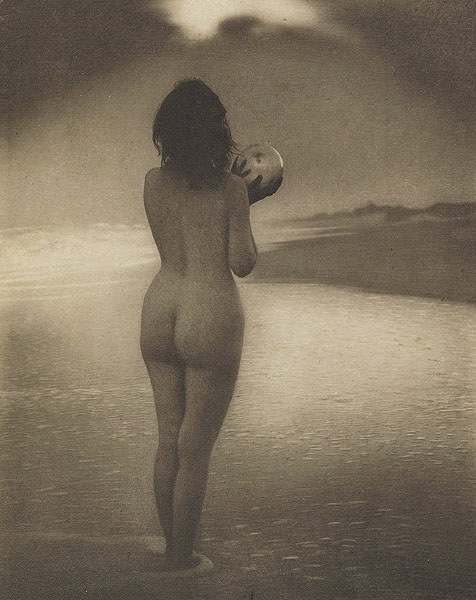
"Dawn", by Alice Boughton. The photogravure was published in Camera Work, 1909

As Boughton's photography career grew she became noticed by famous photographers in her field, like Alfred Stieglitz. It is not known when she met Stieglitz, but it is clear he knew of and admired her work by 1902 when he included two of her works in the inaugural exhibition at his Little Galleries of the Photo-Secession in New York City. This relationship continued for many years as in 1906, Boughton was appointed by Stieglitz as a Fellow of the Photo-Secession. The Photo-Secession artists worked to "secede" from what they thought was the mainstream art of the time. The following year Stieglitz gave her, along with fellow photographers C. Yarnall Abbott and William B. Dyer, an exhibition at the Little Galleries. In 1909 she had six of her photographs and an essay called “Photography, A Medium of Expression” published in Stieglitz's journal Camera Work (No 26, April, 1909).

While Stieglitz was promoting and including her work in his exhibitions, Boughton was also receiving recognition for her photography from other major independent exhibitions around the world, including shows in London, Paris, Vienna, The Hague and New York.

== Later life ==
In 1931, Boughton closed her studio and discarded thousands of prints. She moved permanently to the home in Brookhaven, Long Island, that she shared with Haskell.

Boughton died of pneumonia on 21 June 1943.

Her works are in the permanent collections of the Museum of Modern Art, the British National Portrait Gallery, the George Eastman Museum, the Amon Carter Museum of American Art, the Brooklyn Museum, the Minneapolis Institute of Arts, the University of Michigan Museum of Art, the Hood Museum of Art, the Metropolitan Museum of Art, the Princeton University Art Museum, and others.

== Work and publications ==
A collection of her portraits, Photographing the Famous, was published in 1928, and included William Butler Yeats, Julia Ward Howe, Henry James, Walter de la Mare, G. K. Chesterton, Maxim Gorky, John Burroughs, Ruth St. Denis, Eleonora Duse and Yvette Guilbert as subjects.

Her work was also published in Camera Work in 1909.

- Boughton, Alice (1928). Photographing the Famous. New York: Avondale Press.
- Boughton, Alice (1909). Camera Work.

== External Sources ==
- Guide to the Irene Tufts Mead Collection of Alice Boughton Photographs 1904 at the University of Chicago Special Collections Research Center
