= Robert S. Redfield =

American photographer

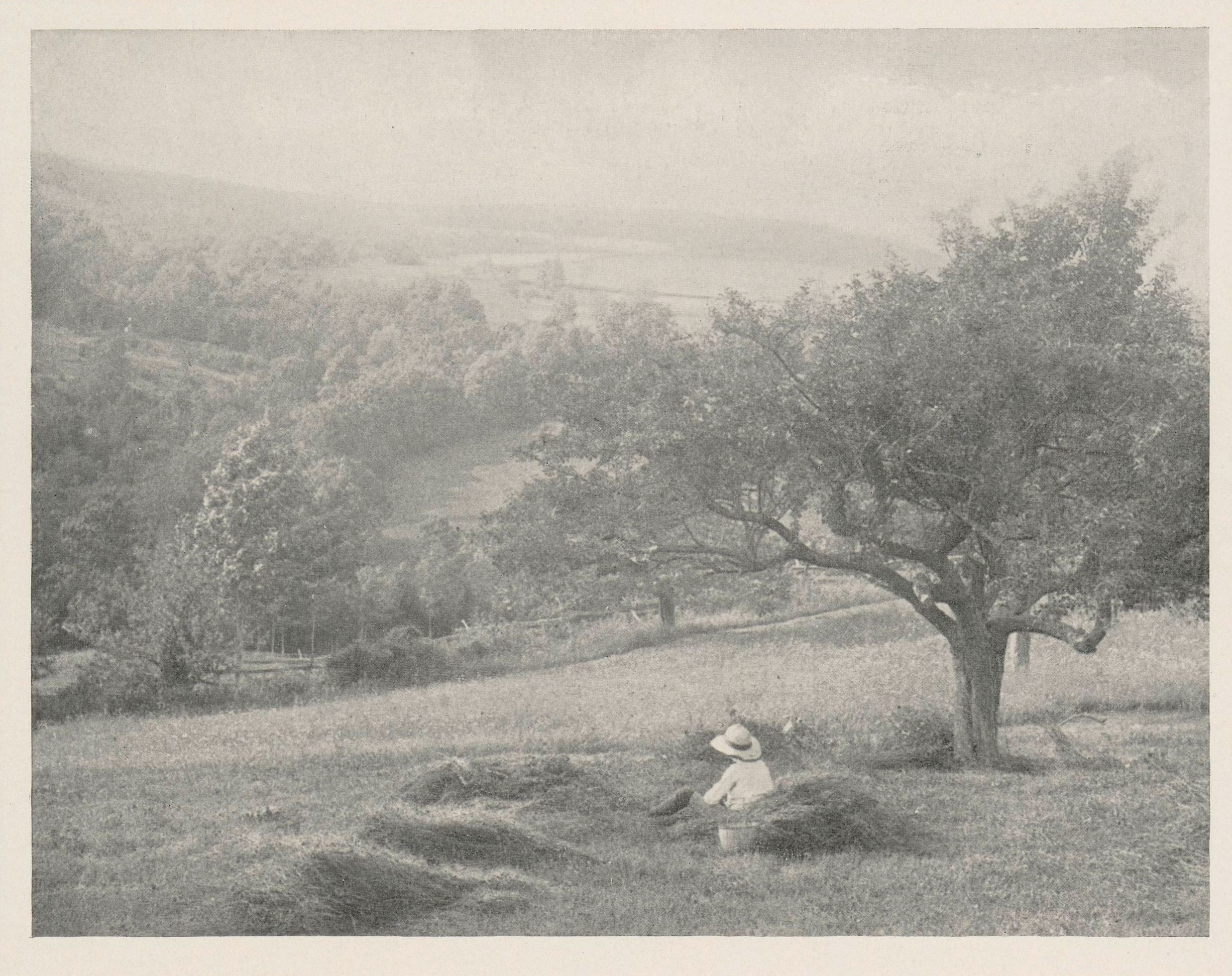
A New England Landscape - c. 1900

Robert Stuart Redfield (2 May 1849 – 28 Apr 1921) was an American photographer from Philadelphia involved in pictorialism. He was a president of the Photographic Society of Philadelphia and a founding member of the Photo-Secession movement. Redfield was born in New York City, the third child of Mary Jane and John Howard Redfield. He married Mary Thibault Guillou, and with her had four children, including the mathematician J. Howard Redfield and the naturalist Alfred C. Redfield.
