= Alvin Langdon Coburn =

American photographer (1882–1966)

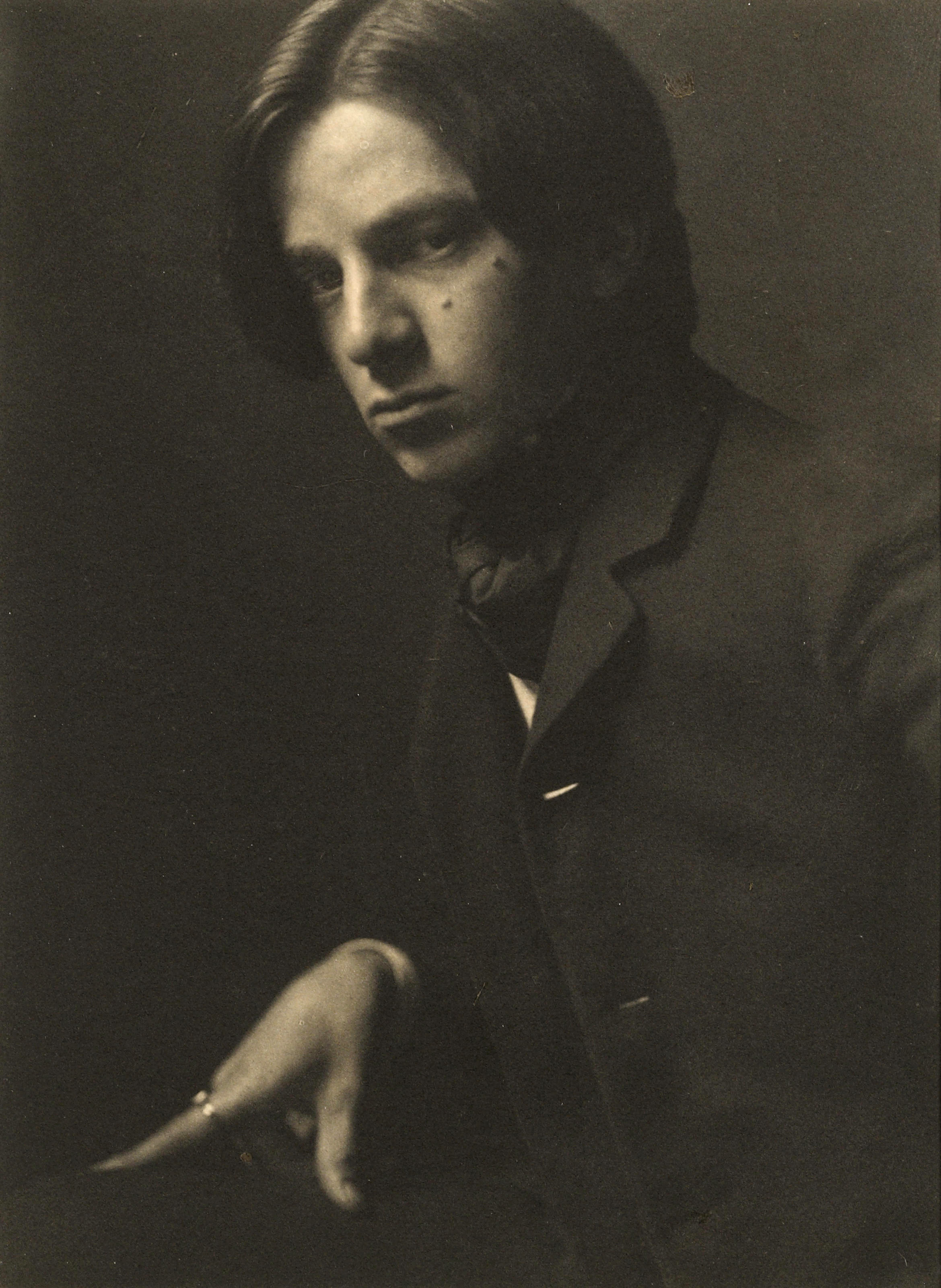
- Self-portrait, 1905
- Born: June 11, 1882; Boston, Massachusetts, U.S.
- Died: November 23, 1966 (aged 84); Rhos-on-Sea, Colwyn Bay, Wales
- Known for: Photography

Alvin Langdon Coburn (June 11, 1882 – November 23, 1966) was an American photographer who became a key figure in the development of pictorialism. He became the first major photographer to emphasize the visual potential of elevated viewpoints and later made some of the first completely abstract photographs.

== Life ==
=== Childhood (1882–1899) ===
Coburn was born on June 11, 1882, at 134 East Springfield Street in Boston, Massachusetts, to a middle-class family. His father, who had established the successful firm of Coburn & Whitman Shirts, died when Alvin was seven. After that he was raised solely by his mother, Fannie, who remained the primary influence in his early life, even though she remarried when he was a teenager. In his autobiography, Coburn wrote: "My mother was a remarkable woman of very strong character who tried to dominate my life…It was a battle royal all the days of our life together."

In 1890, the family visited his maternal uncles in Los Angeles, and they gave him a 4 x 5 Kodak camera. He immediately fell in love with the camera, and within a few years he had developed a remarkable talent for both visual composition and technical proficiency in the darkroom. When he was 16 years old, in 1898, he met his cousin F. Holland Day, who was already an internationally known photographer with considerable influence. Day recognized Coburn's talent and both mentored him and encouraged him to take up photography as a career.

At the end of 1899, his mother and he moved to London, where they met up with Day. Day had been invited by the Royal Photographic Society to select prints from the best American photographers for an exhibition in London. He brought more than a hundred photographs with him, including nine by Coburn – who at this time was only 17 years old. With the help of his cousin Coburn's career took a giant first step.

=== Rise to fame (1900–1905) ===
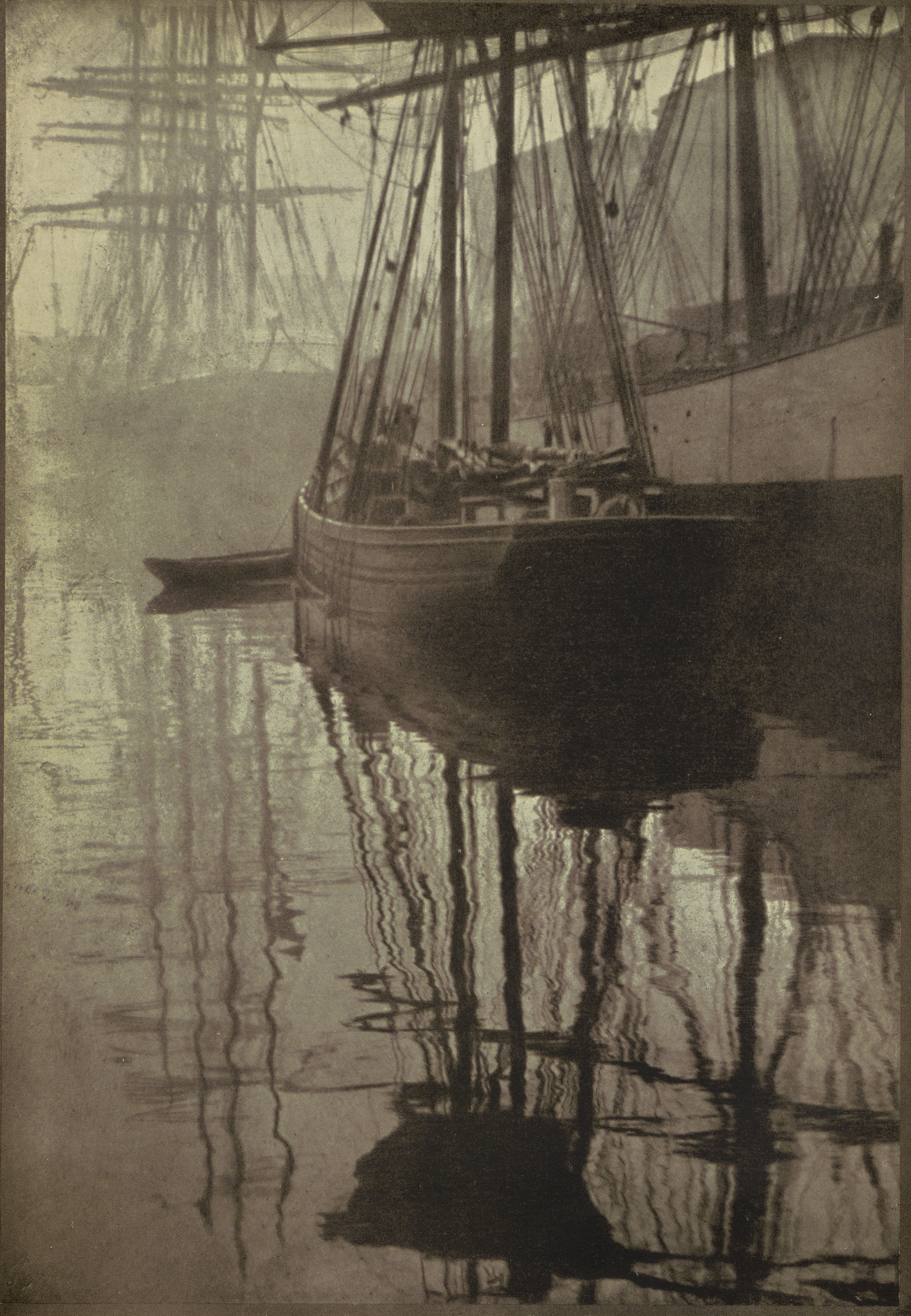
"Spider-webs", by Alvin Langdon Coburn. Photogravure published in Camera Work, No 21, 1908

Coburn's prints at the Royal Photographic Society attracted the attention of another important photographer, Frederick H. Evans. Evans was one of the founders of the Linked Ring, an association of artistic photographers that was considered at that time to be the highest authority for photographic aesthetics. In the summer of 1900 Coburn was invited to exhibit with them, which elevated him to the ranks of some of the most elite photographers of the day.

In 1901, Coburn lived in Paris for a few months so he could study with photographer Edward Steichen and Robert Demachy. He and his mother then toured France, Switzerland and Germany for the remainder of the year.

When they returned to America in 1902, Coburn began studying with famed photographer Gertrude Käsebier in New York. He opened a photography studio on Fifth Avenue but spent much of his time that year studying with Arthur Wesley Dow at his School of Art in Massachusetts. At the same time, his mother continued to promote her son whenever she could. Stieglitz once told an interviewer, "Fannie Coburn devoted much energy trying to convince both Day and me that Alvin was a greater photographer than Steichen."

The following year Coburn was elected as an Associate of The Linked Ring, making him one of the youngest members of that group and one of only a few Americans to be so honoured. In May he was given his first one-man show at the Camera Club of New York, and in July Stieglitz published one of his gravures in Camera Work, No. 3.

In 1904, Coburn returned to London with a commission from The Metropolitan Magazine to photograph England's leading artists and writers, including G. K. Chesterton, George Meredith, and H. G. Wells. During this trip he visited renowned pictorialist J. Craig Annan in Edinburgh and made studies of motifs photographed by pioneering photographers David Octavius Hill and Robert Adamson. Six more of his images were published in Camera Work, No. 6 (April 1904). In 1905, he photographed American artist Leon Dabo.

Coburn remained in London throughout 1905 and much of 1906, taking both portraits and landscapes around England. He photographed Henry James for The Century magazine and returned to Edinburgh for a series he intended to be visualizations of Robert Louis Stevenson's Edinburgh: Picturesque Notes.

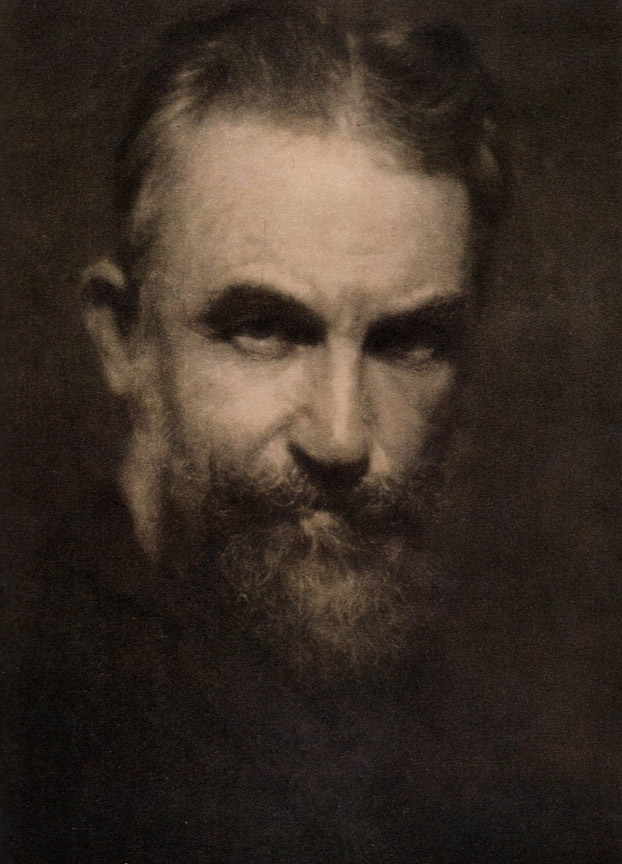
"Bernard Shaw", by Alvin Langdon Coburn. Photogravure published in Camera Work, No 21, 1908

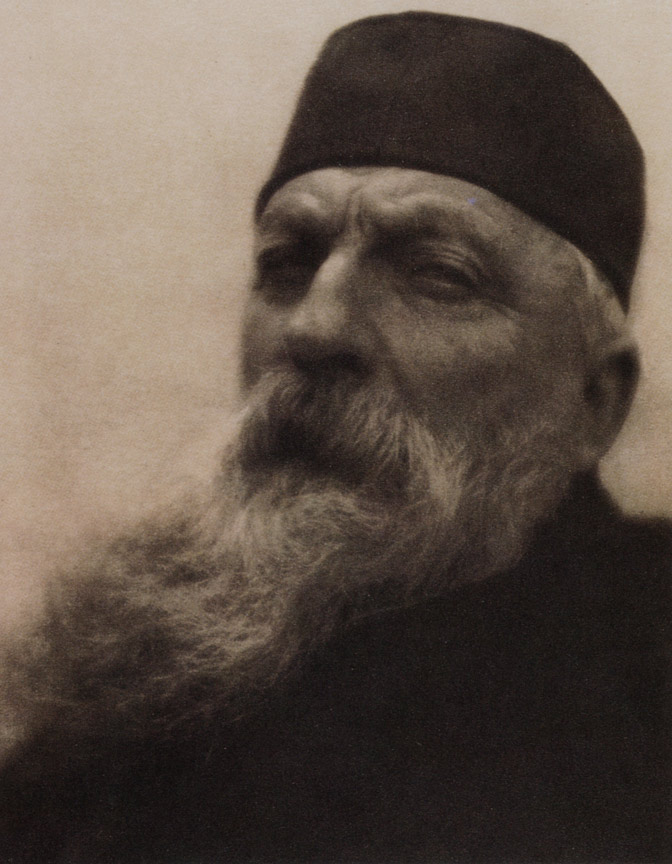
"Rodin", by Alvin Langdon Coburn. Photogravure published in Camera Work, No 21, 1908

=== Symbolist period (1906–1912) ===
The years 1906–07 were some of the most prolific and important for Coburn. He began 1906 by having one-man shows at the Royal Photographic Society (accompanied by a catalog with a preface by George Bernard Shaw) and at the Liverpool Amateur Photographic Association. In July five more gravures were published in Camera Work (No. 15). At the same time he began to study photogravure printing at the London County Council School of Photo-Engraving. It was during this time that Coburn made one of his most famous portraits, that of George Bernard Shaw posing nude as Rodin's The Thinker.

In the summer he cruised round the Mediterranean and traveled to Paris, Rome and Venice in the fall while working on frontispieces for an American edition of Henry James' novels. While in Paris he saw Steichen's Autochrome color photographs and learned the process from him.

By 1907, Coburn was so well established in his career that Shaw called him "the greatest photographer in the world," although he was only 24 years old at the time. He continued his success by having a one-man show at Stieglitz's prestigious Little Galleries of the Photo-Secession in New York and by organizing an international exhibition of photography at the New English Art Galleries in London. At the request of American art collector Charles Lang Freer, Coburn briefly returned to the U.S. so he could photograph Freer's large collection of oriental art and James McNeill Whistler prints. Coburn became captivated with the "exotic" style of the oriental artists, and it began to have an influence in both his thinking and his photography.

In January 1908, twelve more of Coburn's photographs were published in Camera Work (No. 21). In the same issue there was an anonymous article that leveled some harsh words at him:

Coburn has been a favored child throughout his career... No other photographer has been so extensively exploited nor so generally eulogized. He enjoys it all; is amused at the conflicting opinions about him and his work, and, like all strong individuals, is conscious that he knows best what he wants and what he is driving at. Being talked about is his only recreation.

The author was probably Stieglitz, who sometimes delighted in both promoting and castigating a photographer, especially if he felt the person was becoming too conceited. The criticism did not seem to have a long-term effect on their relationship, as both continued to be close colleagues for many years.

In the spring Coburn had another one-man show, this time at the Goupil Galleries in New York. Soon afterwards he wrote to Stieglitz: "Printing almost entirely in gray now... think it a reaction from the autochromes.…" In the summer he visited Dublin, where he made portraits of W. B. Yeats and George Moore. He continued his travels that year with trips to Bavaria and Holland.

The same year, H. G. Wells contacted him to consider a collaboration edition of The Door in the Wall and Other Stories. A few years later, an edition of 600 copies, 60 of them signed by the author and the photographer, eventually appeared; this edition was first reissued in 2018 by the Folio Society.

The next year Stieglitz gave Coburn his second one-man exhibition at his gallery, which by then had come to be known simply as "291". Another sign of Coburn's prominence at that time was that Stieglitz had only given two shows to one other photographer – Edward Steichen. Back in London, Coburn bought a new home with a large studio area where he set up two printing presses. He proceeded to use the skills he had learned at the County Council School to publish a book of his own photographs called London.

Coburn returned to America in 1910, exhibiting 26 prints at the Albright-Knox Art Gallery in Buffalo, New York. He began traveling extensively in the U.S. for the next year, going to Arizona to photograph the Grand Canyon and to California to take photos in Yosemite National Park. He came back to New York in 1912 and took a series of new photos which he published in his book New York. It was during this period that he made some of his most famous photographs from elevated viewpoints, including his best known image The Octopus.

While in New York he met and married Edith Wightman Clement of Boston on October 11, 1912. In November Coburn and his wife returned to England, and after twenty-three transatlantic crossings he never again returned to the United States.

=== Explorations (1913–1923) ===
Coburn continued to build his fame by publishing what would become his most famous book, Men of Mark, in 1913. The book featured 33 gravure prints of important European and American authors, artists and statesmen, including Henri Matisse, Henry James, Auguste Rodin, Mark Twain, Theodore Roosevelt and Yeats. In the preface to the book, he says:

To make satisfactory photographs of persons it is necessary for me to like them, to admire them, or at least to be interested in them. It is rather curious and difficult to exactly explain, but if I dislike my subject it is sure to come out in the resulting portrait . I had thought of using 'Men of Genius' as the title for this book, but Arnold Bennett objected seriously, saying, very modestly, that he did not consider himself a man of genius, but merely a working author, and absolutely refusing to join the throng unless I changed it, so I told him that if he would give me a better one I would use it. 'Men of Mark' is his alternative.

In 1915, Coburn organized the exhibition Old Masters of Photography, shown at the Royal Photographic Society in London and at the Albright-Knox Art Gallery in the U.S. The show included many historical prints from Coburn's own collection.

The following year two pivotal events occurred in his life. He met George Davison, a fellow photographer and a philanthropist who was involved in Theosophy and Freemasonry. This started Coburn on a path of studying mysticism, metaphysical ideals and Druidism. He met Ezra Pound, who introduced him to the short-lived Vorticism movement in Britain. Its new visual aesthetics intrigued Coburn and, provoked by his growing spiritual quest, he began to re-examine his photographic style. He responded by making a bold and distinctive portrait of Pound, showing three overlapping images of differing sizes. Within a brief period he moved from this semi-representative image to a series of abstract images that are among the first completely non-representative photographs ever made.

To make these images Coburn invented a kaleidoscope-like instrument with three mirrors clamped together, which when fitted over the lens of the camera would reflect and fracture the image. Pound called this instrument a "Vortoscope" and the resulting photographs "Vortographs". He made only about 18 different Vortographs, taken over a period of just one month, yet they remain among the most striking images in early 20th-century photography.

In 1917, he had a show of Vortographs and paintings at the Camera Club in London. He had recently started painting, in what Ezra Pound called Post-Impressionist style, and the combination of "second-rate" paintings along with his highly unusual photographs received mixed reviews. Stieglitz in particular did not like the change in Coburn's imagery, and he rejected several prints for a show he was putting together.

On June 18, 1919, he was initiated into Mawddach Masonic Lodge No. 1988 in Barmouth and was a member until he resigned on September 28, 1961. Coburn became increasingly involved with the Freemasons, achieving the title of Royal Arch Mason. He also joined the Societas Rosicruciana and delved further into metaphysical studies. Eventually he would devote most of his life to these studies, foregoing photography as his primary interest.

In 1922, Coburn briefly returned to his roots when he published More Men of Mark, a second book of portraits he had taken more than 10 years earlier. This volume included previously unpublished photographs of subjects who included Pound, Thomas Hardy, Frank Harris, Joseph Conrad, Israel Zangwill and Edmund Dulac.

=== Spiritual devotion (1923–1930) ===
In 1923, Coburn met a man who would become a major influence on him for the rest of his life. The man was one of the leaders of the Universal Order, a small comparative religious group, previously called the Order of Ancient Wisdom, and which under the name Hermetic Truth Society organized public lectures and produced the quarterly Shrine of Wisdom magazine. The identity of the man – described as being great and good in every way – was known to Coburn, but it has been kept from anyone outside of the Order due to the Society's strict doctrine of anonymity. There was something about him, however, that struck a chord with Coburn, and "Coburn's solidity as a citizen and the falling-away of all mundane ambition thereafter was due to his direct influence."

Throughout the 1920s and 1930s, Coburn became fully committed to the beliefs of the Universal Order, which are described in The Shrine of Wisdom magazine as being devoted to "Synthetic Philosophy, Religion and Mysticism". His deep interest in mysticism, and especially freemasonry, was to occupy the greatest part of the remainder of his life. Coburn did much research into the history of freemasonry, as well as on aspects of the occult and mysticism. He presented numerous lectures based on his findings to Masonic gatherings, travelling extensively throughout England and Wales. He also took a particular interest in the ceremonial rituals and rites performed, and in their origins and symbolism.

In 1927, Coburn was made an honorary Ovate of the Welsh Gorsedd, or Council of Druids, and he took the Welsh name "Maby-y-Trioedd" (Son of the Triads). In 1928, his mother died. She had been a major influence on him for much of his life, and her death was yet one more sign that his new devotion to religious interests was the right course for him.

=== Later life (1931–1966) ===
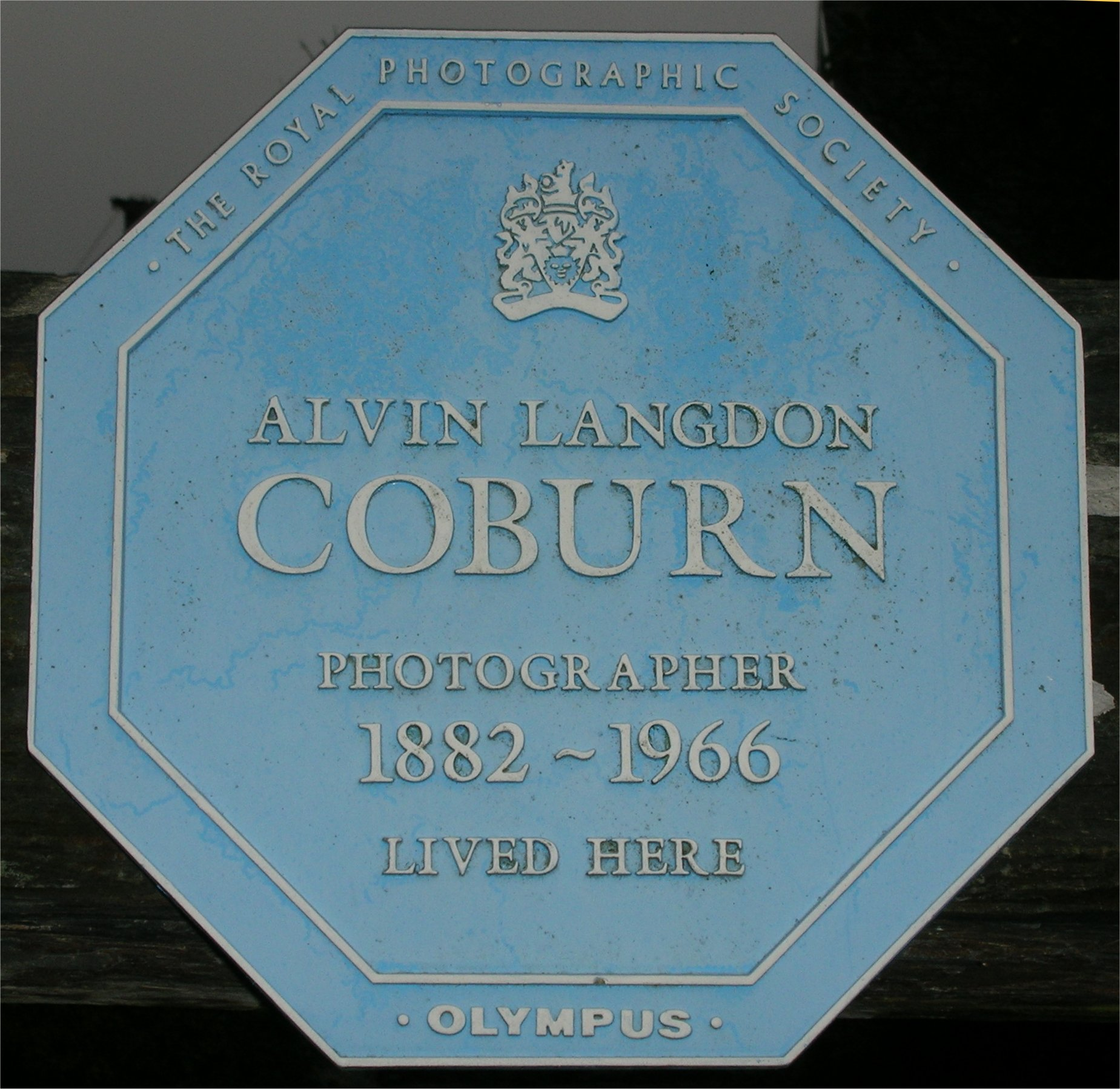
Blue plaque on his home in Harlech, North Wales

By 1930 Coburn had lost almost all interest in photography. He decided that his past was of little use to him now, and over the summer he destroyed nearly 15,000 glass and film negatives – nearly his entire life's output. This same year he donated his extensive collection of contemporary and historical photographs to the Royal Photographic Society.

A year later he wrote his last letter to Stieglitz, and from then on he made only a few new photographs. Ironically, just when he was making an almost complete break from photography Coburn was elected Honorary Fellow of the Royal Photographic Society. After living in England for more than 20 years, Coburn finally became a British subject in 1932.

In 1945, he moved from his house in Harlech, North Wales to Rhos-on-Sea, Colwyn Bay, on the north coast of Wales. He lived there the rest of his life. His wife Edith died on October 11, 1957, their 45th wedding anniversary. Alvin Coburn died in his home in North Wales on November 23, 1966, aged 84, in Rhos-on-Sea.

== Gallery ==
George Meredith (1911)

Study - Miss R (1904)

House of a Thousand Windows (1912)
