= Pictorialism =

Photography movement

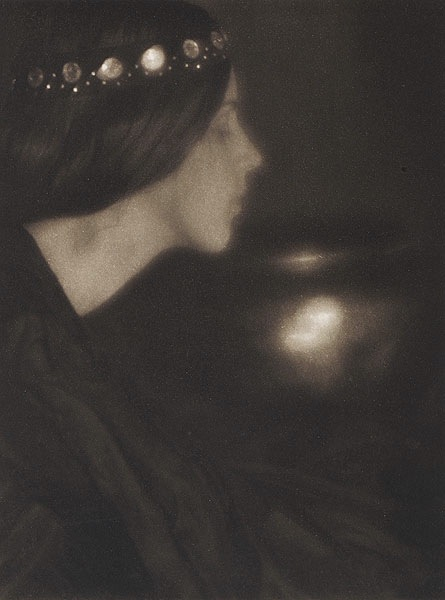
- "The Black Bowl", by George Seeley, circa 1907. Published in Camera Work, No 20 (1907)
- Years active: 1850s to 1940s

Pictorialism is an international style and aesthetic movement that dominated photography during the later 19th and early 20th centuries. There is no standard definition of the term, but in general it refers to a style in which the photographer has somehow manipulated what would otherwise be a straightforward photograph as a means of creating an image rather than simply recording it. Typically, a pictorial photograph appears to lack a sharp focus (some more so than others), is printed in one or more colors other than black-and-white (ranging from warm brown to deep blue) and may have visible brush strokes or other manipulation of the surface. For the pictorialist, a photograph, like a painting, drawing or engraving, was a way of projecting an emotional intent into the viewer's realm of imagination.

Pictorialism as a movement thrived from about 1885 to 1915, although it was still being promoted by some as late as the 1940s. It began in response to claims that a photograph was nothing more than a simple record of reality, and transformed into a movement to advance the status of all photography as a true art form. For more than three decades painters, photographers and art critics debated opposing artistic philosophies, ultimately culminating in the acquisition of photographs by several major art museums.

Pictorialism gradually declined in popularity after 1920, although it did not fade out of popularity until the end of World War II. During this period the new style of photographic Modernism came into vogue, and the public's interest shifted to more sharply focused images such as seen in the work of Ansel Adams. Several important 20th-century photographers began their careers in a pictorialist style but transitioned into sharply focused photography by the 1930s.

== Overview ==
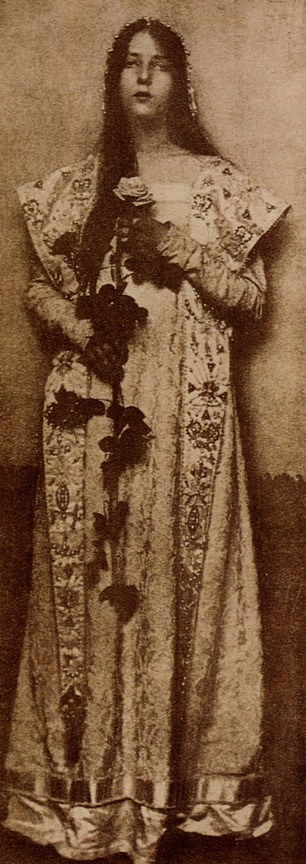
"The Rose", by Eva Watson-Schütze, 1905

Photography as a technical process involving the development of film and prints in a darkroom originated in the early 19th century, with the forerunners of traditional photographic prints coming into prominence around 1838 to 1840. Not long after the new medium was established, photographers, painters and others began to argue about the relationship between the scientific and artistic aspects of the medium. As early as 1853, English painter William John Newton proposed that the camera could produce artistic results if the photographer would keep an image slightly out of focus. Others vehemently believed that a photograph was equivalent to the visual record of a chemistry experiment. Photography historian Naomi Rosenblum points out that "the dual character of the medium—its capacity to produce both art and document—[was] demonstrated soon after its discovery ... Nevertheless, a good part of the nineteenth century was spent debating which of these directions was the medium's true function."

These debates reached their peak during the late nineteenth and early twentieth centuries, culminating in the creation of a movement that is usually characterized as a particular style of photography: pictorialism. This style is defined first by a distinctly personal expression that emphasizes photography's ability to create visual beauty rather than simply record facts. However, recently historians have recognized that pictorialism is more than just a visual style. It evolved in direct context with the changing social and cultural attitudes of the time, and, as such, it should not be characterized simply as a visual trend. One writer has noted that pictorialism was "simultaneously a movement, a philosophy, an aesthetic and a style."

Contrary to what some histories of photography portray, pictorialism did not come about as the result of a linear evolution of artistic sensibilities; rather, it was formed through "an intricate, divergent, often passionately conflicting barrage of strategies." While photographers and others debated whether photography could be art, the advent of photography directly affected the roles and livelihoods of many traditional artists. Prior to the development of photography, a painted miniature portrait was the most common means of recording a person's likeness. Thousands of painters were engaged in this art form. But photography quickly negated the need for and interest in miniature portraits. One example of this effect was seen at the annual exhibition of the Royal Academy in London; in 1830 more than 300 miniature paintings were exhibited, but by 1870 only 33 were on display. Photography had taken over for one type of art form, but the question of whether photography itself could be artistic had not been resolved.

Some painters soon adopted photography as a tool to help them record a model's pose, a landscape scene or other elements to include in their art. It is known that many of the great 19th-century painters, including Delacroix, Courbet, Manet, Degas, Cézanne, and Gauguin, took photographs themselves, used photographs by others and incorporated images from photographs into their work. While heated debates about the relationship between photography and art continued in print and in lecture halls, the distinction between a photographic image and a painting became more and more difficult to discern. As photography continued to develop, the interactions between painting and photography became increasingly reciprocal. More than a few pictorial photographers, including Alvin Langdon Coburn, Edward Steichen, Gertrude Käsebier, Oscar Gustave Rejlander, and Sarah Choate Sears, were originally trained as painters or took up painting in addition to their photographic skills.

It was during this same period that cultures and societies around the world were being affected by a rapid increase in intercontinental travel and commerce. Books and magazines published on one continent could be exported and sold on another with increasing ease, and the development of reliable mail services facilitated individual exchanges of ideas, techniques and, most importantly for photography, actual prints. These developments led to pictorialism being "a more international movement in photography than almost any other photographic genre." Camera clubs in the U.S., England, France, Germany, Austria, Japan and other countries regularly lent works to each other's exhibitions, exchanged technical information and published essays and critical commentaries in one another's journals. Led by The Linked Ring in England, the Photo-Secession in the U.S., and the Photo-club de Paris in France, first hundreds and then thousands of photographers passionately pursued common interests in this multi-dimensional movement. Within the span of little more than a decade, notable pictorial photographers were found in Western and Eastern Europe, North America, Asia and Australia.

== Impact of Kodak cameras ==
For the first forty years after a practical process of capturing and reproducing images was invented, photography required expert knowledge of and skills in science, mechanics and art. To make a photograph, a person had to learn a great deal about chemistry, optics, light, the mechanics of cameras and how these factors combine to properly render a scene. It was not something that one learned easily or engaged in lightly, and, as such, it was limited to a relatively small group of academics, scientists and professional photographers.

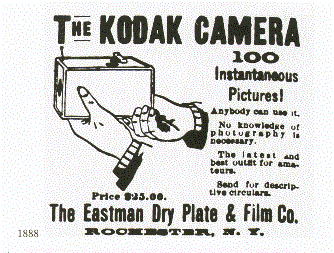
Ad for a Kodak camera, 1888 – "No knowledge of photography is necessary."

All of that changed in a few years' time span. In 1888 George Eastman introduced the first handheld amateur camera, the Kodak camera. It was marketed with the slogan "You press the button, we do the rest." The camera was pre-loaded with a roll of film that produced about 100 2.5" round picture exposures, and it could easily be carried and handheld during its operation. After all of the shots on the film were exposed, the whole camera was returned to the Kodak company in Rochester, New York, where the film was developed, prints were made, and new photographic film was placed inside. Then the camera and prints were returned to the customer, who was ready to take more pictures.

The impact of this change was enormous. Suddenly almost anyone could take a photograph, and within the span of a few years photography became one of the biggest fads in the world. Photography collector Michael G. Wilson observed "Thousands of commercial photographers and a hundred times as many amateurs were producing millions of photographs annually ... The decline in the quality of professional work and the deluge of snapshots (a term borrowed from hunting, meaning to get off a quick shot without taking the time to aim) resulted in a world awash with technically good but aesthetically indifferent photographs."

Concurrent with this change was the development of national and international commercial enterprises to meet the new demand for cameras, films and prints. At the 1893 World Columbian Exposition in Chicago, which attracted more than 27 million people, photography for amateurs was marketed at an unprecedented scale. There were multiple large exhibits displaying photographs from around the world, many camera and darkroom equipment manufacturers showing and selling their latest goods, dozens of portrait studios and even on-the-spot documentation of the Exposition itself. Suddenly photography and photographers were household commodities.

Many serious photographers were appalled. Their craft, and to some their art, was being co-opted by a newly engaged, uncontrolled and mostly untalented citizenry. The debate about art and photography intensified around the argument that if anyone could take a photograph then photography could not possibly be called art. Some of the most passionate defenders of photography as art pointed out that photography should not and cannot be seen as an "either/or" medium—some photographs are indeed simple records of reality, but with the right elements some are indeed works of art. William Howe Downs, art critic for the Boston Evening Transcript, summed up this position in 1900 by saying "Art is not so much a matter of methods and processes as it is an affair of temperament, of taste and of sentiment ... In the hands of the artist, the photograph becomes a work of art ... In a word, photography is what the photographer makes it ‒ an art or a trade."

All of these elements—the debates over photography and art, the impacts of Kodak cameras, and the changing social and cultural values of the times—combined to set the stage for an evolution in how art and photography, independently and together, would appear at the turn of the century. The course that drove pictorialism was set almost as soon as photographic processes were established, but it was not until the last decade of the 19th century that an international pictorialist movement came together.

== Defining pictorialism ==
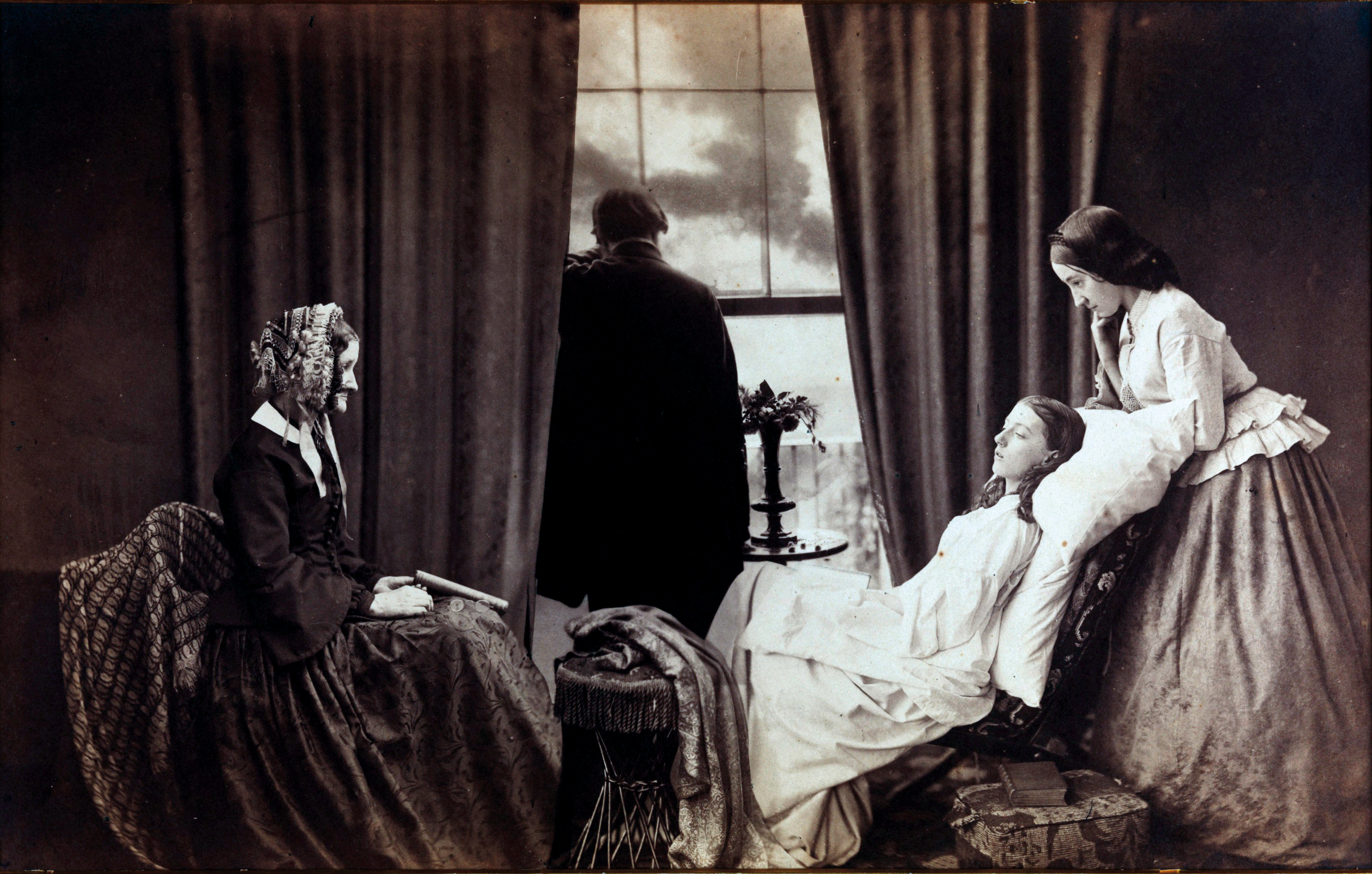
"Fading Away", by Henry Peach Robinson, 1858

In 1869 English photographer Henry Peach Robinson published a book entitled Pictorial Effect in Photography: Being Hints on Composition and Chiaroscuro for Photographers. This is the first common use of the term "pictorial" referring to photography in the context of a certain stylistic element, chiaroscuro ‒ an Italian term used by painters and art historians that refers to the use of dramatic lighting and shading to convey an expressive mood. In his book Robinson promoted what he called "combination printing", a method he had devised nearly 20 years earlier by combining individual elements from separate images into a new single image by manipulating multiple negatives or prints. Robinson thus considered that he had created "art" through photography, since it was only through his direct intervention that the final image came about. Robinson continued to expand on the meaning of the term throughout his life.

Other photographers and art critics, including Oscar Rejlander, Marcus Aurelius Root, and John Ruskin, echoed these ideas. One of the primary forces behind the rise of pictorialism was the belief that straight photography was purely representational ‒ that it showed reality without the filter of artistic interpretation. It was, for all intents and purposes, a simple record of the visual facts, lacking artistic intent or merit. Robinson and others felt strongly that the "usually accepted limitations of photography had to be overcome if an equality of status was to be achieved."

Robert Demachy later summarized this concept in an article entitled "What Difference Is There Between a Good Photograph and an Artistic Photograph?". He wrote "We must realize that, on undertaking pictorial photography, we have, unwittingly perhaps, bound ourselves to the strict observance of rules hundreds of years more ancient than the oldest formulae of our chemical craft. We have slipped into the Temple of Art by a back door, and found ourselves amongst the crowd of adepts."

One of the challenges in promoting photography as art was that there were many different opinions about how art should look. After the Third Philadelphia Salon 1900, which showcased dozens of pictorial photographers, one critic wondered "whether the idea of art in anything like the true sense had ever been heard or thought by the great majority of exhibitors."

While some photographers saw themselves becoming true artists by emulating painting, at least one school of painting directly inspired photographers. During the 1880s, when debates over art and photography were becoming commonplace, a style of painting known as Tonalism first appeared. Within a few years it became a significant artistic influence on the development of pictorialism. Painters such as James McNeill Whistler, George Inness, Ralph Albert Blakelock, and Arnold Böcklin saw the interpretation of the experience of nature, as contrasted with simply recording an image of nature, as the artist's highest duty. To these artists it was essential that their paintings convey an emotional response to the viewer, which was elicited through an emphasis on the atmospheric elements in the picture and by the use of "vague shapes and subdued tonalities ... [to convey] a sense of elegiac melancholy."

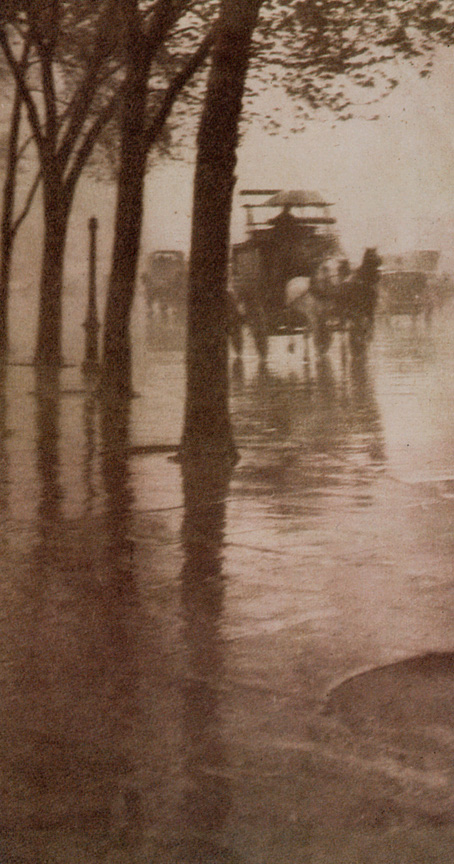
"Spring Showers, the Coach", by Alfred Stieglitz, 1899–1900

Applying this same sensibility to photography, Alfred Stieglitz later stated it this way: "Atmosphere is the medium through which we see all things. In order, therefore, to see them in their true value on a photograph, as we do in Nature, atmosphere must be there. Atmosphere softens all lines; it graduates the transition from light to shade; it is essential to the reproduction of the sense of distance. That dimness of outline which is characteristic for distant objects is due to atmosphere. Now, what atmosphere is to Nature, tone is to a picture."

Paul Lewis Anderson, a prolific contemporary promoter of pictorialism, advised his readers that true art photography conveyed "suggestion and mystery", in which "mystery consists in affording an opportunity for the exercise of the imagination, whereas suggestion involves stimulating the imagination by direct or indirect means." Science, pictorialists contended, might answer a demand for truthful information, but art must respond to the human need for stimulation of the senses. This could only be done by creating a mark of individuality for each image and, ideally, each print.

For pictorialists, true individuality was expressed through the creation of a unique print, considered by many to be the epitome of artistic photography. By manipulating the appearance of images through what some called "ennobling processes", such as gum or bromoil printing, pictorialists were able to create unique photographs that were sometimes mistaken for drawings or lithographs.

Many of the strongest voices that championed pictorialism at its beginning were a new generation of amateur photographers. In contrast to its meaning today, the word "amateur" held a different connotation in the discussions of that time. Rather than suggesting an inexperienced novice, the word characterized someone who strived for artistic excellence and a freedom from rigid academic influence. An amateur was seen as someone who could break the rules because he or she was not bound by the then rigid rules set forth by long-established photography organizations like the Royal Photographic Society. An article in the British journal Amateur Photographer stated "photography is an art ‒ perhaps the only one in which the amateur soon equals, and frequently excels, the professional in proficiency." This attitude prevailed in many countries around the world. At the 1893 Hamburg International Photographic Exhibition in Germany, only the work of amateurs was allowed. Alfred Lichtwark, then director of the Kunsthalle Hamburg believed "the only good portraiture in any medium was being done by amateurs photographers, who had the economic freedom and time to experiment."

In 1948, S.D.Jouhar defined a Pictorial photograph as "mainly an aesthetic symbolic record of a scene plus the artist's personal comment and interpretation, capable of transmitting an emotional response to the mind of a receptive spectator. It should show originality, imagination, unity of purpose, a quality of repose, and have an infinite quality about it."

== Gallery ==
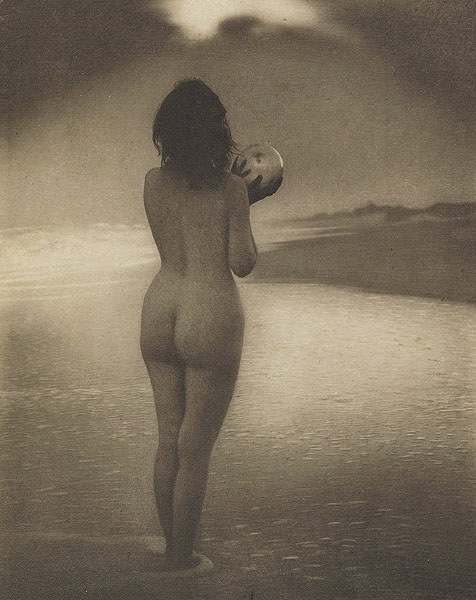
Alice Boughton, Dawn, 1909

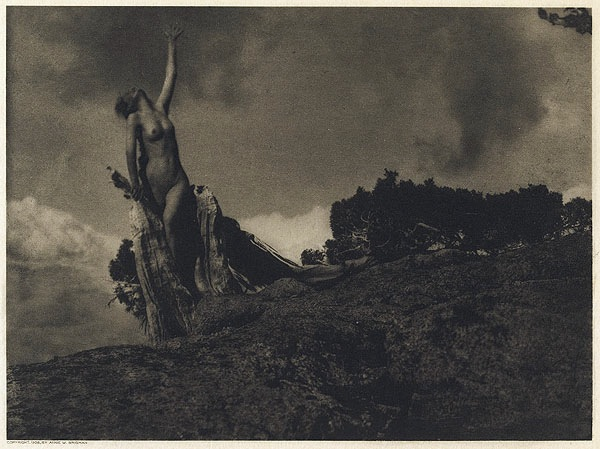
Anne Brigman, Soul of the Blasted Pine, 1908

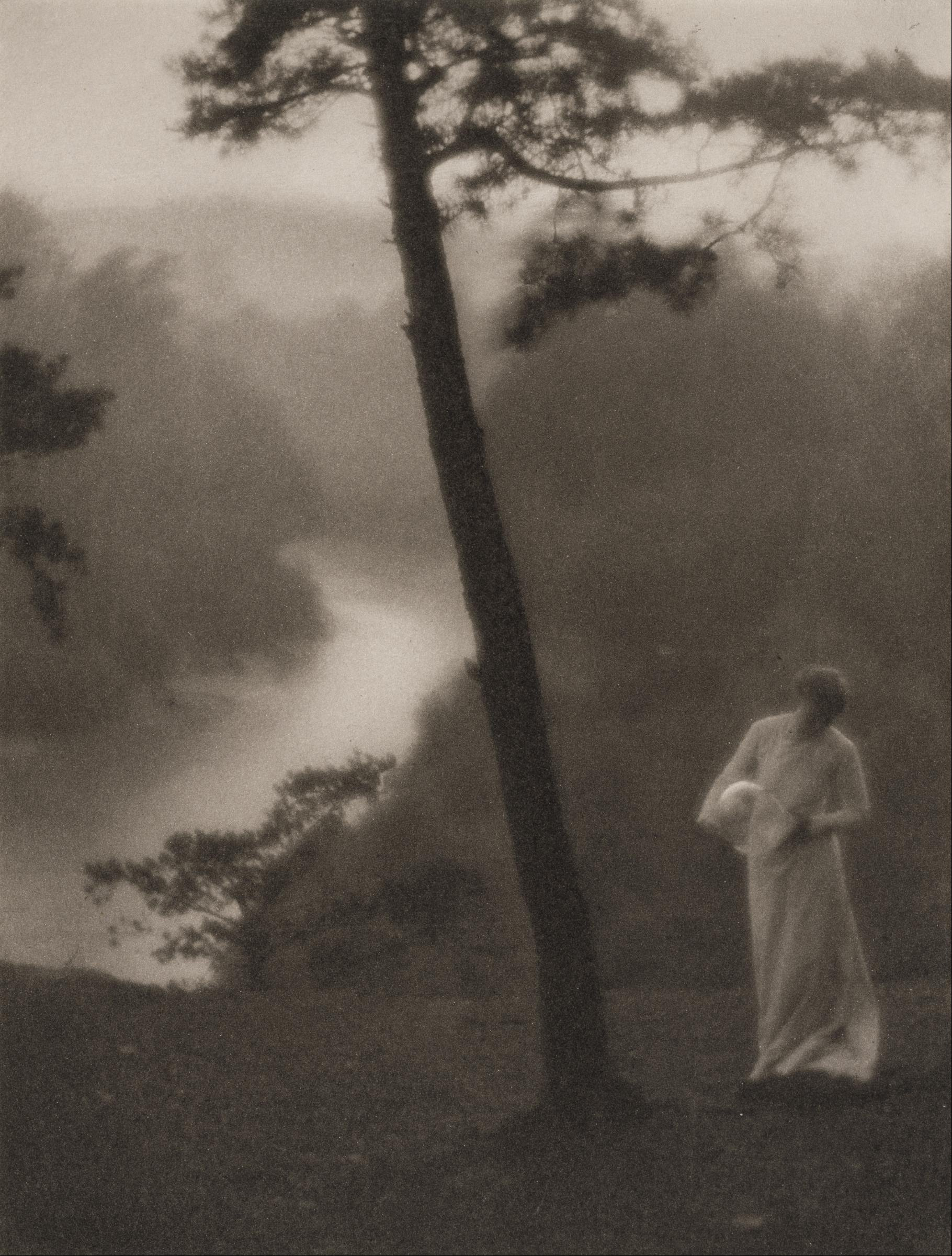
Clarence H. White, Morning, 1908

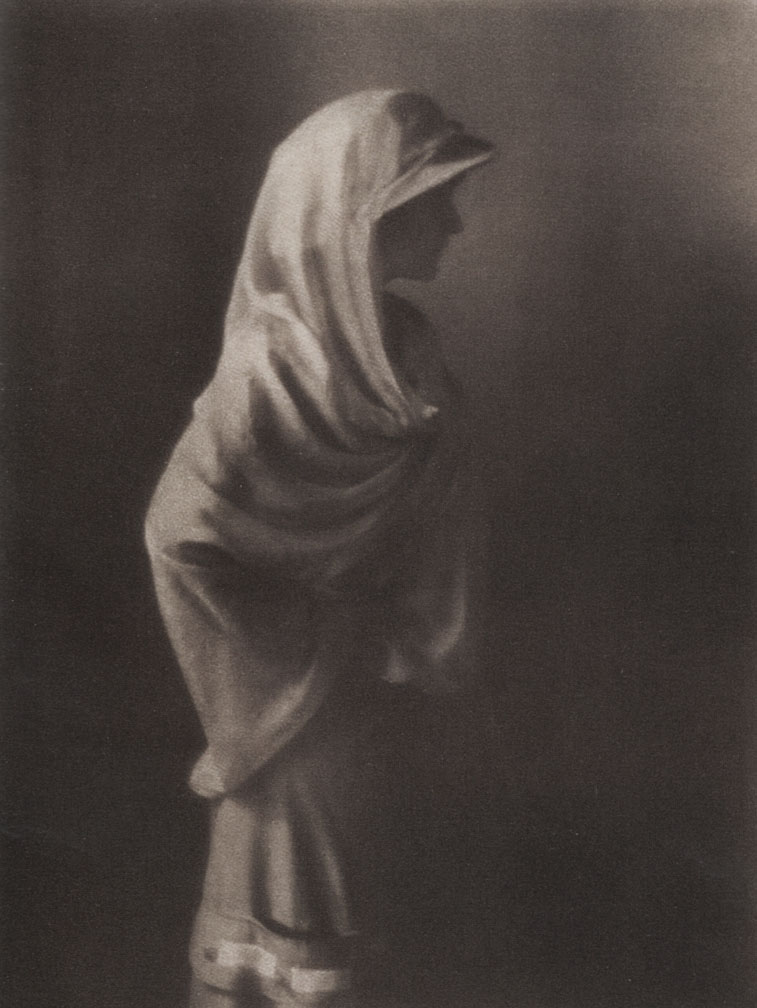
Paul Haviland, Doris Keane, 1912

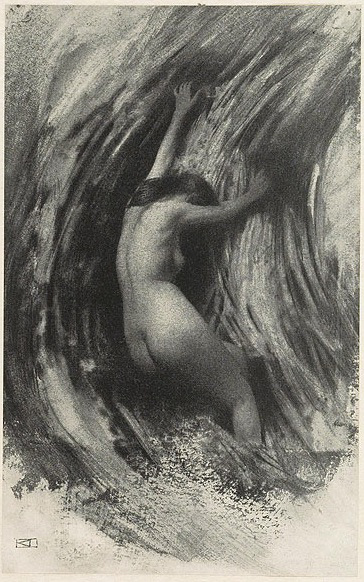
Robert Demachy, Struggle, 1904

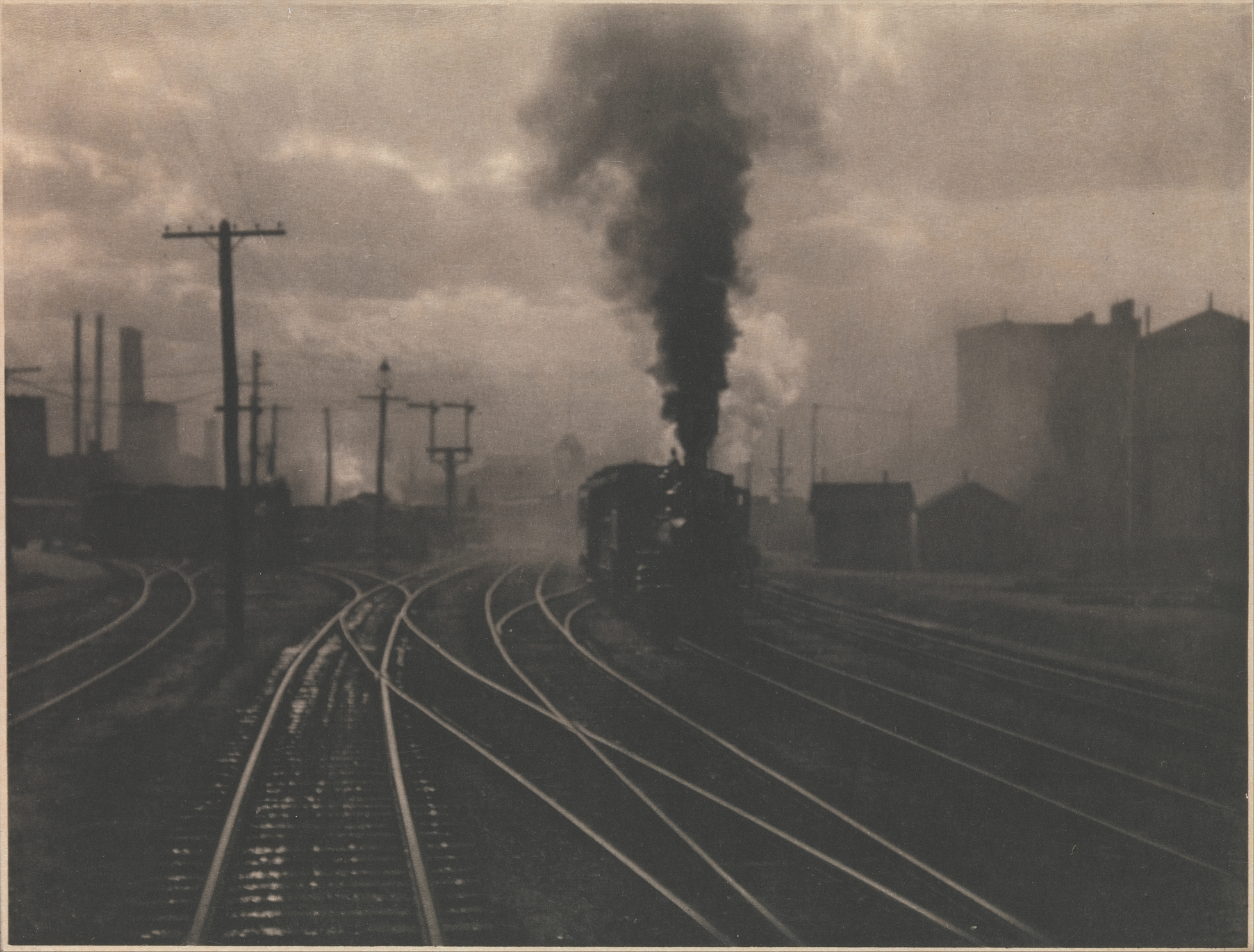
Alfred Stieglitz, The Hand of Man, 1902

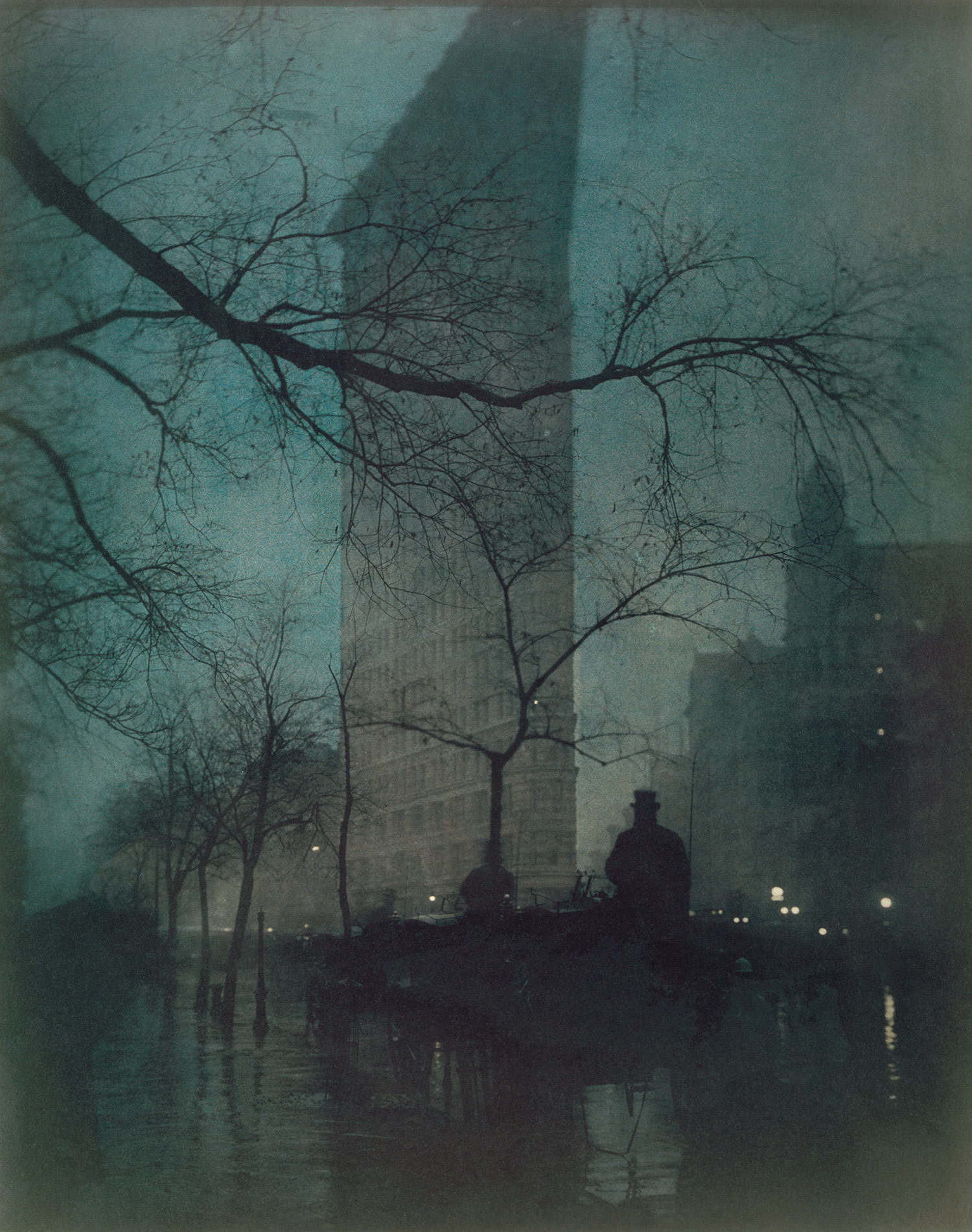
Edward Steichen, Flatiron Building, 1904

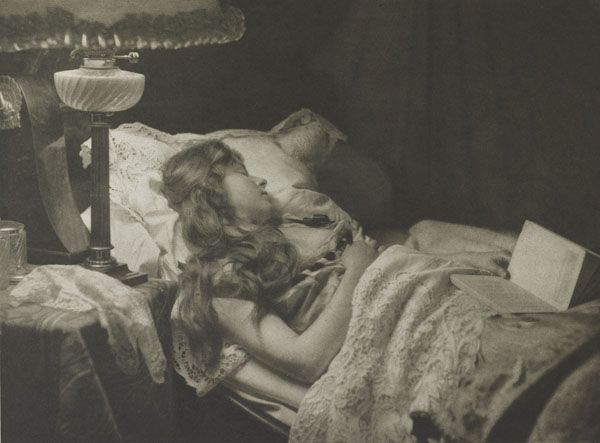
Constant Puyo, Sommeil, 1897

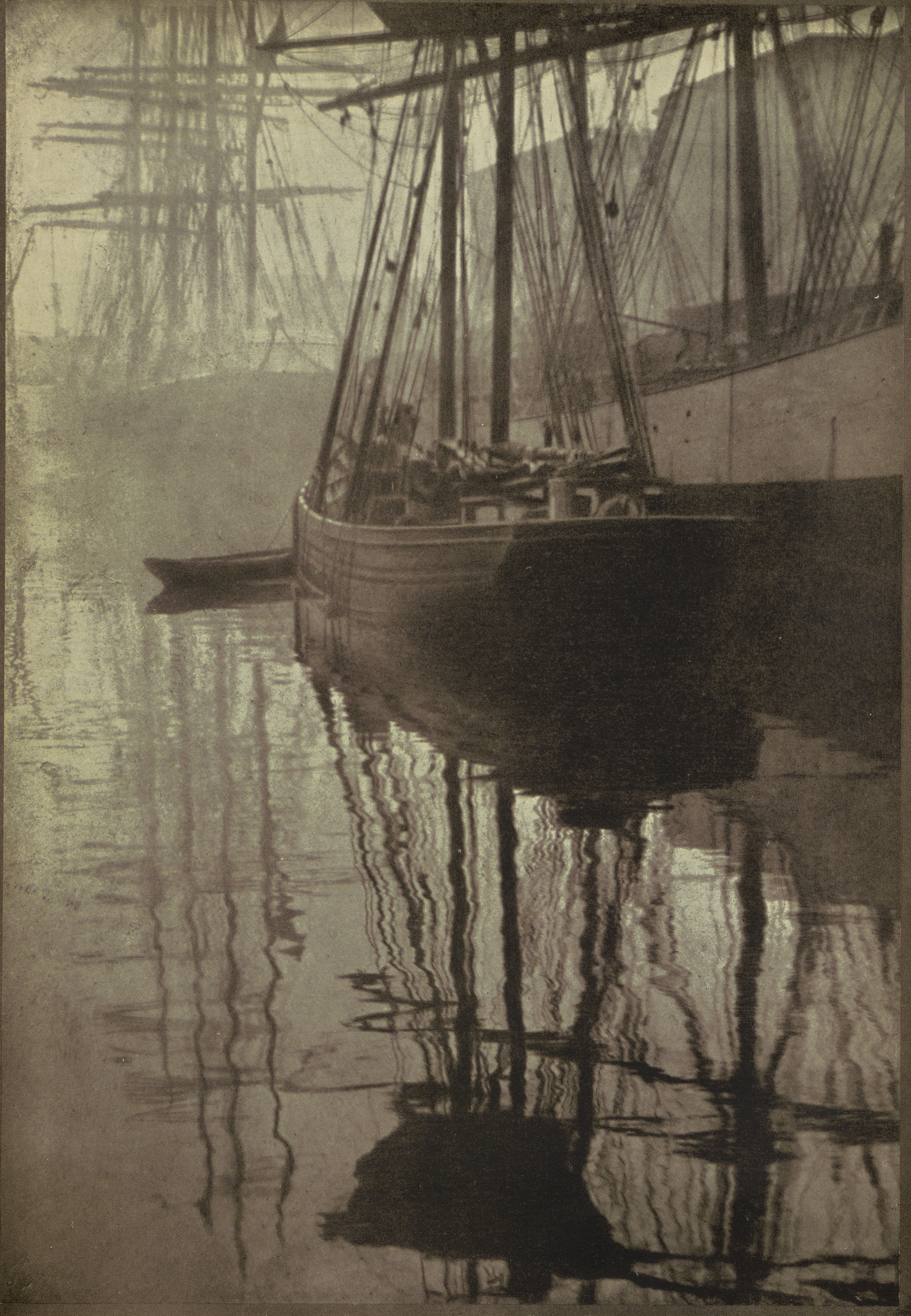
Alvin Langdon Coburn, Spiderwebs, 1908

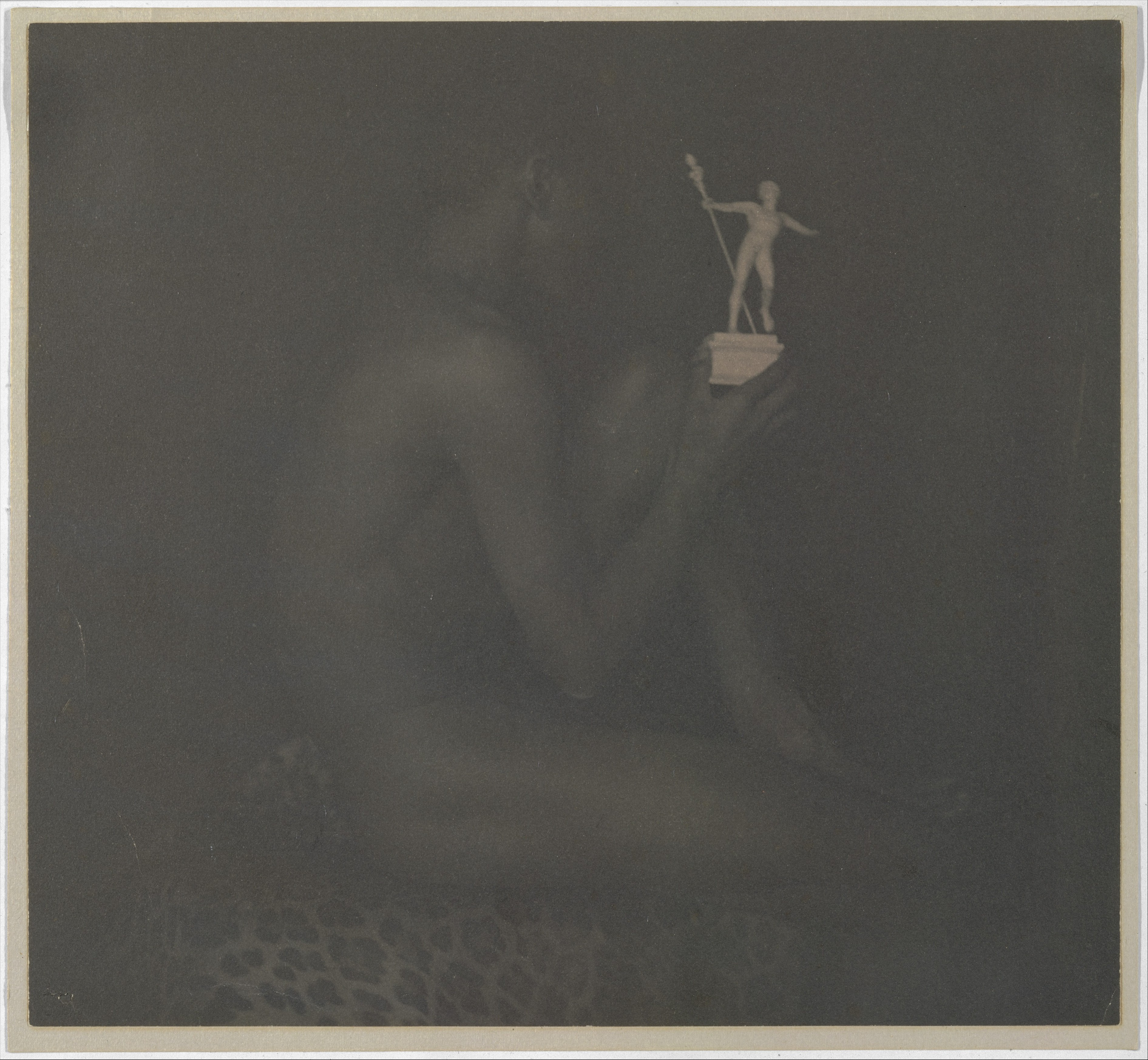
F. Holland Day, Ebony and Ivory, ca.1897

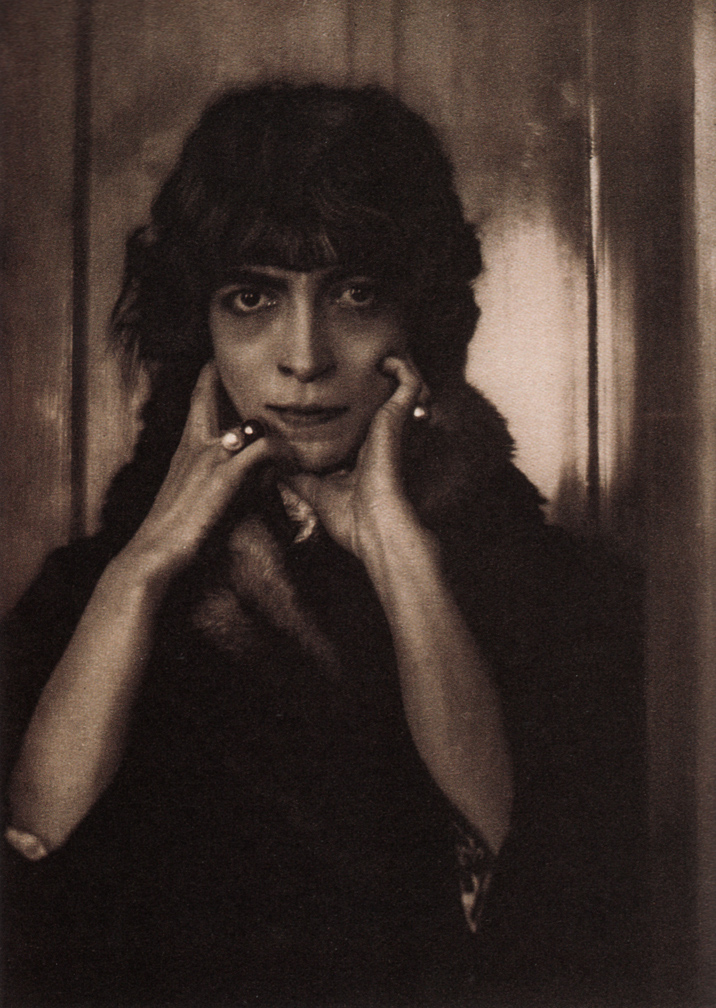
Adolph de Meyer, "Marchesa Casati", 1912

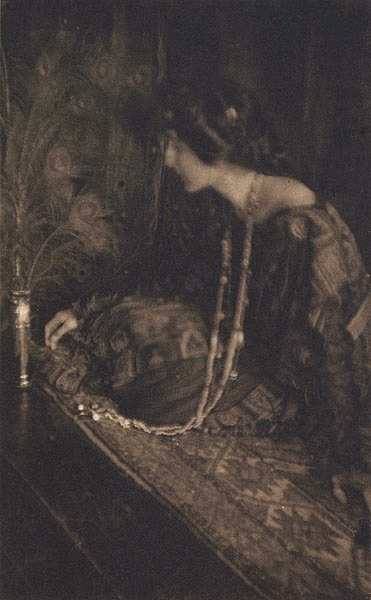
Joseph Keiley, Lenore, 1907

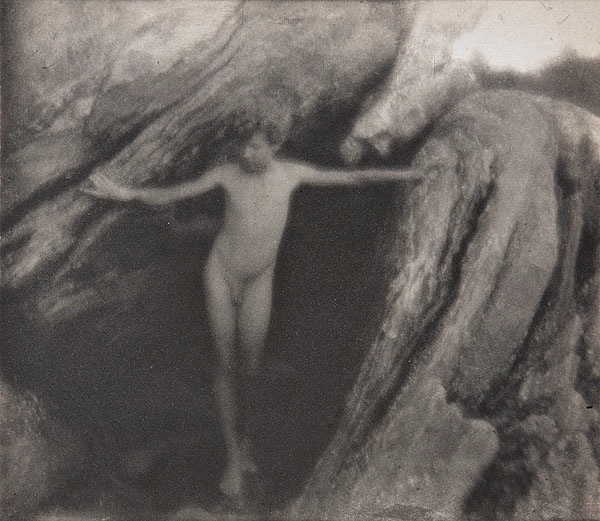
Clarence H. White, Nude, 1908

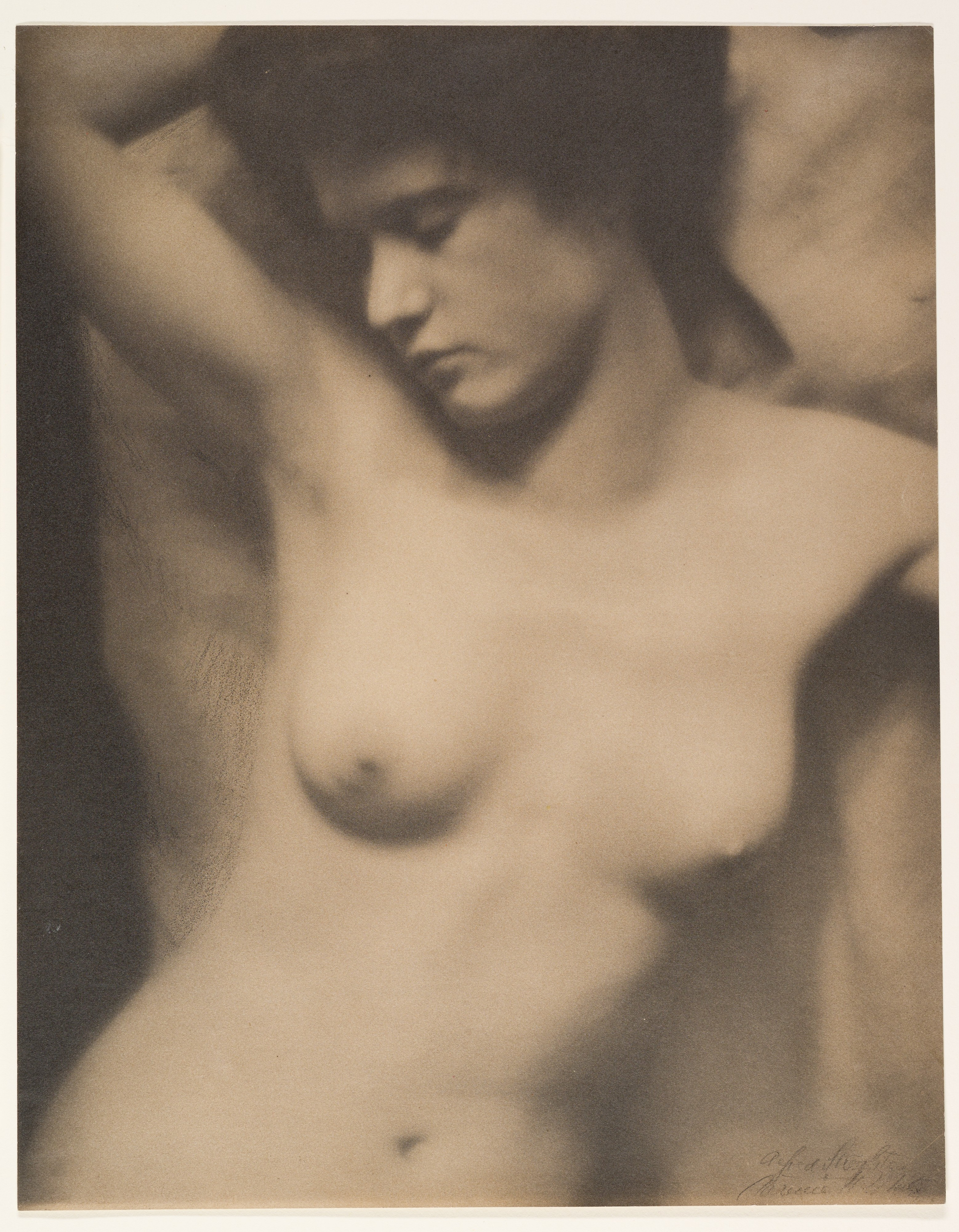
Clarence H. White and Alfred Stieglitz, Torso, 1907

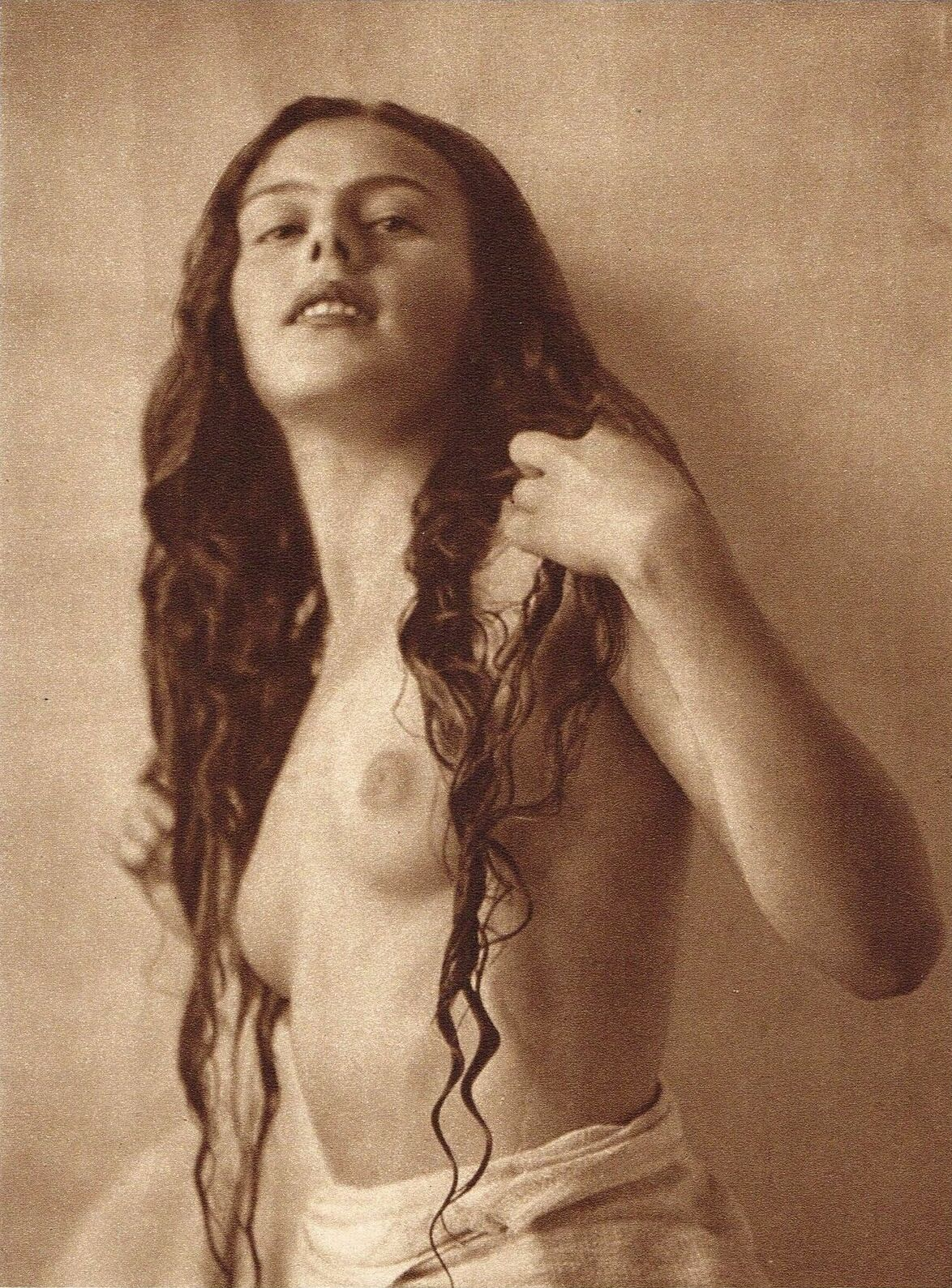
Henry Buergel Goodwin, Efter badet, 1921

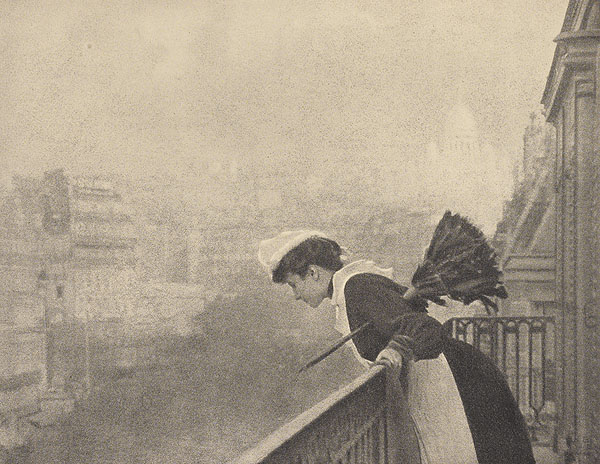
Constant Puyo, Montmartre, 1906

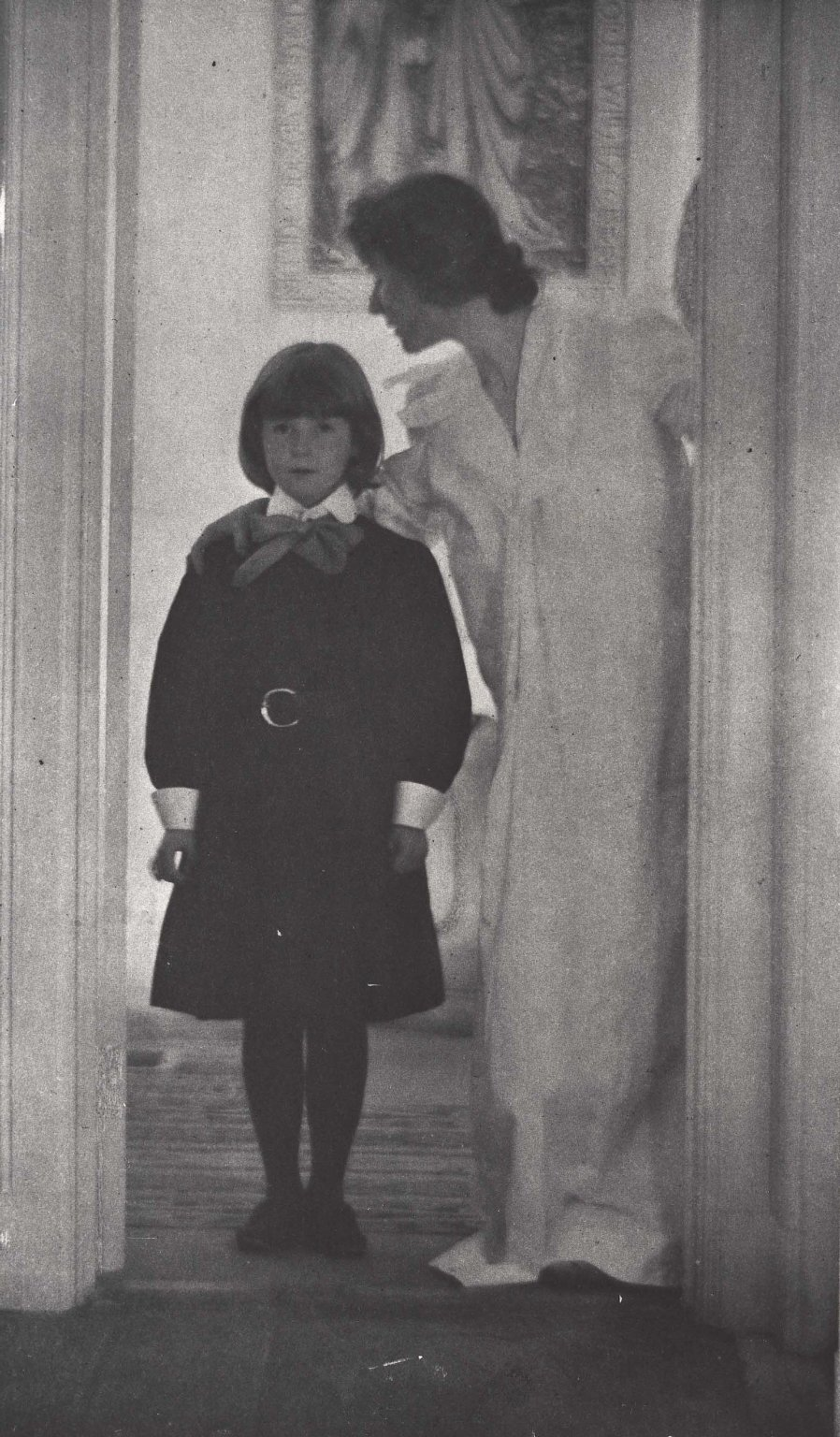
Gertrude Käsebier, Blessed Art Thou Among Women, 1899. Brooklyn Museum

== Transition into Modernism ==
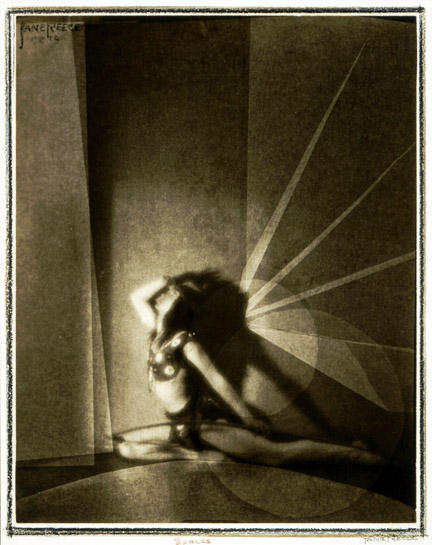
Jane Reece, Spaces, 1922

The evolution of pictorialism from the 19th century well into the 1940s was both slow and determined. From its roots in Europe it spread to the U.S. and the rest of the world in several semi-distinct stages. Prior to 1890 pictorialism emerged through advocates who were mainly in England, Germany, Austria and France. During the 1890s the center shifted to New York and Stieglitz's multi-faceted efforts. By 1900 pictorialism had reached countries around the world, and major exhibitions of pictorial photography were held in dozens of cities.

A culminating moment for pictorialism and for photography in general occurred in 1910, when the Albright Gallery in Buffalo bought 15 photographs from Stieglitz' 291 Gallery. This was the first time photography was officially recognized as an art form worthy of a museum collection, and it signaled a definite shift in many photographers' thinking. Stieglitz, who had worked so long for this moment, responded by indicating he was already thinking of a new vision beyond pictorialism. He wrote,

It is high time that the stupidity and sham in pictorial photography be struck a solarplexus blow ... Claims of art won't do. Let the photographer make a perfect photograph. And if he happens to be a lover of perfection and a seer, the resulting photograph will be straight and beautiful – a true photograph.

Soon after Stieglitz began to direct his attention more to modern painting and sculpture, and Clarence H. White and others took over the leadership of a new generation of photographers. As the harsh realities of World War I affected people around the world, the public's taste for the art of the past began to change. Developed countries of the world focused more and more on industry and growth, and art reflected this change by featuring hard-edged images of new buildings, airplanes and industrial landscapes.

Adolf Fassbender, a 20th-century photographer who continued to make pictorial photographs well into the 1960s, believed that pictorialism is eternal because it is based upon beauty first. He wrote "There is no solution in trying to eradicate pictorialism for one would then have to destroy idealism, sentiment and all sense of art and beauty. There will always be pictorialism."

== Pictorialism by country ==
=== Australia ===
One of the primary catalysts of pictorialism in Australia was John Kauffmann (1864–1942), who studied photographic chemistry and printing in London, Zurich and Vienna between 1889 and 1897. When he returned to his home country in 1897, he greatly influenced his colleagues by exhibiting what one newspaper called photographs that could be "mistaken for works of art." Over the next decade a core of photographer artists, including Harold Cazneaux, Frank Hurley, Cecil Bostock, Henri Mallard, Rose Simmonds, and Olive Cotton, exhibited pictorial works at salons and exhibitions across the country and published their photos in the Australian Photographic Journal and the Australasian Photo-Review.

=== Austria ===
In 1891 the Club der Amateur Photographen in Wien (Vienna Amateur Photographers' Club) held the first International Exhibition of Photography in Vienna. The club, founded by Carl Sma, Federico Mallmann and Charles Scolik, was founded to foster relationships with photographic groups in other countries. After Alfred Buschbeck became head of the club in 1893, it simplified its name to Wiener Camera-Klub (Vienna Camera Club) and began publishing a lavish magazine called Wiener Photographische Blätter that continued until 1898. It regularly featured articles from influential foreign photographers such as Alfred Stieglitz and Robert Demachy.

As in other countries, opposing viewpoints engaged a wider range of photographers in defining what pictorialism meant. Hans Watzek, Hugo Henneberg and Heinrich Kühn formed an organization called Das Kleeblatt (The Trilfolium) expressly to increase the exchange of information with other organizations in other countries, especially, France, Germany and the United States. Initially a small, informal group, Das Kleeblatt increased it influence in the Wiener Camera-Klub through its international connections, and several other organizations promoting pictorialism were created in other cities throughout the region. As in other countries, interest in pictorialism faded after World War I, and eventually most of the Austrian organization slipped into obscurity during the 1920s.

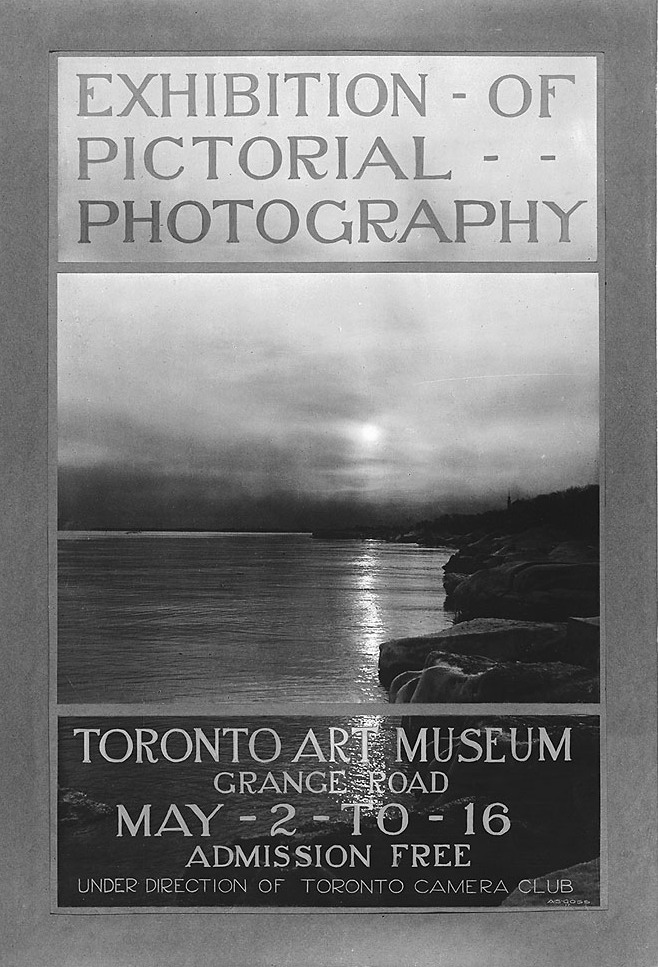
1917 exhibition poster

=== Canada ===
Pictorialism was the first distinct photographic movement in Canada. Sidney Carter (1880–1956) was one of its first practitioners, and he was also the first Canadian to be elected to Stieglitz's Photo-Secession group in New York. This inspired Carter to bring an exhibition of pictorial photography to Toronto in 1906, with the help of Harold Mortimer-Lamb (1872–1970) and fellow Secessionist Percy Hodgins. In 1907, Carter organized Canada's first major exhibition of pictorial photography at Montreal's Art Association. Carter and fellow photographer Arthur Goss attempted to introduce pictorialist principles to the members of the Toronto Camera Club, although their efforts were met with some resistance. Minna Keene (1861–1943) was a celebrated Pictorialist who had already established her presence in the movement by the time she moved from the U.K. to Canada in 1913. In the late 1910s and early 1920s, Margaret Watkins (1884–1969) produced still-life photographs that have become some of the most internationally recognized modernist images. Pictorialism in Canada continued well into the 20th century. For example, H.G. Cox (1885–1972), a B.C. photographer, didn't begin his Pictorialist practice until the 1920s. Similarly, Vancouver photographer John Vanderpant (1884–1939) had already begun a practice of modernist photography, yet still integrated Pictorialism into his photographs.

=== England ===
As early as 1853 amateur photographer William J. Newton proposed the idea that "a 'natural object', such as a tree, should be photographed in accordance 'the acknowledged principles of fine art'". From there other early photographers, including Henry Peach Robinson and Peter Henry Emerson, continued to promote the concept of photography as art. In 1892 Robinson, along with George Davison and Alfred Maskell, established the first organization devoted specifically to the ideal of photography as art – The Linked Ring. They invited like-minded photographers, including Frank Sutcliffe, Frederick H. Evans, Alvin Langdon Coburn, Frederick Hollyer, James Craig Annan, Alfred Horsley Hinton and others, to join them. Soon The Linked Ring was at the forefront of the movement to have photography regarded as an art form.

After The Linked Ring invited a select group of Americans as members, debates broke out about the goals and purpose of the club. When more American than British members were shown at their annual exhibit in 1908, a motion was introduced to disband the organization. By 1910 The Linked Ring has dissolved, and its members went their own way.

=== France ===
Pictorialism in France is dominated by two names, Constant Puyo and Robert Demachy. They were the most famous members of the Photo-Club de Paris, a separate organization from the Société française de photographie. They are particularly well known for their use of pigment processes, especially gum bichromate. In 1906, they published a book on the subject, Les Procédés d'art en Photographie. Both of them also wrote many articles for the Bulletin du Photo-Club de Paris (1891–1902) and La Revue de Photographie (1903–1908), a magazine which quickly became the most influential French publication dealing with artistic photography during the early 20th century. Céline Laguarde was the leading woman photographer in the field and her work was published alongside Puyo and Demachy.

=== Germany ===
The Hofmeister brothers, Theodor and Oskar, of Hamburg were among the first to advocate for photography as art in their country. At meetings of the Society for the Promotion of Amateur Photography (Gesellschaft zur Förderung der Amateur-Photographie), other photographers, including Heinrich Beck, Georg Einbeck, and Otto Scharf, advanced the cause of pictorialism. The Homeisters, along with Heinrich Kühn, later formed The Presidium (Das Praesidium), whose members were instrumental in major exhibitions at the Kunsthalle in Hamburg. Nowadays Karl Maria Udo Remmes represents the style of pictorialism in the field of theatrical backstage photography.

=== Japan ===
In 1889 photographers Ogawa Kazumasa, W. K. Burton, Kajima Seibei and several others formed the Nihon Shashin-kai (Japan Photographic Society) in order to promote geijutsu shashin (art photography) in that country. Acceptance of this new style was slow at first, but in 1893 Burton coordinated a major invitational exhibition known as Gaikoku Shashin-ga Tenrain-kai or the Foreign Photographic Art Exhibition. The 296 works that were shown came from members of the London Camera Club, including important photographs by Peter Henry Emerson and George Davison. The breadth and depth of this exhibition had a tremendous impact on Japanese photographers, and it "galvanized the discourse of art photography throughout the country." After the exhibition ended Burton and Kajima founded a new organization, the Dai Nihon Shashin Hinpyō-kai (Greater Japan Photography Critique Society) to advance their particular viewpoints on art photography.

In 1904 a new magazine called Shashin Geppo (Monthly Photo Journal) was started, and for many years it was the centerpiece for the advancement of and debates about pictorialism. The meaning and direction of art photography as championed by Ogawa and others was challenged in the new journal by photographers Tarō Saitō and Haruki Egashira, who, along with Tetsusuke Akiyama and Seiichi Katō, formed a new group known as Yūtsuzu-sha. This new group promoted their own concepts of what they called "the inner truth" of art photography. For the next decade many photographers aligned themselves with one of these two organizations. Outside Tokyo, local "art photography" (geijutsu shashin) clubs also emerged; for example, the Nagoya-based Aiyu Photography Club was founded in 1912.

In the 1920s new organizations were formed that bridged the transition between pictorialism and modernism. By about 1930, Japanese modernist photographers associated with shinkō shashin ("New Photography") emphasized photography-specific creative expression and were positioned in sharp contrast to pictorialism, which had been the leading form of art photography in Japan. Most prominently among these was the Shashin Geijustu-sha (Photographic Art Society) formed by Shinzō Fukuhara and his brother Rosō Fukuhara. They promoted the concept of hikari to sono kaichō (light with its harmony) that rejected an overt manipulation of an image in favor of soft-focused images using silver gelatin printing.

=== Netherlands ===
The first generation of Dutch pictorialists, including Bram Loman, Chris Schuver, and Carl Emile Mögle, began working around 1890. They initially focused on naturalistic themes and favored platinum printing. Although initially there was no Dutch equivalent of The Linked Ring or Photo-Secession, several smaller organizations collaborated to produce the First International Salon for Art Photography in 1904. Three years later Adriann Boer, Ernest Loeb, Johan Huijsen, and others founded the Dutch Club for Art Photography (Nederlandsche Club voor Foto-Kunst), which amassed an important collection of pictorial photography now housed at Leiden University. A second generation of Dutch pictorialists included Henri Berssenbrugge, Bernard Eilers and Berend Zweers.

=== Russia ===
Pictorialism spread to Russia first through European magazines and was championed by photography pioneers Evgeny Vishnyakov in Russia and Jan Bulhak from Poland. Soon after a new generation of pictorialists became active. These included Aleksei Mazuin, Sergei Lobovikov, Piotr Klepikov, Vassily Ulitin, Nikolay Andreyev, Nikolai Svishchov-Paola, Leonid Shokin, and Alexander Grinberg. In 1894 the Russian Photographic Society was established in Moscow, but differences of opinion among the members led to the establishment of a second organization, the Moscow Society of Art Photography. Both were the primary promoters of pictorialism in Russia for many years.

=== Spain ===
The main centers of pictorial photography in Spain were Madrid and Barcelona. Leading the movement in Madrid was Antonio Cánovas, who founded the Real Sociedad Fotográfica de Madrid and edited the magazine La Fotografía. Cánovas claimed to be the first to introduce artistic photography to Spain, but throughout his career he remained rooted in the allegorical style of the early English pictorialists like Robinson. He refused to use any surface manipulation in his prints, saying that style "is not, cannot be and will never be photography.". Other influential photographers in the country were Carlos Iñigo, Manual Renon, Joan Vilatobà and a person known only as the Conde de la Ventosa. (Note: This was probably José María Álvarez de Toledo y Samaniego (1881–1950), Count of La Ventosa, photographer, and president of the Royal Photographic Society of Madrid.) Unlike the rest of Europe, pictorialism remained popular in Spain throughout the 1920s and 1930s, and Ventosa was the most prolific pictorialist of that period. Unfortunately very few original prints remain from any of these photographers; most of their images are now known only from magazine reproductions.

=== United States ===
One of the key figures in establishing both the definition and direction of pictorialism was American Alfred Stieglitz, who began as an amateur but quickly made the promotion of pictorialism his profession and obsession. Through his writings, his organizing and his personal efforts to advance and promote pictorial photographers, Stieglitz was a dominant figure in pictorialism from its beginnings to its end. Following in the footsteps of German photographers, in 1892 Stieglitz established a group he called the Photo-Secession in New York. Stieglitz hand-picked the members of the group, and he tightly controlled what it did and when it did it. By selecting photographers whose vision was aligned with his, including Gertrude Käsebier, Eva Watson-Schütze, Alvin Langdon Coburn, Edward Steichen, and Joseph Keiley, Stieglitz built a circle of friends who had enormous individual and collective influence over the movement to have photography accepted as art. Stieglitz also continually promoted pictorialism through two publications he edited, Camera Notes and Camera Work and by establishing and running a gallery in New York that for many years exhibited only pictorial photographers (the Little Galleries of the Photo-Secession).

While much initially centered on Stieglitz, pictorialism in the U.S. was not limited to New York. In Boston F. Holland Day was one of the most prolific and noted pictorialists of his time. Clarence H. White, who produced extraordinary pictorial photographs while in Ohio, went on to teach a whole new generation of photographers. On the West Coast the California Camera Club and Southern California Camera Club included prominent pictorialists Annie Brigman, Arnold Genthe, Adelaide Hanscom Leeson, Emily Pitchford and William Edward Dassonville. Later on, the Seattle Camera Club was started by a group of Japanese-American pictorialists, including Dr. Kyo Koike, Frank Asakichi Kunishige and Iwao Matsushita (prominent members later included Ella E. McBride and Soichi Sunami).

== Techniques ==
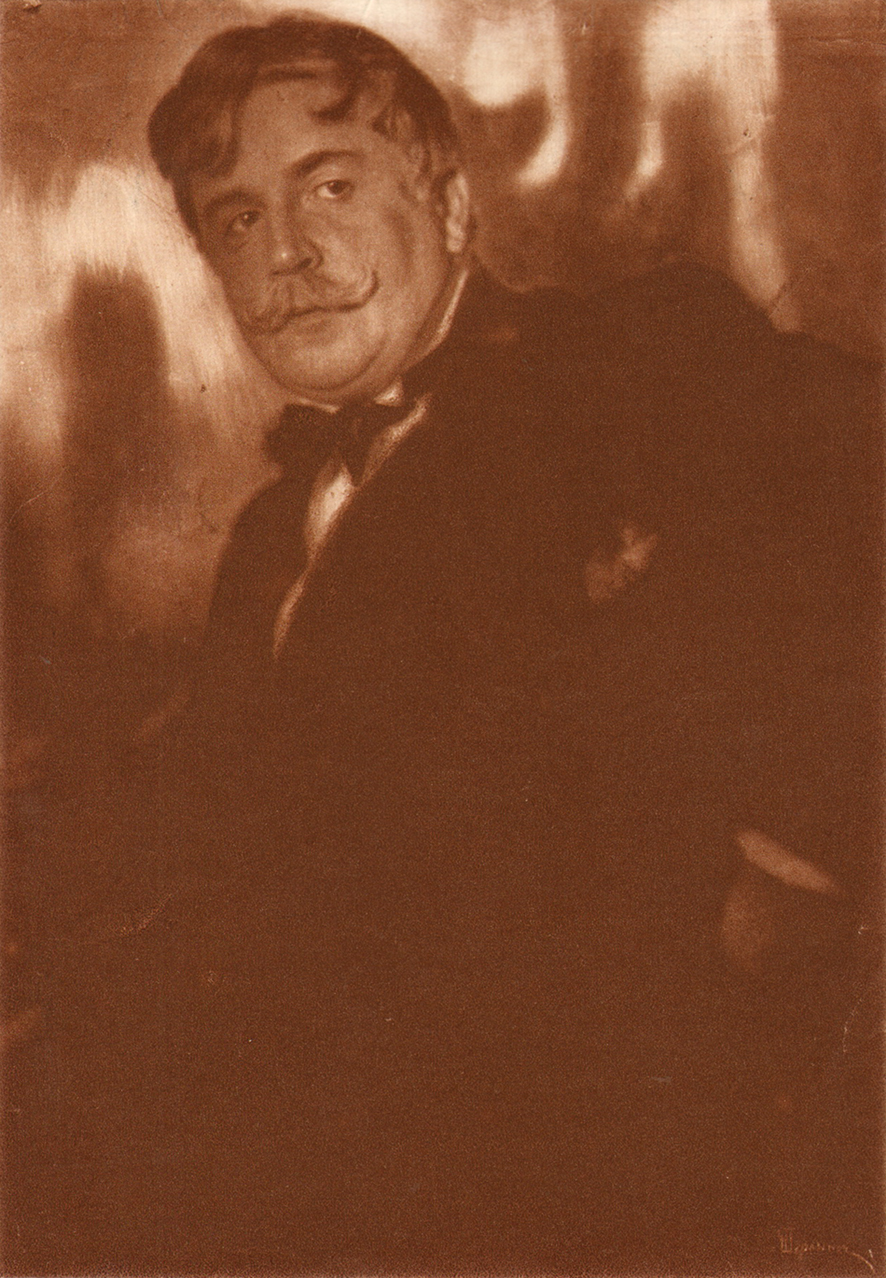
Miron Sherling, Aleksandr Golovin, 1916

Pictorial photographers began by taking an ordinary glass-plate or film negative. Some adjusted the focus of the scene or used a special lens to produce a softer image, but for the most part the printing process controlled the final appearance of the photograph. Pictorialists used a variety of papers and chemical processes to produce particular effects, and some then manipulated the tones and surface of prints with brushes, ink or pigments. The following is a list of the most commonly used pictorial processes. Readers can find more details in books by Crawford and in Daum, Ribemont, and Prodger. Unless otherwise noted, the descriptions below are summarized from these two books.

- Bromoil process: This is a variant on the oil print process that allows a print to be enlarged. In this process a regular silver gelatin print is made, then bleached in a solution of potassium bichromate. This hardens the surface of the print and allows ink to stick to it. Both the lighter and darker areas of a bromoil print may be manipulated.
- Carbon print: This is an extremely delicate print made by coating tissue paper with potassium bichromate, carbon black or another pigment and gelatin. Carbon prints can provide extraordinary detail and are among the most permanent of all photographic prints. Due to the stability of the paper both before and after processing, carbon printing tissue was one of the earliest commercially made photographic products.
- Cyanotype: One of the earliest photographic processes, cyanotypes experienced a brief renewal when pictorialists experimented with their deep blue color tones. The color came from coating paper with light-sensitive iron salts.
- Gum bichromate: One of the pictorialists' favorites, these prints were made by applying gum arabic, potassium bichromate and one or more artist's colored pigments to paper. This sensitized solution slowly hardens where light strikes it, and these areas remain pliable for several hours. The photographer had a great deal of control by varying the mixture of the solution, allowing a shorter or longer exposure and by brushing or rubbing the pigmented areas after exposure.
- Oil print process: Made by applying greasy inks to paper coated with a solution of gum bichromate and gelatin. When exposed through a negative, the gum-gelatin hardens where light strikes it while unexposed areas remain soft. Artist's inks are then applied by brush, and the inks adhere only to the hardened areas. Through this process a photographer can manipulate the lighter areas of a gum print while the darker areas remain stable. An oil print cannot be enlarged since it has to be in direct contact with the negative.
- Platinum print: Platinum prints require a two-steps process. First, paper is sensitized with iron salts and exposed in contact with a negative until a faint image is formed. Then the paper is chemically developed in a process that replaces the iron salts with platinum. This produces an image with a very wide range of tones, each intensely realized.

== Pictorial photographers ==
Following are two lists of prominent photographers who engaged in pictorialism during their careers. The first list includes photographers who were predominantly pictorialists for all or almost all of their careers (generally those active from 1880 to 1920). The second list includes 20th-century photographers who used a pictorial style early in the careers but who are more well known for pure or straight photography.

=== Photographers who were predominantly pictorialists ===
- Wayne Albee, 1882–1937, American
- James Craig Annan, 1846–1946, Scottish
- Zaida Ben-Yusuf, 1869–1933, American
- Fernand Bignon, 1888–1969, French
- Alice Boughton, 1866?–1943, American
- Anne Brigman, 1869–1950, American
- Alice Burr, 1883–1968, American
- Vladimír Jindřich Bufka, 1887–1916, Czech
- Jan Bułhak, 1876–1950, Polish
- Sidney Carter, 1880-1956, Canadian
- Harold Cazneaux, 1878–1953, Australian
- Rose Clark, 1852–1942, American
- Alvin Langdon Coburn, 1882–1966, American/English
- F. Holland Day, 1864–1933, American
- George Davison, 1854–1930, English
- Robert Demachy, 1859–1936, French
- Mary Devens, 1857–1920, American
- Pierre Dubreuil, 1872–1944, French
- Rudolf Eickemeyer Jr., 1862–1932, American
- Peter Henry Emerson, 1856–1936, English
- Frederick H. Evans, 1853–1943, English
- Frank Eugene, 1865–1936, American
- Ogawa Isshin, 1860–1929, Japanese
- S. D. Jouhar, 1901–1963, British
- Gertrude Käsebier, 1852–1934, American
- Minna Keene, 1861–1943, Canadian
- Kajima Seibei, 1866–1924, Japanese
- Joseph Keiley, 1869–1914
- Kyo Koike, 1878–1947, Japanese-American
- Heinrich Kühn, 1866–1944, Austrian
- Sarah Ladd, 1860–1927, American
- Adelaide Hanscom Leeson, 1875–1931, American
- Eugene Lemaire, 1874–1948, Belgian
- Gustave Marissiaux, 1872–1929, Belgian
- Adoph de Meyer, 1868–1949, French/German
- Léonard Misonne, 1870–1943, Belgian
- William Mortensen, 1897–1965, American
- Ogawa Kazumasa, 1860–1929, Japanese
- Constant Puyo, 1857–1933, French
- Jane Reece, 1868?–1961, American
- Guido Rey, 1861–1935, Italian
- Henry Peach Robinson, 1830–1901, English
- Sarah Choate Sears, 1858–1935, American
- George Seeley, 1880–1955, American
- Clara Sipprell, 1885–1975, American/Canadian
- Karl Struss, 1886–1981, American
- Miron Sherling, 1880–1951, Russian
- Frank Sutcliffe, 1853–1941, English
- John William Twycross,1871–1936, Australian
- Elizabeth Flint Wade, 1849–1915, American
- Agnes Warburg, 1872–1953, English
- Margaret Watkins, 1884–1969, Canadian
- Eva Watson-Schütze, 1867–1935, American
- Hans Watzek, 1843–1903, Austrian
- Clarence H. White, 1871–1925, American
- Myra Albert Wiggins, 1869–1956, American

=== 20th-century photographers who began as pictorialists ===
- Ansel Adams, 1902–1984, American
- Cecil Bostock, 1884–1939, Australian
- Olive Cotton, 1911–2003, Australian
- Imogen Cunningham, 1883–1976, American
- Laura Gilpin, 1891–1979, American
- Margrethe Mather, 1886‒1952, American
- Karl Maria Udo Remmes, 1954–2014, German
- Stefanie Schneider, born 1968, German American
- Edward Steichen, 1879–1973, American
- Alfred Stieglitz, 1864–1946, American
- Soichi Sunami, 1885–1971, Japanese-American
- Edward Weston, 1886–1958, American
- Yuri Eremin, 1881–1948, Russian Empire/Soviet Union

== See also ==
- List of Camera Work issues
