= Nikolay Andreyev =

Nikolay Andreyev may refer to:

- Nikolai Andreev, Russian mathematician and popularizer of mathematics
- Nikolay Andreyev (sculptor) (1873–1932), Russian sculptor, graphic artist and stage designer
- Nikolay Andreyev (photographer) (1882–1947), Russian photographer and photo artist
- Nikolai Andreyev (physicist) (1880–1970), Soviet physicist
- Nikolay Andreyev (folklorist) (1892–1942), Russian folklorist and literary critic
