= Karl Maria Udo Remmes =

German photographer (1954–2014)

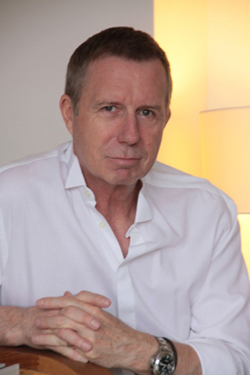
Portrait of Karl Maria Udo Remmes

Karl Maria Udo Remmes (born 2 July 1954 in Tübingen, West Germany – 25 November 2014 in Köln) was a German photographer and physician. He has become known especially for his work in backstage photography specializing in opera, ballet and musicals. The leading idea of Remmes' photographic work is not the documentation – he wants to capture the moments when the hard work of acting transmutes into art.

== Education ==
After studying biology and medicine, Remmes did his medical doctorate in 1986 in neuroradiology, and became a consultant radiologist specialized in cross sectional imaging. He was awarded a Graduation in Professional Photography by the New York Institute of Photography.

== Career ==
Remmes' first photo exhibition "Operaria" at the University of Düsseldorf presents a portrait of backstage operations of the Deutsche Oper am Rhein. Remmes worked at various European opera and ballet theatres such as the Teatro Regio of Turin, the Graz Opera, the English National Opera in London, the Savonlinna Opera Festival in Finland and at the Chang'an Grand Theatre in Beijing, China. In 2002, the Theatre Museum Düsseldorf established the "Remmes Collection". Remmes was elected a Fellow of the Royal Photographic Society (FRPS), Fellow of the Royal Society of Arts (FRSA) and a Fellow of The Royal Society of Medicine. He represented the City of Düsseldorf at the World Exhibition EXPO 2010 in Shanghai, showing his work in an exhibition on the interface between theater work and theatrical stage art in Liu Haisu Art Museum Shanghai

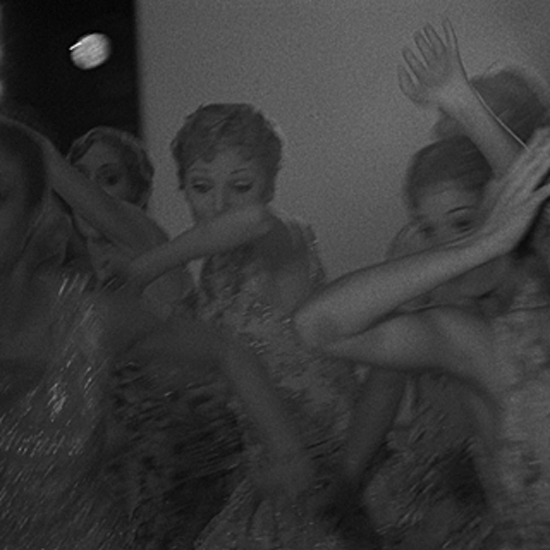
Udo Remmes, Behind the velvet curtain, 2002

== Photographic style ==
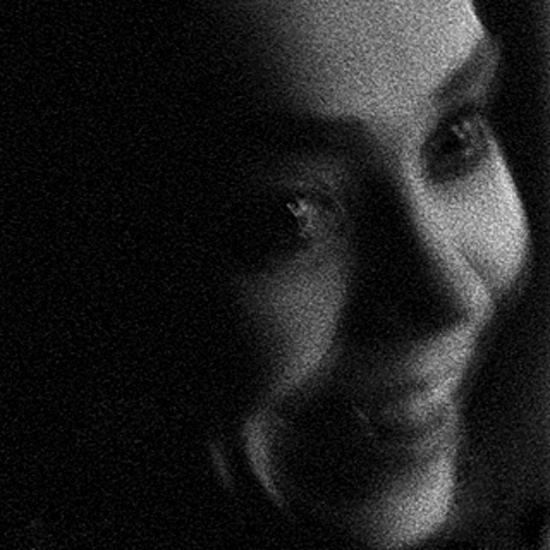
Udo Remmes, Portrait of a ballet dancer, Deutsche Oper am Rhein, Düsseldorf 2005

Remmes ' photographic style is based on pictorialism. His "Intrinsic Photography" (Remmes about his work) is contrary to the New Objectivity of the Düsseldorf School of Photography founded by Bernd and Hilla Becher. He captures multiple dimensions of theater reality by including diverse temporal, spatial, contextual and reality layers in one image. His pictures tell stories of the theatre machinery. He shows the backgrounds and unwritten laws, the union of scientific and superstitious components behind the scenes. Remmes writes small notes and poems with light to show different realities: the world outside and the artificial world on stage, when actors and singers swap from one world to the other. He represents modern theatre photography but he's not interested in personality cult or in documentation of the action on stage. He uses unusual prospects, i.e. bird's eye view. The photographs carry emotion in a different way, by blurred and strong contrasted sujets. Remmes manages to bring the sensitive balance between theatrical work and art to perceptibility.

== Exhibitions ==
- 2000 Operaria, Universitäts- u. Landesbibliothek Düsseldorf
- 2001 Gorgoneion, Pfalzbau Ludwigshafen / Kongresshaus Baden-Baden. Serenissima Serenata, Kosmas & Damian – In memoriam 9–11, Johannes-Kirche Düsseldorf
- 2002 Behind the Velvet Curtain, 105. Deutscher Ärztetag Rostock. Operaria II, Leica-Gallery, Leica Headquarters Solms
- 2003 Operaria II, Leica-Gallery Tokyo, Japan
- 2003 Theatermuseum Düsseldorf: Moments of Art / Collection „Remmes". Behind the Velvet Curtain, Pontos de Vista, Portugal
- 2004 Operaria III, Rathaus Schöneberg, Berlin, Germany
- 2005 Operaria III, Landesärztekammer Hannover, Germany. Augenblicke der Kunst, Goethe-Institut Beijing, China. He Xiangning Art Museum, Shenzhen, China
- 2006 Portraits der Schauspielerin Gudrun Landgrebe, Galerie Petra Lange, Berlin, Germany
- 2009 BlickWechsel oder Die Kunst des Zuschauens, Theatermuseum Düsseldorf, Royal Photographic Society, Ink Play – Play Ink, Theatermuseum Düsseldorf, Liu Haisu Museum Shanghai. Die Kunst des Zuschauens (The Art of Viewing), Park-Theater Iserlohn, Royal Photographic Society
- 2010 Zuschauerkunst, Theatermuseum Düsseldorf. Moments of Art III, Liu Haisu Art Museum Shanghai in the framework of Expo 2010 Shanghai representing the City of Düsseldorf
- 2013 Gudrun Landgrebe – Rückblick, Theatermuseum Düsseldorf

== Literature ==
- Meiszies W (Hrsg), Augenblicke der Kunst – Udo Remmes fotografiert Theaterarbeit, Theatermuseum Düsseldorf 2003, ISBN 3-929945-19-3
- Newman H, Capturing magic with a Leica, Shenzhen Daily, p. 15, 2005-11-08
- Sebastian K, Magie des Theaters, Rheinische Post Nr. 49, 2003-02-27
- Sadler, Richard, The Art of Seeing. RPS Contemporary Photography No. 27
- Matzigkeit, R., On Stage / Backstage. SchwarzWeiss Nr. 37
- Traditional Excellence by Digital Design, RPS Journal Vol. 146, ISSN 1468-8670
- Remmes, Udo – Nô-Images, Theatermuseum Düsseldorf/ Kreismuseum Zons, 2004
- Remmes, Udo – Tracing C.C., 1998–2006
- Remmes, Udo – Visual Art is... What? A Venture to clarify a Position, RPS Visual Art Magazine Winter 2010/11
- Remmes, Udo; Köhler, Andreas; Sikau, Holger – Venice, 2011
- Remmes, Udo; Jancke, Stephanie – China, 2013
- TheGlobalArtFederation (Hrsg), Karl Maria Udo Remmes – Round and About The Magic City – Miami, Stephanie Jancke Verlag, Cologne 2014, ISBN 978-3-945335-01-7
