= Kyo Koike =

Poet, physician, and photographer (b. 1878, d. 1947)

- 小池 恭
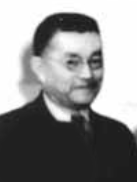
- Born: February 11, 1878; Shimane Prefecture of Japan
- Died: March 31, 1947 (aged 69); Seattle

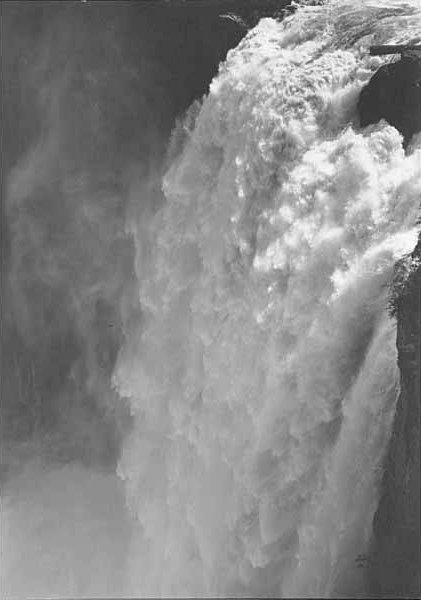
Thousand Thunders (4557923267)

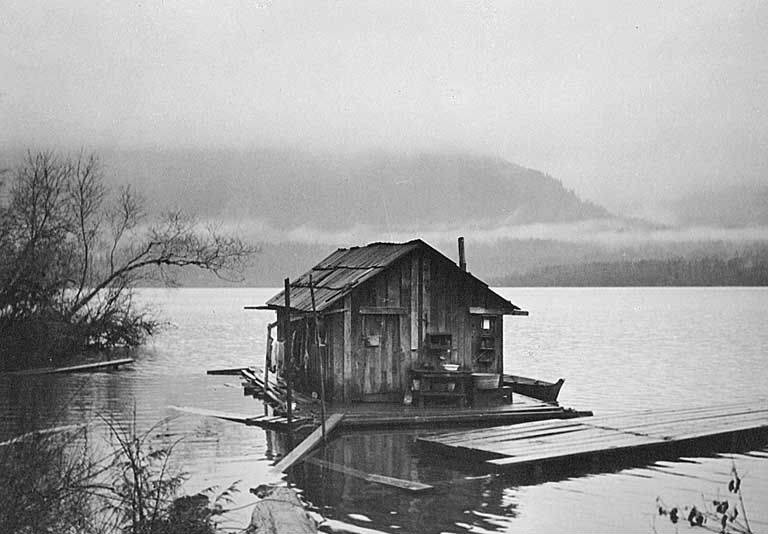
Called a Home (4669580541)

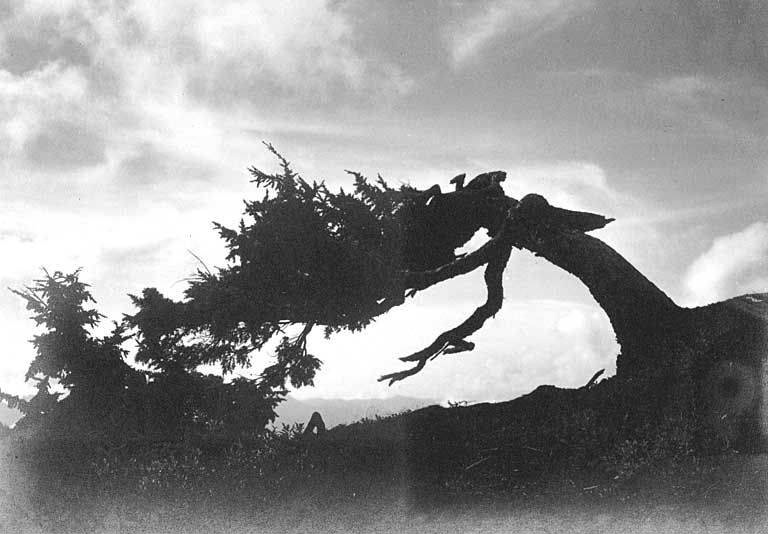
Crooked by Mountain Weather (4557923877)

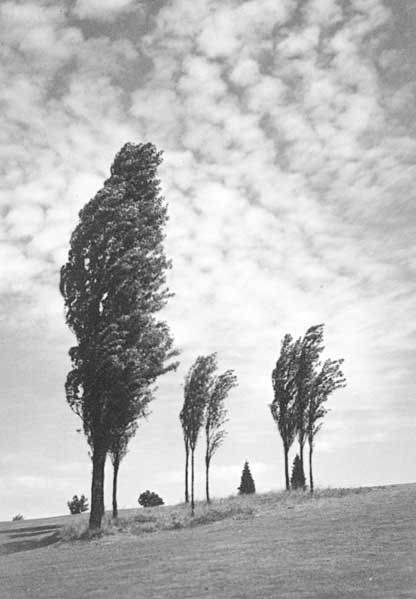
At the Mercy of Summer Breeze (4558554848)

Dr. Kyo Koike (小池 恭, Koike Kyō; February 11, 1878 – March 31, 1947) was a Japanese-American poet, physician and photographer.

== Photography ==
Koike arrived in Seattle in 1916 at the age of 38, and established a medical clinic in the downtown area near Main Street and 5th Avenue.

Although he was a respected professional surgeon, his first love was photography. He was a participant in the first Frederick & Nelson art salon, noted for his pictorialist style, and innovative combination of an Eastern and Western aesthetic.

He was a member of the Royal Photographic Society of Great Britain, and was designated a Fellow in 1928. He was also Director of the Associated Camera Clubs of America.

His solo exhibitions included the Kodak Park Camera Club, Rochester, NY, 1926, the Portage Camera Club, Akron, Ohio, 1927, the Brooklyn Institute of Arts & Sciences in 1928, and The Art Institute of Seattle in 1929.

Koike was the originator of the Seattle Camera Club. Given his thriving practice in the Japanese community in Seattle, his professional income allowed him not only to concentrate on his photography but to underwrite many of the expenses of forming the club. He was the editor of the club's newsletter Notan. He left all of his photographs and extensive records of the Seattle Camera Club to fellow club member Iwao Matsushita upon his death.

== Poetry ==
Koike was also a noted poet, under the pen name Banjin (晩人). He was a member of the Rainier Ginsha, a Seattle Haiku poetry society formed in 1934 by poet Kyōu Kawajiri.

== Internment during World War II ==
During Internment of Japanese Americans in World War II all of his photographic equipment was confiscated by the U.S. government, and he was taken to the Minidoka War Relocation Center in Idaho. While being detained he formed a new poetry society called Minidoka Ginsha. By 1945, the group consisted of over 158 poets. Koike became ill in the camps and died in 1947, shortly after his release.
