= Rose Simmonds =

Australian photographer, member of Pictorialism movement (1877–1960)

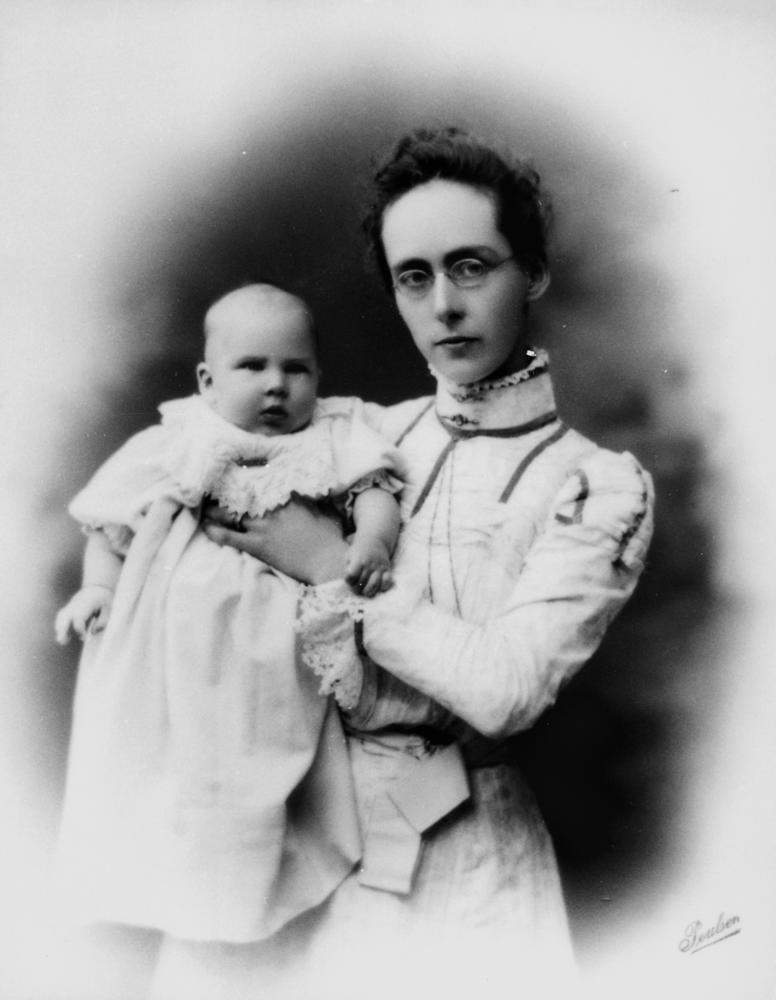
- Born: 26 July 1877; Islington, England
- Died: 3 July 1960 (aged 82); Auchenflower, Australia
- Occupation: Photographer

Rose Simmonds (26 July 1877 – 3 July 1960) was a British-born Australian photographer and member of the Pictorialism movement.

== Life ==
Rose Culpin was born in Islington in 1877. She was brought up in the UK by her parents Hannah Louise and Dr Millice Culpin. She and her parents emigrated to Australia around 1891 and her father established a medical practice at Taringa. She attended Brisbane Girls' Grammar School and Brisbane Technical College, but she did not become interested in photography until after her marriage as her new husband, John Howard Simmonds. It is presumed that she was intrigued by her new husband's darkroom as he developed his own pictures of his stone masonry commissions.

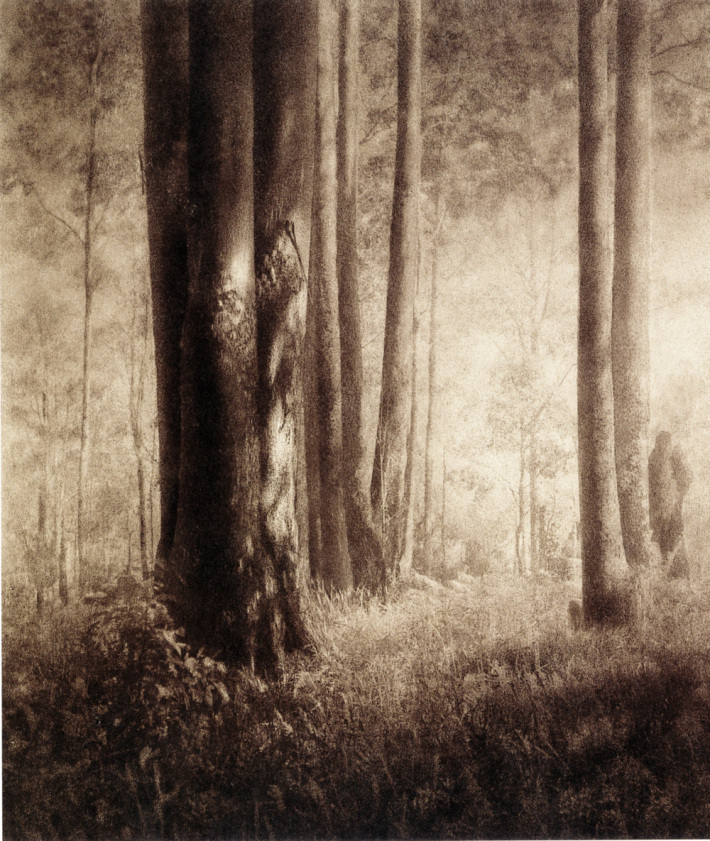
"Tall-and-Stately" -1930s photo

Initially Simmonds took pictures of her sons but by 1928 she had been entering her pictures into monthly contests organised by the Queensland Camera Club and the Australasian Photo-Review. By August 1928 she was a committee member and, building on her knowledge of painting, her impressionistic photograph "Playground of the Shadows" took first place.

Her work reflected her artistic training and her style has been compared to Claude Monet. The University of Queensland compares her work to painters such as Arthur Streeton, Elioth Grüner and Jean-Baptiste-Camille Corot. Simmonds was taking photographs until the 1940s and in 1941 she had a solo exhibition of her work.

Simmonds died in Auchenflower, Queensland in 1960.
