= Jane Reece (photographer) =

American photographer

Jane Reece (June 18, 1868 – June 10, 1961) was a highly acclaimed American pictorial photographer of the early 20th century. She lived most of her life in Dayton, Ohio and was active in the local, national and international photography scenes. During her 40-year career she exhibited in more than 100 photography salons and shows around the world, receiving many awards, prizes and honors. Reece is now recognized as one of Dayton's most prominent artists.

== Biography ==
Reece was secretive about her age and many facts about her life. At times she appears to have embellished or exaggerated details of her history. Much of what is known to be true about her was assembled from her studio records, letters and interviews with friends and family members. She claimed to have been born in a log cabin near West Jefferson, Ohio; she never revealed, and may not have known, the exact date. Records indicate she was one of four children born to William L. Reece (1833-1879) and Mary Augsburger Ransomer (1837-1934). William Reece was a veteran of the American Civil War, during which he was a prisoner of war. Following his death, she and her siblings were raised in reduced circumstances in Zanesville, Ohio. Her brother Lawson took up photography there and worked in the photographic studio of Muntz and Pack. Reece also worked there briefly and was listed as an "artist" or "artist-retoucher".

Like many photographers during this period Reece began her artistic career as a painter, and she claimed she only began to photograph in earnest when a serious illness, thought to be spinal meningitis or tuberculosis, forced her to abandon painting in 1903. She said that she took up photography while recovering from the illness at the home of relatives in Southern Pines, North Carolina, at the insistence of the nurse who cared for her. However, in 1901-02 Reece was listed in the Dayton City Directory as having a "studio", and there are dozens of photographic portraits taken by her that appear to be from this period.

In December 1903 Reece returned from her North Carolina recuperation, and moved to Dayton, where she opened a large photographic studio (she called it "The Rembrandt," hoping the artistic name would help attract clients who wanted studio portraits - her strategy worked well, for within the next year she recorded that she made more than 600 photographic silhouette portraits).

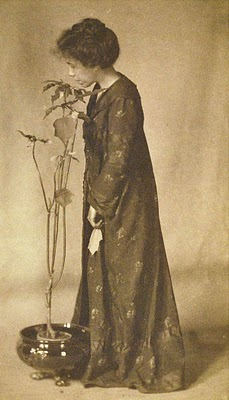
The Poinsettia Girl), by Jane Reece (1907)

Within a few years Reece's photographic style evolved from simple portraiture to a more artistic vision. For inspiration she subscribed to Alfred Stieglitz's important magazines Camera Notes and Camera Work. In 1907 she produced one of her best-known images, a self-portrait known as The Poinsettia Girl. In this work, Reece may have been influenced by another woman photographer, Eva Watson-Schütze, whose photograph The Rose was published in Camera Work in 1905.

By 1909 she felt the need of advanced training in photography, and she moved briefly to New York to study with Clarence H. White at Columbia University. She stayed there for slightly less than four months, and later she claimed that White found her work too advanced for her to remain his student. Both White's and Reece's records and notes from that period are unclear about her actual attendance at Columbia, although she did produce a portrait of White in his studio. She is also known to have met Gertrude Käsebier during this visit, although the extent of their connection is unclear. Reece returned to Dayton in October of that year and opened a new portrait studio. Within a short while she had numerous clients, and for the next several years she made many commercial portraits of Dayton's prominent families.

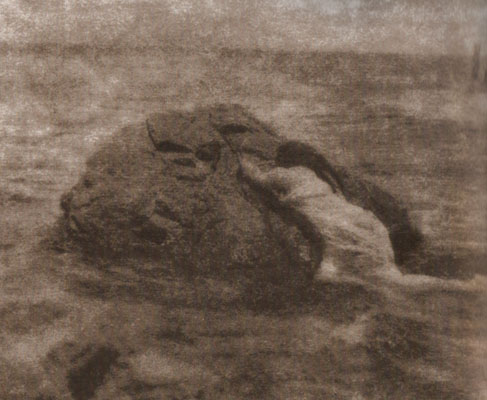
The Soul in Bondage), by Jane Reece (1911)

In 1911 Reece traveled to California, where she made a small series of photographs that both define her artistic style and her life at the time. The series, called The Soul in Bondage, interpreted the mythological story of Andromeda who was bound to rocks by the ocean and rescued by Perseus. Reece took the pictures on Catalina Island, and the model is thought to have been former Dayton resident Marie Peiza. Dominque Vasseur, former curator at the Dayton Art Institute, said this series "symbolizes a psychological and emotional struggle of great proportion which one must assume to be autobiographical." At the time, Reece was questioning her commitment to photography and to the career she had chosen; she was experiencing financial hardships, and her health was poor.

She must have resolved whatever doubts she had before going to California, for after she returned to Dayton in 1912 she expanded her artistic repertoire to include both her portrait business, and artistic images. Among her more famous works from this period are The Veteran (1912) and Whence (1916).

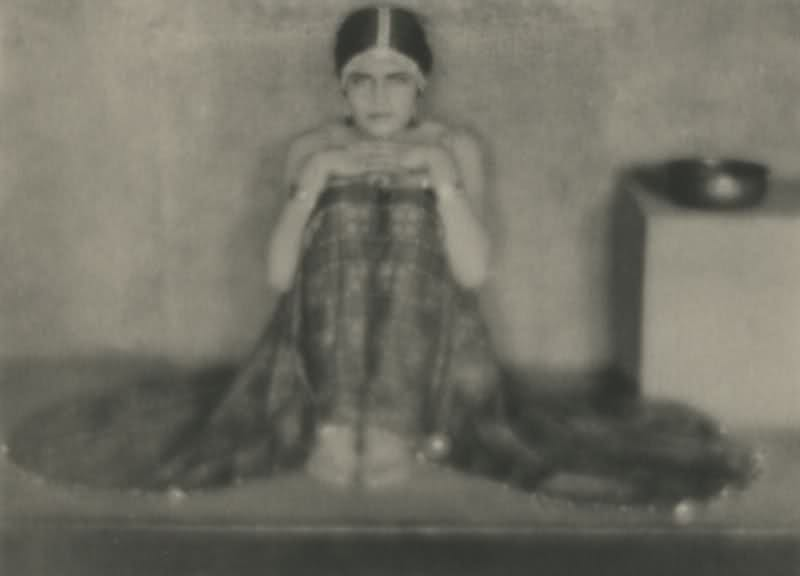
Jane Reece. Have Drowned My Glory in a Shallow Cup (Tina Modotti), 1919.

In 1919 Reece returned to visit friends in Los Angeles, and while there she photographed Edward Weston, Tina Modotti and her common-law husband Roubaix de l'Abrie Richey. In keeping with her pictorial style, she posed both Modotti and Richey in costume and gave them "artistic" characters. A photograph of Richey posing as Christ was titled Son of Man, while one of Modotti was called Have Drowned My Glory in a Shallow Cup; this has become one of her best known images. The title comes from a line (from stanza 93) taken from Edward Fitzgerald's 1859 translation of Omar Khayyam's Rubaiyat, "Have drown'd my Glory in a shallow Cup/And sold my Reputation for a Song."

Reece, who suffered from both mental and physical ailments throughout her life, became ill while in Los Angeles and remained there until late 1920. When she returned to Dayton, she entered into the most prolific and artistically significant period of her career. During most of the 1920s and early 1930s she achieved both national and international acclaim for her work, receiving international recognition and awards. One reason for her success was that she incorporated a variety of different styles in her work; she regularly experimented with different genres, models and subject matter. Photography historian Naomi Rosenblum said Reece "was a scavenger of styles, finding ideas both in portraiture and for salon work in Naturalists, Symbolist, and on occasion, Cubist art." Susan Talbot-Stanaway, Director of the Zanesville (Ohio) Museum of Art, which holds about 70 of Reece's photographs, said Reece loved to create "carefully constructed little stories" in her images.

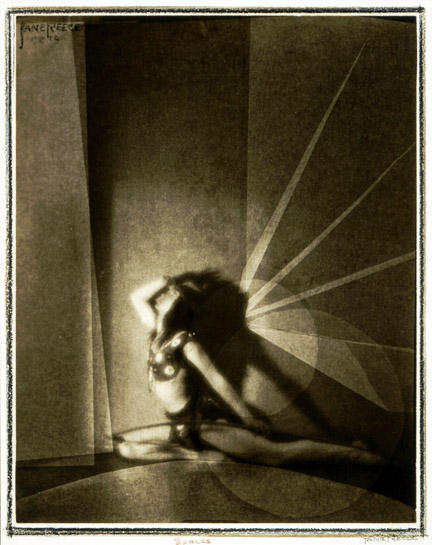
Spaces (Harry Losée), by Jane Reece (1922)

Some of her most striking photographs were created in 1922, when she overlaid negatives she took of dancer Harry Losée with stencils to create bold, geometric lighting patterns reminiscent of later work by Man Ray. Also during this time Reece experimented with Autochromes and short films.

Due to her increased fame in the 1920s, Reece was engaged to take portraits of many artists and celebrities of the time, including Count and Countess Ilya Tolstoy, Jan Kubelik, Margaret Woodrow Wilson, Herman Sachs, Robert Frost, Roland Hayes and Helen Keller. After a visit to Europe in 1923–24, she was in demand for many international exhibitions. During the three-year period from 1928 to 1930 her photographs were included in at least 65 salons and exhibitions, including major shows in New York, Chicago, Boston, Los Angeles, Paris, London, Prague, Amsterdam, Tokyo, Stockholm, Copenhagen, Toronto, Edinburgh, Madrid and Antwerp.

Sometime in the mid-1930s, Reece's eyesight began to fail, and, coupled with the decline in the popularity of pictorialism, she began to produce less and less. In 1944, at the age of 76, she finally said she was giving up photography altogether due to "my silent ears and my dimming vision".

She continued to exhibit her works and was honored with one-person shows at the Carmel Art Institute and the Dayton Art Institute in 1947. By the 1950s, however, pictorialism had largely fallen out of favor in the photography world, and Reece, finding no further use for her archives, donated over 400 photographs to the Dayton Art Institute. She lived out her last years in increasing ill health, isolation and poverty. She died in Dayton eight days before her 93rd birthday. Her collection of more than 10,000 glass plate negatives was left to Wright State University.

Since Reece's death, her work has been rediscovered, and she is now recognized for her strong artistic vision and her leadership in photography during a changing time in the medium's history. The Dayton Art Institute has held two retrospectives of her work since her death, one in 1986 and again in 1997.
