= Rose Clark =

American photographer (1852–1942)

- Born: Harriet Candace Clark; 1852; La Port, Indiana
- Died: November 28, 1942 (aged 90); Buffalo, New York
- Known for: Painting, Photography

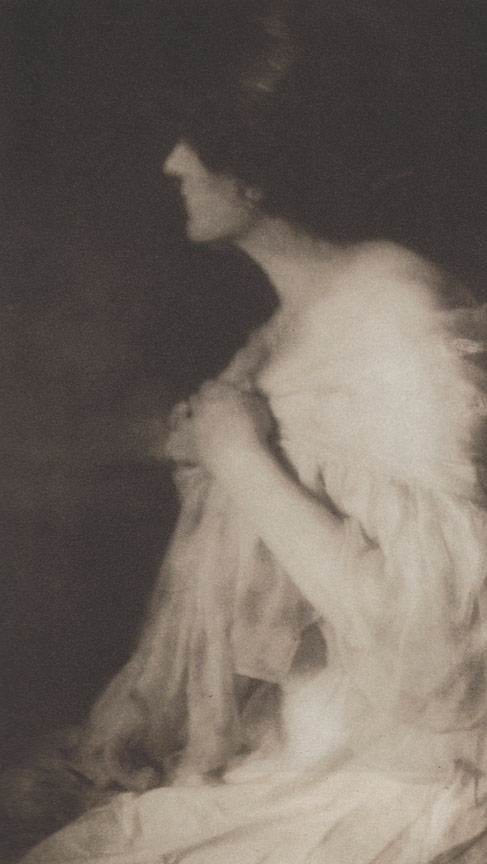
"Miss M., of Washington", by Rose Clark and Elizabeth Flint Wade. Photogravure published in Camera Notes, Vol 4 No 4, 1901

Harriet Candace "Rose" Clark (1852 – November 28, 1942) was an early 20th-century American painter and pictorial photographer. She is best known for the photographs she exhibited with Elizabeth Flint Wade under their joint names, either as "Rose Clark and Elizabeth Flint Wade" or as "Misses Clark and Wade".

== Life ==
Harriet Candace "Rose" Clark was born in 1852 in La Port, Indiana. She was trained as a painter and taught painting and drawing in the 1880s at Saint Margaret’s School in Buffalo, New York. One of her students was Mabel Dodge Luhan, and Clark later designed and restored Luhan’s villa in Florence, Italy.

Beginning in 1890, she became active as a photographer and worked independently until 1898. Sometime in the late 1890s, she met Wade, and the two began their twelve-year collaboration. In about 1900, she began corresponding with Alfred Stieglitz, who encouraged and counseled her in her art. Stieglitz cited her, along with Gertrude Käsebier, Eva Watson-Schütze, and Mary Devens, as one of the ten most prominent American pictorial photographers currently working in an article in Century Magazine in 1902.

Clark apparently learned some of her photographic artistry from Käsebier; later in her life she said she owed Käsebier for "any success she had with a camera".

About 1920, she moved from Buffalo to New York City, where she advertised her portraits and other paintings for substantial amounts (up to $2,000 for full-length portraits). She returned to Buffalo in 1926.

Clark never married and little is known about her private life. She died in Buffalo on November 28, 1942 and was buried in La Porte. Her obituary focused on her work as a painter and did not mention anything about her photography.

== Misses Clark and Wade ==
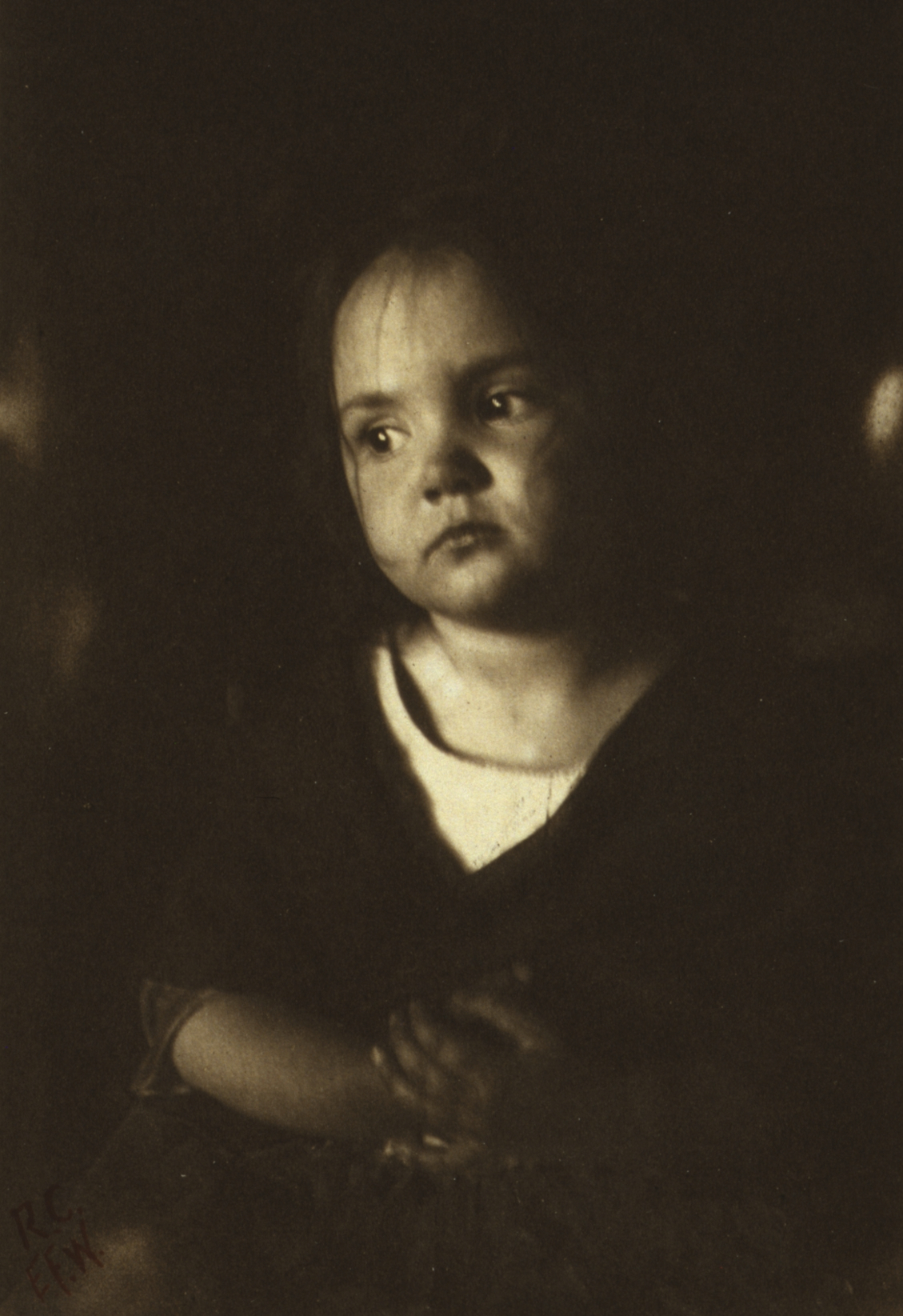
"Annetje", an 1898 platinum print by Clark and Wade, with both of their initials in the bottom corner.

For reasons that have never been explained, Clark and Wade began exhibiting and publishing photos under their joint names beginning in 1899. For many years, it was assumed that Clark was the artist who took all of the photographs and Wade was the technician who developed and printed them. Clark herself alluded to this type of arrangement in a letter to Stieglitz in 1900: “Mrs. Wade is very dilatory – and in order to get the photographs you ask for… I will have to prod her daily.” However, in a letter to Frances Benjamin Johnston that same year, Clark said “Both Miss Wade and myself have used cameras for perhaps ten years or more, but it is only two years ago that we took up portrait work as a business.”

The concept of the artist/technician split in their partnership also might have come from the fact that Clark also had several solo exhibitions while Wade exhibited very little under her own name. There are, however, indications that Wade made aesthetic decisions as well as technical ones. She clearly had interest in and knowledge of aesthetics, and in several of her articles she gives advice on artistic direction. In addition, at least one article featured work under her name alone along with others under their joint names.

Clark and Wade first exhibited under their joint names at shows at the Buffalo Society of Artists and the New York Camera Club in 1899. Over the next decade their photos were featured in major exhibitions around the world, including the Art Institute of Chicago, Pennsylvania Academy of Fine Arts, Photo-club de Paris, Pan-American Exposition, Corcoran Gallery of Art and the Louisiana Purchase Exposition.

In 1902, Stieglitz included a print by Clark and Wade in Series 2 of the landmark portfolio American Pictorial Photography. Printed in a limited edition of 150 copies, the portfolio was intended to show only the best photography according to Stieglitz’s discerning eye.

Their collaboration apparently ended around 1910. The reason for the dissolution of their joint effort is not known, although it might have been due to a change in the health of Wade, who died five years later.
