= Kajima Seibei =

Japanese photographer (1866–1924)

Kajima Seibei (鹿島 清兵衛; 1866–1924) was a Japanese photographer. In 2019, Fujifilm Square in Tokyo sponsored a Photo History Museum Exhibition on his work and legacy, entitled, "The Story of Seibei Kajima, the 'Millionaire Photographer' in the Meiji Period." This exhibit presented Kajima as a trailblazer in Japanese portrait and landscape photography, who developed new techniques. For example, by devising large-format cameras to take oversized photographs, by experimenting with X-rays, and by employing the magnesium flash to take photographs at night.

== Gallery ==
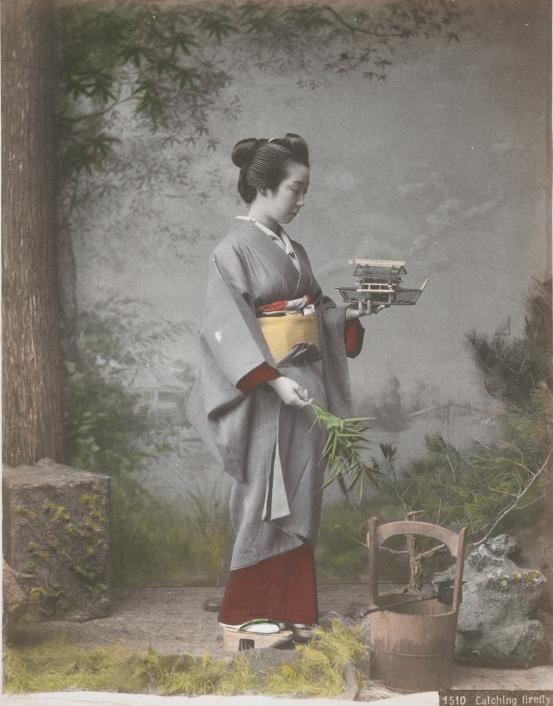
Ponta Kajima Seibei

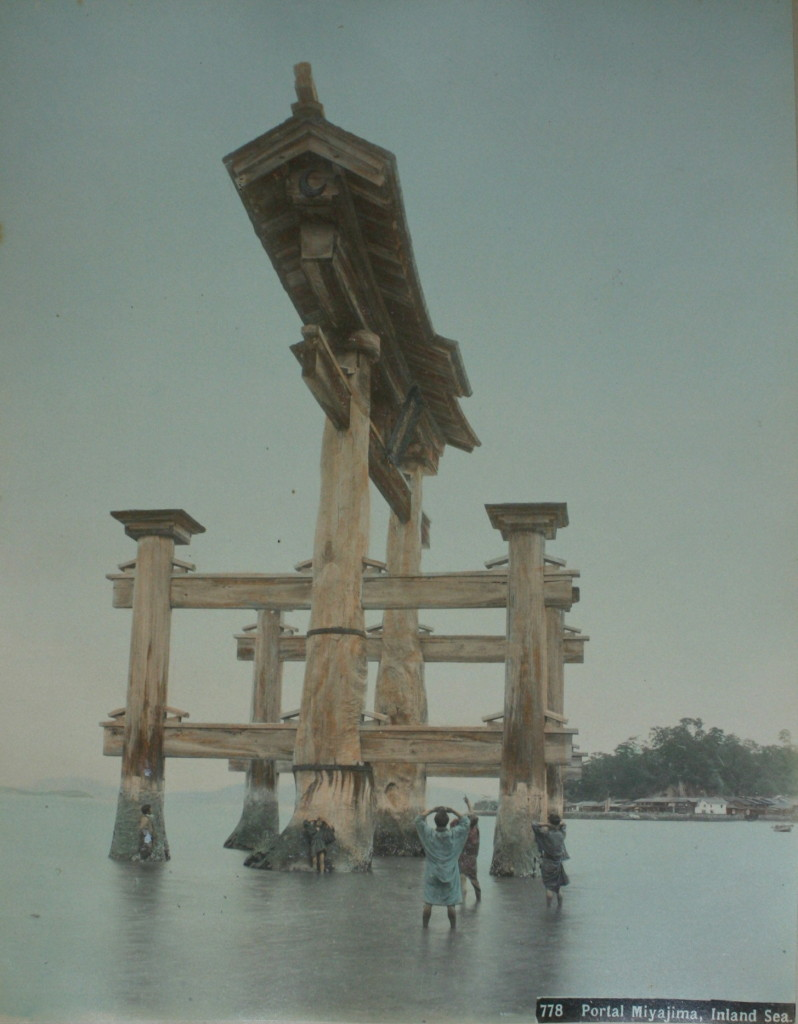
Potalmiyaji mainland sea

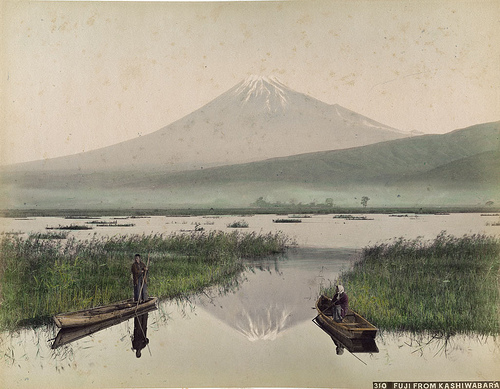

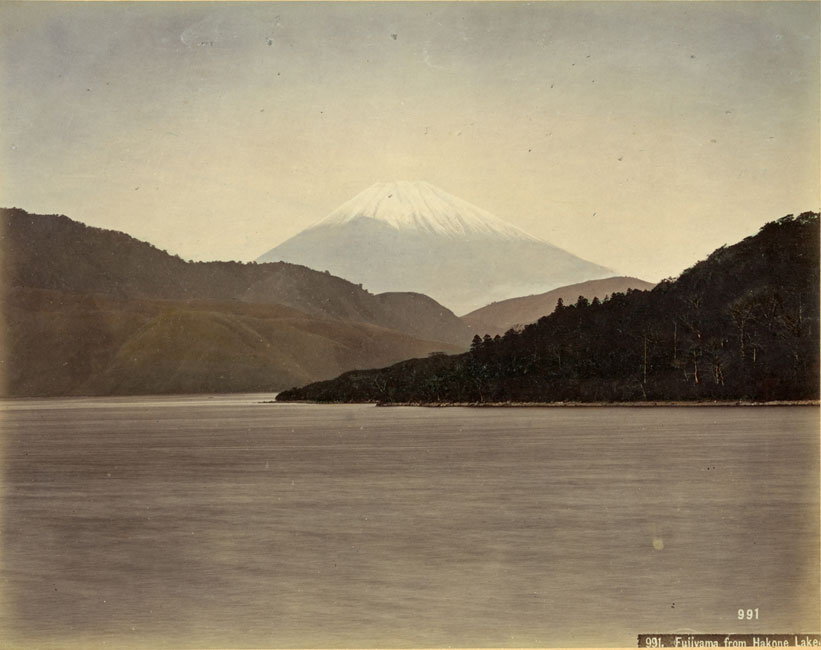

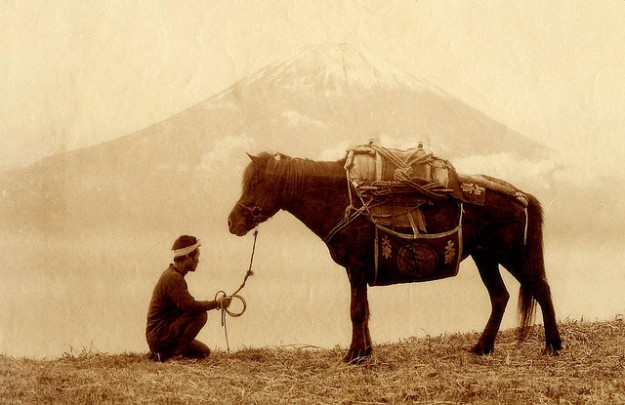
