= Nikolay Andreyev (photographer) =

Nikolay Platonovich Andreyev
- Никола́й Плато́нович Андре́ев
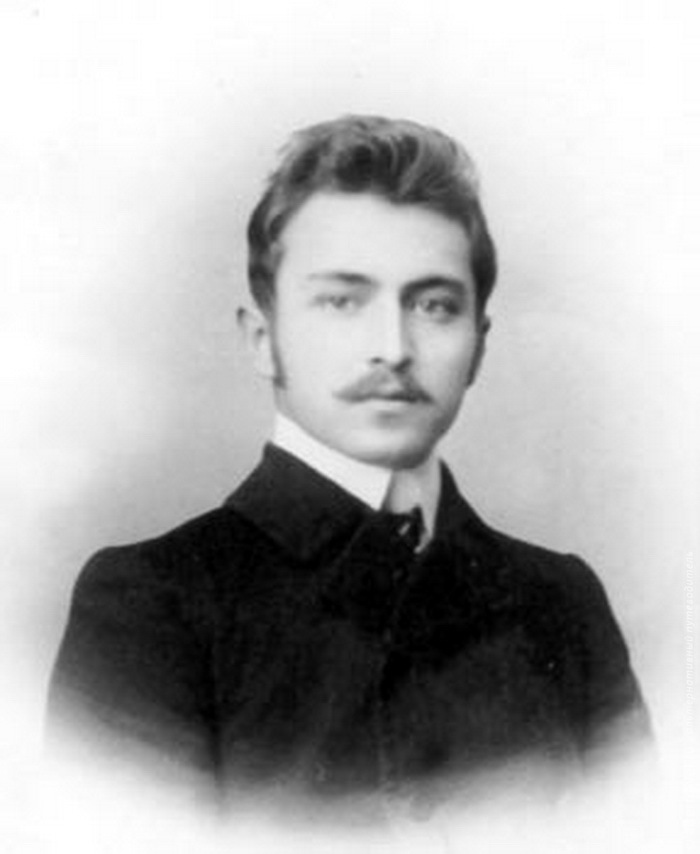
- At 1920s
- Born: October 1, 1882; Serpukhov, Russian Empire
- Died: April 13, 1947 (aged 64); USSR
- Occupation: Fine art photographer
- Style: Pictorialism

Nikolay Platonovich Andreyev (Russian: Никола́й Плато́нович Андре́ев; October 1, 1882 – April 13, 1947) was a pioneering Russian photographer and photo artist.

== Early life ==
Nikolay Andreyev was born at 1-st of October 1882 in Serpukhov. He had three sisters and one brother. By his autobiography, his father Platon Andreyevich Andreyev was a hairdresser and his mother Elizaveta Mihailovna was a laundress. But this is not true. It was dangerous to show noble or merchant origin in the 1920s and 1930s. In fact, Platon Andreyevich was a rather successful merchant and had barbershop, laundry and tea room. At 1902 Platon Andreyevich was documented as a merchant of the second guild and had a two-store brick house at 1-Moskovskaya street in Serpukhov. He had bought or built this house in the late nineteenth.

Nikolay Andreyev was educated at Serpukhov modern school (Russian: Се́рпуховское реа́льное учи́лище) and his sisters at a gymnasium. His father hoped that Nikolay would take on his business, but his father's dreams would never come to pass.

Nikolay had been from childhood attracted by painting and drawing, and later by photography. Besides that, he played clarinet and flute. Nikolay especially liked flute and had several ancient silver flutes. Nikolay performed musical compositions of Gluck, Vivaldi and Bach. Other hobbies of Nikolay Andreyev were ballroom dances and motor-cycle races. At 1911 on a ballroom dances contest organized by Firefighters Society of Serpukhov (Russian: Пожарное общество Серпухова) he took the first place and valuable desk set. Nikolay had a BMW motorcycle.

After graduating from modern school and conflicting with his father, Nikolay Andreyev left his father's home and launched his own photographer's studio in the old part of Serpukhov, near modern Lunacharsky Street. His photographic business was successful and gave financial independence to him.
