= Elizabeth Flint Wade =

American photographer (1849–1915)

- Born: Elizabeth Flint; October 29, 1849; Cassville, New York, US
- Died: December 1, 1915 (aged 66); Norwalk, Connecticut, US
- Known for: Photography
- Spouse: Frank Abernathy Wade (m. 1869)

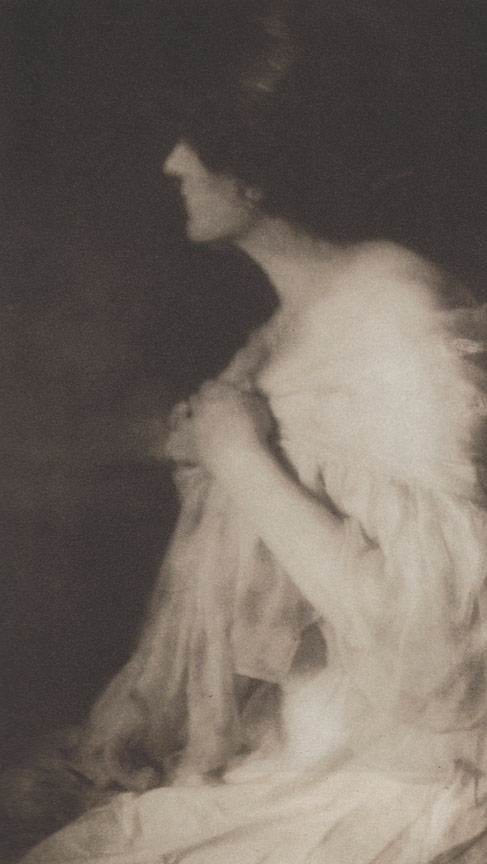
"Miss M., of Washington", by Rose Clark and Elizabeth Flint Wade. Photogravure published in Camera Notes, Vol 4 No 4, 1901

Elizabeth Flint Wade (1849–1915) was an early 20th-century American author, poet and pictorial photographer. She is best known for the photographs she exhibited with Rose Clark under their joint names, either as "Rose Clark and Elizabeth Flint Wade" or as "Misses Clark and Wade."

== Life ==
Wade was born in Cassville, New York, on 29 October 1849. Her parents were George Barnett Flint and Elizabeth Tracy Avery.

She married Frank Abernathy Wade (1836 -1906), the widower of her first cousin, on 24 November 1869 in Buffalo. They had two daughters, Blanche Elizabeth (1872-1928) and Frances "Frankie" A. (1879-1879), and two sons, Frank Kellogg (1874-1937) and Herman Avery (1876-?).

Wade’s interest in photography developed sometime before 1890. In 1893, she wrote an article called "Artistic Pictures, Suggestions on How to Make Them" in American Amateur Photographer. In the late 1890s, she was put in charge of Harper's Magazine Round Table Camera Club, and in 1900 Harpers Bazaar began publishing a series of her articles on photography.

In 1906, Wade was listed in an article in Photo-Era as "among those in the professional ranks achieving success". Other women mentioned were Gertrude Käsebier, Eva Watson-Schütze, and Jessie Tarbox Beals.

Wade was a respected writer and poet, and her stories and poems appeared in Atlantic Monthly, Collier's Weekly, Black Cat, Herald, New York World, The Catholic Telegraph, and Everybody's. She also frequently wrote about photography in magazines such as the American Amateur Photographer, Photo-Era, Photographic Times, Photo-American, and Harper's Magazine. From 1910 to 1912, she was associate editor of Photo-Era, and she critiqued many prints submitted by readers.

Wade died in her home in Norwalk, Connecticut, on 1 December 1915.
