= List of Camera Work issues =

Camera Work is a journal featuring modern art and criticism that was published by Alfred Stieglitz between 1902 and 1917 as part of his efforts to promote fine art photography and modern painting and sculpture.

The journal initially focused on a genre of photography known as Pictorialism by featuring a group of artists promoted by Stiegltiz as the Photo-Secession. As Stieglitz' interests expanded beyond photography, Camera Work published some of the earliest printed discussions and reproductions of work by Picasso, Cezanne, Matisse, and Rodin.

No.	Date	Images By	Articles
1	January 1903	Gertrude Käsebier, Alfred Stieglitz, Arthur Radclyffe Dugmore, Dwight William Tryon, Pierre Puvis de Chavannes.	Review of the 1902 London Photographic Salon produced by The Linked Ring.
2	April 1903	Edward Steichen	Charles Henry Caffin on Edward Steichen.
3	July 1903	Clarence Hudson White, Ward Muir, J. C. Strauss, Joseph Keiley, Alfred Stieglitz, Alvin Langdon Coburn, Mary Cassatt, Eugène Boudin.	Charles Henry Caffin on Clarence White.
4	October 1903	Frederick H. Evans, Alfred Stieglitz, Arthur F. Becher.	George Bernard Shaw on F. H. Evans.
5	January 1904	Robert Demachy, Prescott Adamson, and Frank Eugene.	Joseph Keiley on Robert Demachy.
6	April 1904	Alvin Langdon Coburn, Will A. Cadby, W. B. Post	Charles Henry Caffin on Alvin Langdon Coburn.
7	July 1904	Theodor and Oscar Hofmeister, Robert Demachy, Edward Steichen, Mary Devens.	Ernst Juhl on the Hofmeisters.
8	October 1904	James Craig Annan, Alvin Langdon Coburn, F. H. Evans, J. B. Kerfoot.	Joseph Keiley on James Craig Annan.
9	January 1905	Clarence Hudson White, Edward Steichen, Eva Watson-Schütze.	Joseph Keiley on Eva Watson-Schütze; John W. Beatty on Clarence White.
10	April 1905	Gertrude Käsebier, C. Yarnall Abbott, E. M. Bane, Outamaro, and Thomas Dewing.	Charles Fitzgerald on Edward Steichen.
11	July 1905	David Octavius Hill, Edward Steichen, Robert Demachy, and Alfred Horsley Hinton.	James Craig Annan on David Octavius Hill.
12	October 1905	Alfred Stieglitz, F. Benedict Herzog.	Roland Rood on The Evolution of Art from Writing to Photography.
13	January 1906	Hugo Henneberg, Heinrich Kühn, Hans Watzek, Edward Steichen poster of Photo-Secession.	F. Mathies-Masuren on Hugo Henneberg, Heinrich Kühn, and Hans Watzek.
14	April 1906	Edward Steichen.	George Bernard Shaw on the London Photographic Exhibitions.
14s	April 1906	Edward Steichen, "Steichen Supplement" special issue.	Maurice Maeterlinck, "Art's First Steps toward an Important Evolution".
15	July 1906	Alvin Langdon Coburn, George Bernard Shaw, Edward Steichen, George Henry Seeley.	George Bernard Shaw on Alvin Langdon Coburn.
16	October 1906	Robert Demachy, Constant Puyo, René Le Bègue.	Joseph Keiley on The Photo-Secession Exhibition at the Pennsylvania Academy of Fine Arts.
17	January 1907	Joseph Keiley, F. Benedict Herzog, Harry Cogswell Rubincam, Arthur Radclyffe Dugmore, James Montgomery Flagg.	Charles Henry Caffin on F. Benedict Herzog.
18	April 1907	George Davison, Sarah Choate Sears, William B. Dyer.	Robert Demachy on "modified" prints, answered by George Bernard Shaw.
19	July 1907	James Craig Annan, Edward Steichen.	Robert Demachy on the "Straight Print".
20	October 1907	George Henry Seeley, Alfred Stieglitz, W. Renwick.	Alfred Stieglitz on color photography; Joseph Keiley on Gertrude Käsebier.
21	January 1908	Alvin Langdon Coburn	(unsigned) "Is Photography a New Art?"; Charles Caffin. Delay of a color issue explained.
22	April 1908	Edward Steichen	Edward Steichen, "Color Photography ".
23	July 1908	Clarence White	Charles Caffin on Clarence White and George Henry Seeley exhibition; reprints of critics on Henri Matisse exhibition.
24	October 1908	Adolph de Meyer, William F. Wilmerding, Guido Rey.	George Besson interviews Auguste Rodin and Henri Matisse about Pictorial photography.
25	January 1909	Anne Brigman, Emma Spencer; C. Yarnall Abbott, Frank Eugene.	Charles Caffin, "Henri Matisse and Isadora Duncan".
26	April 1909	Alice Boughton, James Craig Annan, George Davison.	Benjamin De Casseres, "Caricature and New York".
27	July 1909	Herbert C. French, Clarence White and Alfred Stieglitz.	H. G. Wells, "On Beauty", Benjamin De Casseres on Pamela Colman Smith; Charles Caffin on Adolph de Meyer and Alvin Langdon Coburn.
28	October 1909	David Octavius Hill, George Davison, Paul Haviland, Marshall R. Kernochan, Alvin Langdon Coburn.	Charles Henry Caffin on Edward Steichen's pictures of Rodin's Balzac.
29	January 1910	George Henry Seeley, Marius de Zayas.	Julius Meier-Graefe on Henri de Toulouse-Lautrec lithographs.
30	April 1910	Frank Eugene, Marius de Zayas	Charles Henry Caffin on Edward Steichen; New York critics on Edward Steichen, John Marin, and Henri Matisse.
31	July 1910	Frank Eugene	Sadakichi Hartmann on Marius de Zayas.
32	October 1910	James Craig Annan, Clarence White, Alvin Langdon Coburn, Henri Matisse, Gordon Craig.	Articles by Sadakichi Hartmann, James Craig Annan, and Benjamin De Casseres.
33	January 1911	Heinrich Kuhn	Charles Henry Caffin, Joseph Keiley, and Alvin Langdon Coburn, on recent shows.
34-35	Apr/July 1911	Edward Steichen, Auguste Rodin	Benjamin De Casseres; Agnes Ernst Meyer; Sadakichi Hartmann on Auguste Rodin; Charles Henry Caffin on Paul Cézanne; Marius de Zayas on Pablo Picasso.
36	October 1911	Alfred Stieglitz, Pablo Picasso.	Benjamin De Casseres and Alvin Langdon Coburn on art topics.
37	January 1912	David Octavius Hill (and Robert Adamson).	Archibald Henderson on George Bernard Shaw; Charles Henry Caffin on Adolph de Meyer.
38	April 1912	Anne Brigman, Karl Struss.	Sadakichi Hartmann on motion pictures.
39	July 1912	Paul Haviland, Harold Mortimer-Lamb, John Marin, Manuel Manolo, Marius de Zayas.	Excerpts from Wassily Kandinsky's "On the Spiritual in Art"; J. Nilsen Laurvik on John Marin.
39s	August 1912	Henri Matisse, Pablo Picasso.	Gertrude Stein, "Henri Matisse" and "Pablo Picasso" (first publication of her work in the United States).
40	October 1912	Adolph de Meyer.	John Galsworthy and Hutchins Hapgood on art topics.
41	January 1913	Julia Margaret Cameron, Alfred Stieglitz.	Marius de Zayas on art topics.
42-43	Apr 1913	Edward Steichen	Marius de Zayas on photography.
42-43s	June 1913	Paul Cézanne, Vincent van Gogh, Pablo Picasso, Francis Picabia.	Gertrude Stein, "Portrait of Mabel Dodge at the Villa Curonia"; Mabel Dodge, Gabrielle Buffet, Francis Picabia, and Benjamin De Casseres on art.
44	October 1913	Edward Steichen; Alfred Stieglitz; Anne Brigman; Abraham Walkowitz.	Marius de Zayas on modern art; Oscar Florianus Bluemner on Abraham Walkowitz.
45	January 1914	James Craig Annan	Mabel Dodge on Marsden Hartley; Gertrude Stein, "From a Play by Gertrude Stein on Marsden Hartley".
46	April 1914	Paul Haviland, Frederick H. Pratt, Marius de Zayas.	Paul Haviland on Marius de Zayas.
47	July 1914	No illustrations.	Alfred Stieglitz, "What is 291?"; Replies from Camera Work contributors and others.
48	October 1916	Frank Eugene, Paul Strand, Arthur Allen Lewi, Francis Bruguière, Alfred Stieglitz.	Review of Georgia O'Keeffe show; Marsden Hartley on Alfred Stieglitz"
49-50	June 1917	Paul Strand	Paul Strand, "Photography"; W. Murrell Fisher on Georgia O'Keeffe.
