= 291 (art gallery) =

Art gallery in New York City, USA (1905–1917)

Coordinates: 40°44′47.21″N 73°59′09.79″W

- Type: Art gallery
- Founded: 1905 (121 years ago)
- Founder: Alfred Stieglitz
- Defunct: 1917 (109 years ago)
- Headquarters: 291 Fifth Avenue, New York City), United States

291 is the commonly known name for an internationally famous art gallery that was located in Midtown Manhattan at 291 Fifth Avenue in New York City from 1905 to 1917. Originally called the "Little Galleries of the Photo-Secession", the gallery was established and managed by photographer Alfred Stieglitz.

The gallery is recognized for two achievements: First, its exhibitions helped bring art photography to the same stature in America as painting and sculpture. Pioneering artistic photographers such as Stieglitz, Edward Steichen, Alvin Langdon Coburn, Gertrude Käsebier and Clarence H. White all gained critical recognition through exhibitions at 291. Equally important, Stieglitz used this space to introduce to the United States some of the most avant-garde European artists of the time, including Henri Matisse, Auguste Rodin, Henri Rousseau, Paul Cézanne, Pablo Picasso, Constantin Brâncuși, Marcel Duchamp, and the Dadaist Francis Picabia.

== Background ==
At the beginning of the 20th century photography's place in the world of fine art was still very indefinite. Although there had been major exhibitions of photography in the Europe and in the U.S., all of them had been judged by painters and sculptors. Photographers were not considered "real" artists, even though many photographers had won awards in international salons. Stieglitz himself had won over 150 awards throughout the world by the end of the 1890s.

Stieglitz had hoped to elevate the position of photography by convincing the New York Camera Club to allow him to put together a panel of photographers who would then be the sole judges of a photography competition. After more than a year of arguing with the directors of the Camera Club, many of whom did not have any passion for photography as art, Stieglitz gave up and began looking for other forums.

In late 1900 he met Edward Steichen, who had been trained as a painter but who had also taken up photography. Steichen shared the enthusiasm and passion of Stieglitz, and soon the two were planning how to change the course of photography in America. By the following year they had conceived of a great exhibition of photography, the first to be judged by photographers themselves, and had found a venue at the National Arts Club in New York. In March 1902, an exhibition of "American Pictorial Photography, arranged by The Photo-Secession" opened to critical acclaim. Moreover, Stieglitz had met his goal of having a show judged by photographers since, in spite of the title of the show, by all accounts he was the sole person responsible for selecting the exhibitors.

The following year Stieglitz further cemented his reputation as the leading proponent of fine art photography by launching the famed journal Camera Work with the assistance of his friend and fellow photographer Joseph Keiley. He expected that Camera Work would soon not only be funded completely by its subscribers but that additional income from the sales of the journal would allow him to further promote "photography as a medium of individual expression." While the journal give him a respected forum for showcasing pictorial photography and for publishing his viewpoints, it was not a financial success. Rather than be daunted by this setback, Stieglitz became even more convinced that he would succeed in convincing the art world of the rightful place of photography if he could only find the right platform for his message.

By the end of 1904 Stieglitz was in a difficult position. Curtis Bell, president of the American Federation of Photography and an outspoken critic of Stieglitz, organized an exhibition called "The First American Photographic Salon" at the Clausen Galleries in New York. It was judged by a jury of eminent American painters, including William Merritt Chase and Robert Henri, which gave it considerable standing in the art world. Stieglitz and other photographers saw it as a direct challenge to Stieglitz's reputation, which it was clearly intended to be.

Stieglitz countered this move by trying to get some of the best known photographers of Europe to join him as part of a united front. He traveled to London to meet with some of the founders of the important photographic group The Linked Ring, including J. Crag Annan, Frederick H. Evans, Alvin Langdon Coburn and Alfred Horley Hinton. He was hoping to convince them to start a chapter of the Linked Ring in the United States, which he would direct. He also met with playwright George Bernard Shaw, who was an avid amateur photographer, about ways to promote photography as an art form. Stieglitz took ill before any of these conversations led to anything, and he had to return home. He was tired, frustrated and seeking a definitive new way to carry out his mission of promoting photography for photography's sake – independent of any other art form.

== The Little Galleries of the Photo-Secession (1905–1908) ==
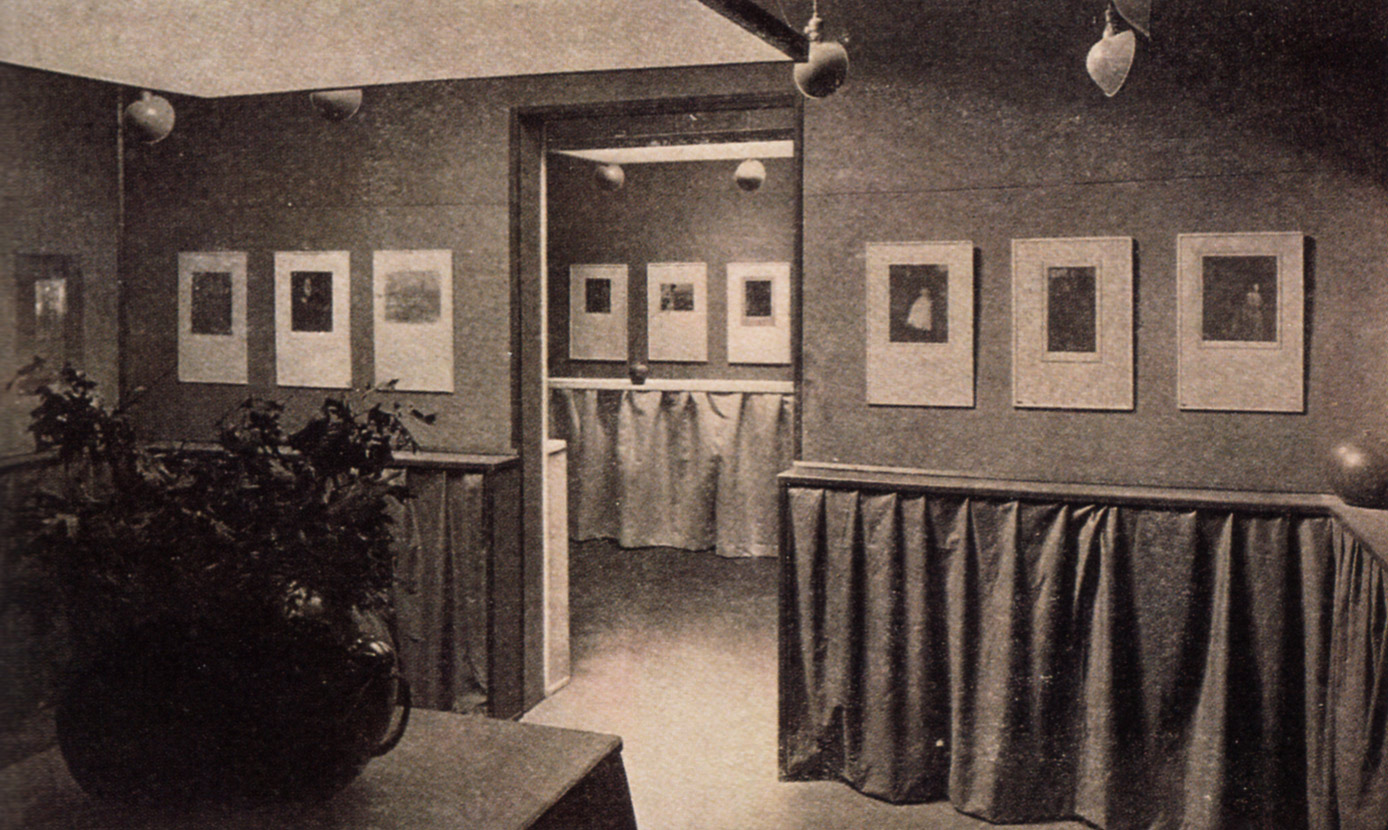
View of the Gertrude Käsebier and Clarence H. White exhibition at the Little Galleries of the Photo Secession, 1906 (published in Camera Work, No. 14, 1906)

When Stieglitz returned to New York in 1905 Edward Steichen was living in a studio apartment on the top (fifth) floor of a small building at 291 Fifth Avenue, between 30th and 31st Streets on the East side of the avenue. Steichen noticed that some rooms across from him were vacant, and he soon convinced Stieglitz that they would make a perfect space to exhibit photography and in particular the works of the Photo-Secession. Stieglitz, who was still dejected from his trip to Europe, was reluctant at first, but Steichen persisted. By summer Stieglitz signed a one-year lease for three small rooms that would soon become one of the most famous art galleries in the world. The two of them began planning how to use the new space most effectively, not only as a gallery but as an educational facility for artists and photographers and as a meeting place for art lovers.

In October, 1905, Stieglitz sent a letter to all members of the Photo-Secession, saying:

The Council of the Photo-Secession had planned to hold in the City of New York, early next spring, an exhibition consisting of the very best that has been accomplished in pictorial photography throughout the world, from the time of Hill, the father of pictorial photography, up to date. Many of the prints had been selected for this purpose, but owing to the impossibility of securing at any price adequate gallery accommodations during the desirable New York season, this exhibition must be deferred.

The Photo-Secession, for the present thus unable to hold the proposed big exhibition, has determined to present in detail some of the work which had already been selected and which would have been embraced therein, and for that purpose has leased rooms at 291 Fifth Avenue, New York City, where will be shown continuous fortnightly exhibitions of from thirty to forty prints each. These small but very select shows will consist not only of American pictures never before publicly shown in any city in this country, but also Austrian, German, British, French and Belgian photographs as well as such other art productions, other than photographic, as the Council of the Photo-Secession can from time to time secure.

It is planned to make these rooms headquarters for all Secessionists and to open them to the public generally".

Stieglitz and Steichen had planned the gallery as a commercial space, saying that it would "negotiate sales in behalf of owners of picture exhibited, charging a commission of 15 percent for the benefit of the Photo-Secession treasury." This premise is thought to have been pushed by Steichen, who had a much better business sense, and over the years it became a point of contention between the two men. Stieglitz believed that it was better for an exhibited work to go to someone who appreciated it for its artistic merit rather than its investment potential, and he was known to have quoted wildly inconsistent prices for the same piece depending on what he perceived as the true interest of the potential purchaser.

On November 24, 1905, the Little Galleries of the Photo-Secession formally opened its doors, with almost no public notice. The opening was attended mainly by those members of the Photo-Secession who were in New York at the time. The first exhibit consisted of one hundred prints by Photo-Secession members, selected entirely by Stieglitz. Over the next few weeks hundreds of New Yorkers came to the gallery, and Stieglitz was once again elevated to the position of standard bearer of artistic photographer in America.

The opening show was followed in January, 1906, by one of French photographers, including Robert Demachy, Constant Puyo and René Le Bégue, all of whom showed prints made by the gum bichromate process. This was followed by a two-person show of the works of Gertrude Käsebier and Clarence H. White. Four more exhibitions were held in 1906, including one of British photographers, early prints by Steichen, a show devoted to German and Austrian photographers, and another exhibition of prints by members of the Photo-Secession.

After a highly successful first year, Stieglitz and Steichen felt that they had made their point about the stature of fine art photography. So confident were they of their success that their colleague Joseph Keily wrote "today in America the real battle for the recognition of pictorial photography is over. The chief purpose for which the Photo-Secession was established has been accomplished – the serious recognition of photography as an additional medium of pictorial expression." Ironically, Stieglitz began to feel that he had succeeded in transforming the Photo-Secession into something he once disliked – an established institution, set in its ways and complacent in its approach to art. If there was any truth to this statement it reflected directly back at Stieglitz since he was known for his authoritarian control of the Photo-Secession and in selecting what was exhibited at the gallery. Until now Stieglitz's discomfort was held in check by Steichen's more conservative nature, but in the summer of 1906 Steichen decided to move to Paris in order to devote more of his time to his photography and painting. Without Steichen's business eye watching over him, Stieglitz began to reclaim some of his radical roots.

Stieglitz decided to shake things up, and he did so by mounting the first non-photography show at the gallery in January, 1907. This is notable because it signaled the beginning of Stieglitz's role as a pioneer promoter of modern art in America. The show, drawings by artist Pamela Colman Smith, initially attracted little attention, but after a prominent critic praised the work it became the best attended exhibition to date. A substantial number of the works were sold, and interest in the show was so strong that it had to be extended eight days.

Stieglitz began planning for future non-photography shows, but for the remainder of 1907 the walls were filled with exhibits by such photographers as Adolf de Meyer, Alvin Langdon Coburn and, once again, members of the Photo-Secession.

In the meantime, Steichen had become friends with the famous sculptor Auguste Rodin in Paris, and he convinced Rodin to lend him some of his drawings for a show at the gallery in New York. The 1908 gallery season started with the show "Drawings by Auguste Rodin", the first exhibit in the United States of his works on paper. The show caused a significant amount of controversy in the press, with one critic saying "they are not the sort of thing to offer to public view even in a gallery."

Soon after that show ended Stieglitz was notified that the landlord wanted to double the rent and would require a four-year lease. At that time the Photo-Secession as a group had only a small income, no more than US$400 per year. In spite of minor successes, the original plan that membership fees and commissions would support the gallery had not been realized. Although he appealed to those members that he knew, the economy was in a significant downturn and no offers of assistance appeared. Since there was no other source of income, Stieglitz sadly went about closing the gallery. By April of that year the original gallery space had been emptied. It was immediately taken over by a ladies' tailor shop.

== 291 is born (1908) ==
Stieglitz thought that his gallery was finished, but unknown to him a recent acquaintance named Paul Haviland emerged from studies at Harvard, learned about the closure of the gallery, and used some of his family's wealth to sign a three-year lease for a small space directly across the hall from the old gallery. After some convincing by Haviland that the new space was workable, Stieglitz gathered some other friends and came up with additional funds for utilities, supplies, printing and framing.

The new gallery space, which measured only fifteen feet square, was actually located in the next building on the block at 293 Fifth Avenue. The wall between the two buildings had been removed during a previous renovation, however, so by all appearances the new gallery seemed to share the same address as the old one.

Perhaps to save money on printing and perhaps because of his affection for the old gallery, Stieglitz wanted the new address to remain "291". Both Haviland and he, however, agreed that the previous name of "Little Galleries of the Photo-Secession" was no longer appropriate. They wanted the new space to be about more than photography. Later, Stieglitz would write "We are dealing, not with a society, not with an organization, as much as with a movement. The Secession is not so much a school or a following as an attitude towards life; and its motto seems to be: 'Give every man who claims to have a message for the world a chance of being heard.'"

From thenceforth Stieglitz referred to the gallery as "291", without the street name or other descriptive title. However, some of the original members of the Photo-Secession did not appreciate the name change and especially the thinking that led to it. Stieglitz's old friends Gertrude Käsebier and Clarence H. White saw it as the last straw in a series of autocratic moves by Stieglitz, and soon a series of increasingly bitter arguments broke out among the three of them. At one point Stieglitz wrote "To my dismay, jealousies soon became rampant among photographers around me, an exact repetition of the situation I rebelled against at the Camera Club. Various Secessionists were in danger of harming not only each other but what I was attempting to build and demonstrate. I found, too, that the very institutionalism, commercialism and self-seeking I most opposed were actually favored by certain members." These differences of opinion were to increase over the next two years, exacerbated in part by Stieglitz's stubbornness and his refusal to include many of his long-time photographer friends in decisions about the direction of the new gallery.

Meanwhile, Steichen returned to the U.S. in February 1908 with a new group of photos for a show to be held at the gallery the following month. More importantly, he brought with him a group of prints lent to him by Henri Matisse, who at that time little known outside France. Stieglitz promptly assembled the prints for a show in the new space. It was the first show of any work by Matisse in the United States and the first one-man show for the artist outside of Paris, and it marked the turning point in the focus of the gallery. After this show, 291 was known much less for photography and much more as a leading force for modern art in America. Moreover, Stieglitz continued to make sure that the gallery was not just an exhibition space; he strongly believed in its original mission as being an educational facility and meeting place for those with avant-garde ideas. Describing the Matisse exhibition, he wrote "Here was the work of a new man, with new ideas – a very anarchist, it seemed, in art. The exhibition led to many heated controversies; it proved stimulating."

== At the forefront of modern art in New York (1909–12) ==
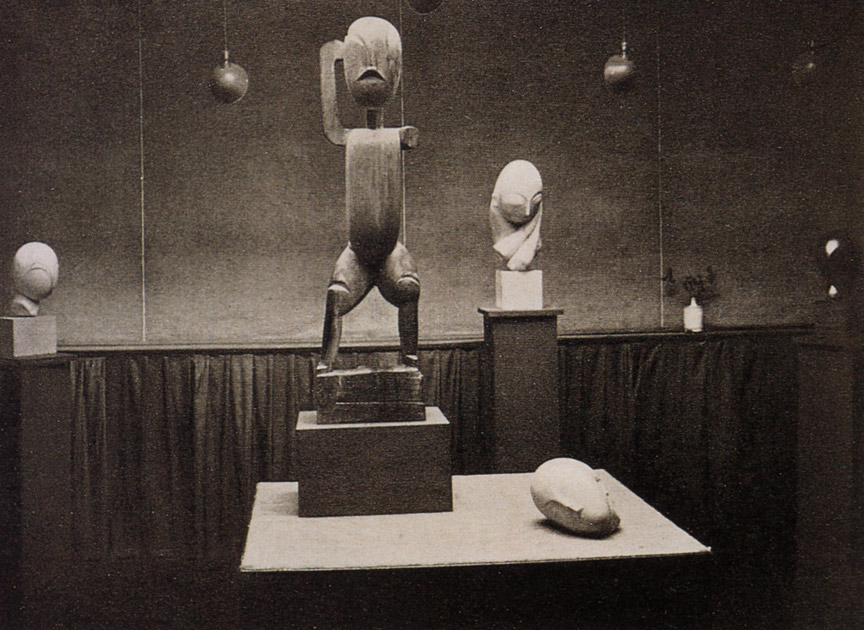
View of the Constantin Brâncuși exhibition at 291, 1914 (published in Camera Work, no. 48, 1916)

In addition to marking the beginning of a new path for 291, 1909 was significant for Stieglitz due to the death of his father in May. The two had not been particularly close, but in his will, Stieglitz's father left him the then substantial amount of $10,000. Stieglitz drew on this amount over the next several years to help keep 291 in business.

The new art and the public's reactions to it were very vitalizing to Stieglitz; it gave him a brand new set of admirers and followers at a time when he was feeling less and less connected to his old colleagues at the Photo-Secession. From then on, the course of the gallery was set. From 1909 until it closed in 1917, 291 featured only six shows of photography out of a total of 61 exhibitions held.

The change in the focus of the gallery led to a coalescence of group of intellectuals and artists who both sympathized with Stieglitz's aims and who themselves were invigorated by the atmosphere there. After the artistic success of the Matisse exhibit, the gallery took on a new life. On any given day, Stieglitz might have been surrounded by artists John Marin, Max Weber (artist), Arthur Dove, Marsden Hartley or Marius de Zayas; authors and art critics Sadakichi Hartmann and Benjamin De Casseres; financial supporters Paul Haviland and Agnes Ernst Meyer; and editors and collaborators Joseph Keiley and John Kerfoot.

De Zayas had both a passion and a vision that matched with Stieglitz's personality, and soon he was helping define what the aesthetics of this new generation of art would be. His work was exhibited at the gallery, he wrote several articles for Camera Work, and he introduced Stieglitz to some of the newest European artists by serving as a guide and interpreter when Stieglitz would travel to Europe. His interest in African tribal art and admiration for Picasso's Cubist work convinced Stieglitz to hold groundbreaking exhibitions of these subjects at 291.

For historical context, virtually no other galleries in the United States were showing works with such abstract and dynamic content at that time. Whether it was already controversial European artists like Picasso, Matisse or Cézanne, or relatively unknown but soon-to-be-famous Americans like Marin, Weber, Dove or Hartley, Stieglitz had both the aesthetic sense and the nerve to showcase individuals who are now acknowledged to have been at the forefront of modern art.

In fact, the more an artist confounded the public the more Stieglitz felt justified in his efforts. When he presented Picasso's first exhibit in this country in 1911, Stieglitz delighted in telling critics that the works they called “the gibberings of a lunatic” he found to be “as perfect as a Bach fugue.”

Among the significant exhibitions that took place during this period were first shows for Alfred Maurer, John Marin and Marsden Hartley, second shows of Rodin and Matisse, and important shows for newer artists Arthur Carles, Arthur Dove and Max Weber.

== Later years (1913–1917) ==
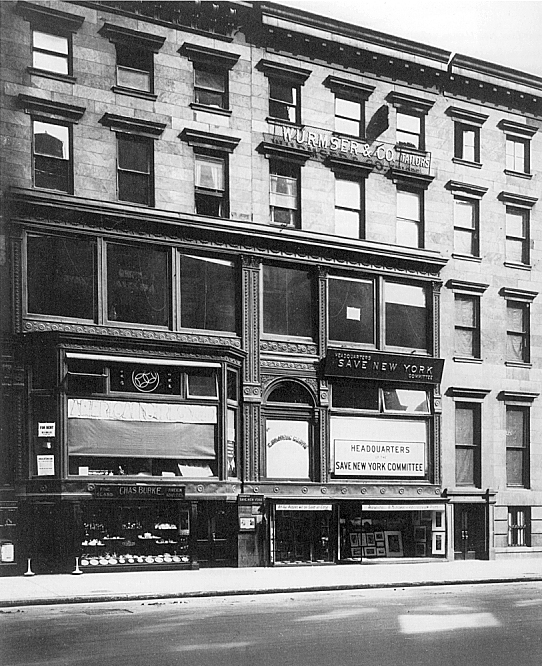
291 Fifth Avenue (right), 293 Fifth Avenue (left), before 1913

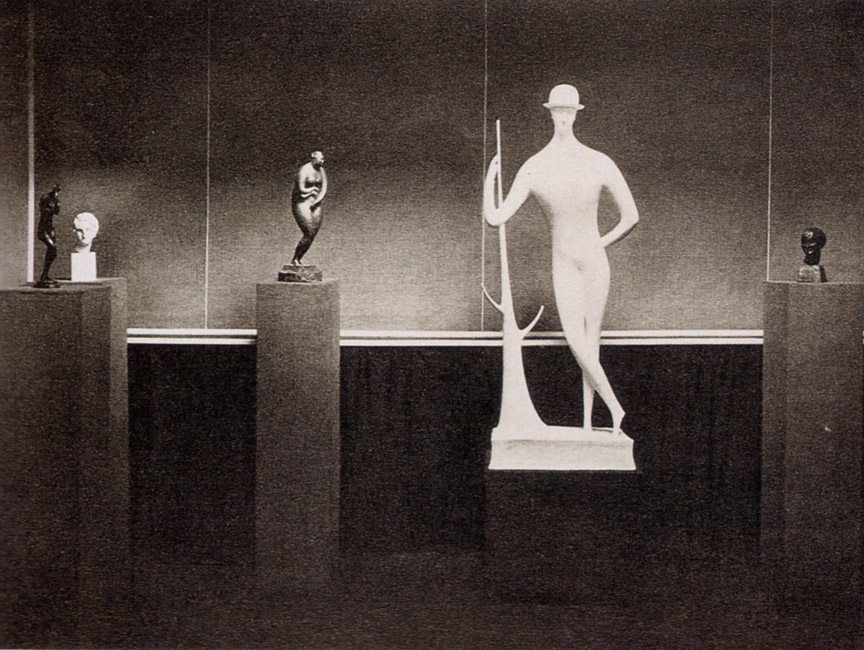
View of the Elie Nadelman exhibition at 291, 1915 (published in Camera Work, no. 48, 1916)

Starting in 1913 Stieglitz began to express an increasing amount of frustration over the changes that were happening in the world at that time. He wrote "Much of the enthusiasm that had existed at 291 gradually disappeared because of the coming war. Close friends seemed to fall by the wayside." Stieglitz was especially troubled because his parents came from Germany, and he still had many close friends there. While he did not sympathize with the German war efforts, he "could not see Germany as all wrong and the Allies as all right.". At the same time, because of the depressed economy attendance at the gallery sharply declined and subscriptions to Camera Work dropped off. To make matters even worse, the small corps of volunteer workers at the gallery all but disappeared as people joined the armed forces or had to take on other jobs to help make ends meet.

Once again it was Haviland who came to the rescue. In early 1915 he told Stieglitz that 291 was in a rut, and something bold was needed to bring it back again. He assembled a close circle of relatively well-off friends, including Agnes Meyer and Dorothy Norman, and together with Stieglitz they came up with the idea of publishing a new magazine. They decided that this time it would be not only a magazine about art but a work of art itself, printed in a limited edition with very high quality paper and reproductions. The new magazine, which they all agreed should be called 291, appeared in March, 1915, to critical acclaim. Twelve issues of 291 were printed over the next fourteen months, showcasing some of the most avant-garde art and design of the times.

The magazine did little to revive the status of the gallery. Stieglitz continued to present some outstanding shows, but the overall effect of the mounting war tension on the economy could not be overcome. In 1916 Stieglitz met Georgia O'Keeffe. In the early years of their relationship O'Keeffe was an inspiration for Stieglitz's photography and a source of creative energy. Other male gallery owners at this time did not commonly seek out or display women's artwork, however, Stieglitz's believed in the legitimacy of females as artists and included Georgia's work in many group exhibitions, and in individual exhibition of her work on April 3, 1917. However his advertisement of O'Keeffe's work at his gallery and his representation of her as an artist was in a large part for her femininity and its presence in her work.

In June, 1917, only two months after the United States declared war on Germany, Stieglitz closed 291. He made a photograph called The Last Days of 291 (National Gallery of Art, Alfred Stieglitz Collection) which symbolized his feelings at the time. It depicts a model of a young soldier, armed with a sword and a broom, protecting works of art behind him. To his side is an older, bandaged warrior looking on, possibly representing Stieglitz himself as someone who had been wounded in the battle to protect the art that must now be guarded by a new generation.

Later Stieglitz would return to New York to run two more galleries. From 1925 until 1929 he directed the Intimate Gallery, showcasing the work of American artists, including Marsden Hartley, Arthur Dove, John Marin, Paul Strand, Charles Demuth, and Georgia O'Keeffe, who by then had become his wife. In 1929 he opened "An American Place", where he presented the work of the Seven Americans (Hartley, Marin, Dove, Demuth, O'Keeffe, Strand and Stieglitz) until his death in 1946.

== The Essence of 291 ==
In 1914 Stieglitz published a series of responses to the question "What is 291?" in an issue of Camera Work. Here are some of those writings:

Eugene Meyer responded with a free-form poem. To him 291 represented:

An oasis of real freedom
A sturdy Islet of enduring independence in the besetting seas of Commercialism and Convention
A rest – when wearied
A stimulant – when dulled
A Relief
A Negation of Preconceptions
A Forum for Wisdom and for Folly
A Safety valve for repressed ideas
An Eye Opener
A Test –
A Solvent
A Victim and an Avenger

J. B. Kerfoot: "291 is greater than the sum of all its definitions. For it is a living force, working for both good and evil. To me, 291 has meant an intellectual antidote to the nineteenth century...":

William Zorach: "I have visited 291 very often and to me it is a wonderful living place palpitating with red blood – a place to which people bring their finest and that brings out the finest that is within all those that come into actual contact with it."

Marsden Hartley: "A pure instrument is certainly sure to give forth pure sound. So has this instrument of 291 kept itself pure as possible that it thereby gives out pure expression."

== Legacy ==
Over the gallery's 13-year existence, the exhibitions held there include a number of firsts in both photography and modern art.

- 1907: The first show of autochrome prints in the United States
- 1908: The first showing of Rodin's late pencil and watercolor figure drawings
- 1908: The first exhibition of Matisse's work ever held in the United States
- 1910: The first three lithographs made by Cézanne were shown
- 1911: The first U.S. one-person exhibition of Cézanne
- 1911: The first U.S. one-person exhibition of Picasso
- 1912: The world's first exhibition of Matisse's sculpture

In 1917, Francis Picabia founded the magazine 391 in Barcelona, the title inspired by 291.

== List of exhibitions ==
The definitive source book for 291 and the exhibitions held there is Sarah Greenough's massive Modern Art and America: Alfred Stieglitz and His New York Galleries (Washington: National Gallery of Art, 2000). This list is found on pp. 543–547.

1905	November 24 – January 4	Exhibition of members' work
1906	January 10–24	Exhibition of Work by French photographers
	February 5–19	Photographs by Gertrude Käsebier and Clarence White
	February 21 – March 7	First Exhibition of British photographers
	March 9–24	Photographs by Edward J. Steichen
	April 7–28	Viennese and German photographers
	November 10 – December 30	Exhibition of members' work
1907	January 5–24	Drawings by Pamela Colman Smith
	January 25 – February 12	Photographs by Baron A. De Meyer and George Seeley
	February 19 – March 5	Photographs by Alice Boughton, William B. Dyer, C. Yarnall Abbott
	March 11 – April 10	Photographs by Alvin Langdon Coburn
	November 18 – December 30	Exhibition of members' work
1908	January 2–21	Drawings by Auguste Rodin
	February 7–25	Photographs by George Seeley
	February 26 – March 11	Etchings and Book Plates by Willi Geiger, Etchings by D. S. McLauuhlan, Drawings by Pamela Coleman Smith
	March 12 – April 2	Photographs by Edward J. Steichen
	April 6–25	Drawings, lithographs, water colors, etchings by Henri Matisse
	December 8–30	Exhibition of members' work
1909	January 4–16	Caricatures in charcoal by Marius de Zayas and autochromes by J. Nilsen Laurvik
	January 18 – February 1	Photographs by Alvin Langdon Coburn
	February 4–22	Photographs in color and monochrome by Baron A. De Meyer
	February 26 – March 10	Etchings, Dry-points and bookplates by Allen Lewis
	March 17 – 27	Drawings by Pamela Coleman Smith
	March 30 – April 17	Sketches in oil by Alfred Maurer and water colors by John Marin
	April 21 – May 7	Photographs of Rodin's Balzac by Edward J. Steichen
	May 8 – May 18	Paintings by Marsden Hartley
	May 18 – June 2	Exhibition of Japanese Prints from the F. W. Hunter Collection, New York
	November 24 – December 17	Monotypes and drawings by Mr. Eugene Higgins
	December 20 – January 14	Lithographs by Henri de Toulouse-Lautrec
1910	January 21 – February 5	Color photographs by Edward J. Steichen
	February 7–19	Water colors, pastels, and etchings by John Marin
	February 23 – March 8	Drawings and Photographs of paintings by Henri Matisse
	March 9–21	Younger American Painters (included Arthur Dove, John Marin, Max Weber (artist) and Edward Steichen)
	March 21 – April 18	Drawings Auguste by Rodin
	April 26 – May	Caricatures by Marius de Zayas
	November 18 – December 8	Lithographs by Manet, Cézanne, Renoir, and Toulouse-Lautrec; drawings by Rodin; paintings and drawings by Henri Rousseau
	December 14 – January 12	Drawings and etchings by Gordon Craig
1911	January 11–31	Drawings and paintings by Max Weber
	February 2–22	Recent water colors by John Marin
	March 1–25	Water colors by Cézanne
	March 28 – April 25	Early and recent drawings and water colors by Pablo Picasso
	November 8 – December 17	Water colors by Gelett Burgess
	December 18 – January 15	Photographs by Baron A. De Meyer
1912	January 17 – February 3	Paintings by Arthur B. Carles
	February 7–26	Paintings and drawings by Marsden Hartley
	February 27 – March 12	Paintings and pastels by Arthur G. Dove
	March 14 – April 6	Sculpture and drawings by Henri Matisse
	April 11 – May 10	Drawings, water colors and pastels by children, aged two to eleven
	November 20 – December 12	Caricatures by Alfred J. Frueh
	December 15 – January 14	Drawings and paintings by Abraham Walkowitz
1913	January 20 – February 15	Water colors by John Marin
	February 24 – March 15	Photographs by Alfred Stieglitz
	March 17 – April 5	Exhibition of New York studies by Francis Picabia
	April 8 – May 20	Exhibition of caricatures by Marius de Zayas
	November 19 – January 3	Drawings, pastels and water colors by A. Walkowitz
1914	January 12 – February 14	Paintings by Marsden Hartley
	February 18 – March 11	Second exhibition of children's work
	March 12 – April 4	Sculpture by Constantin Brâncuși
	April 6 – May 6	Paintings and drawings by Frank Burty
	November 3 – December 8	African sculpture (titled "Statuary in Wood by African Savages")
	December 9 – January 11	Drawings and paintings by Picasso and Braque; Archaic Mexican pottery and carvings; Kalogramas by Torres Palomar of Mexico
1915	January 12 – 26	Recent paintings by Francis Picabia
	January 27 – February 22	Paintings by Marion H. Beckett and Katherine N. Rhoades
	February 23 – March 26	Oils, water colors. Etchings and drawings by John Marin
	March 27 – April 16	Third exhibition of children's drawings
	November 10 – December 7	Drawings and paintings by Oscar Bluemner
	December 8 – January 19	Sculpture and drawings by Elie Nadelman
1916	January 18 – February 12	Recent water colors by John Marin
	February 14 – March 12	Drawings and water colors by Abraham Walkowitz
	March 13 – April 3	Photographs by Paul Strand
	April 4 – May 22	Paintings by Marsden Hartley
	May 23 – July 5	Drawings by Georgia O'Keeffe, water colors and drawings by C. Duncan, oils by René Lafferty
	November 22 – December 20	Water colors and drawings by Georgia S. Engelhard of New York, a child ten years old; paintings and drawings by Hartley, Marin, Walkowitz, Wright and O'Keeffe
	December 17 – January 17	Water colors by A. Walkowitz
1917	January 22 – February 7	Marsden Hartley – recent work
	February 14 – March 3	Water colors by John Marin
	March 6–17	Paintings, drawings, pastels by Gino Severini
	March 20–31	Paintings and sculpture by Stanton Macdonald-Wright
	April 3 – May 14	Recent work by Georgia O'Keeffe

== See also ==
List of Camera Work issues
