= Charles Henry Caffin =

Anglo American writer entry ticket

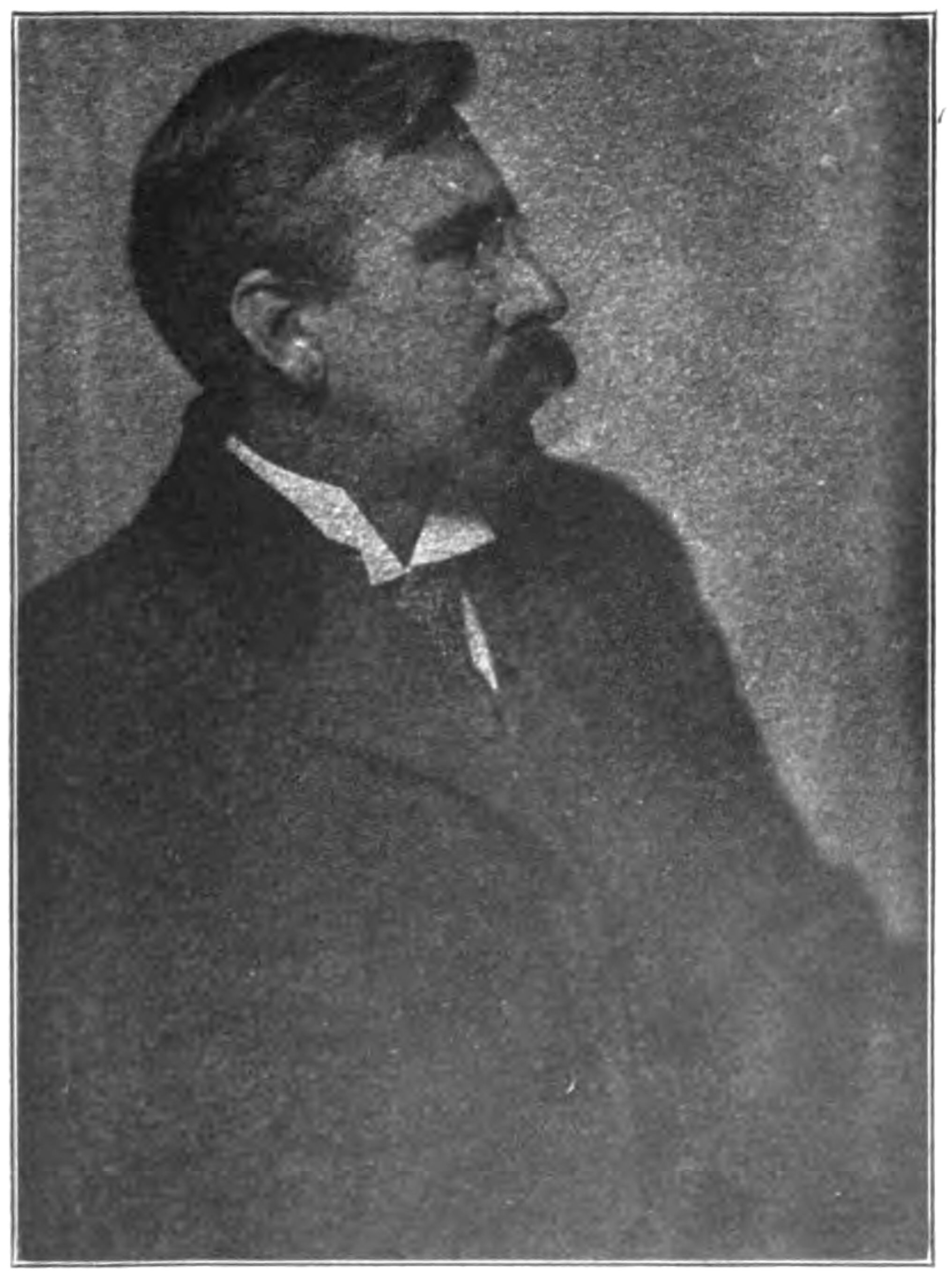
Charles H. Caffin ca. 1900

Charles Henry Caffin (June 4, 1854 – January 14, 1918) was an Anglo-American writer and art critic, born in Sittingbourne, Kent, England. After graduating from Magdalen College, Oxford, in 1876, with a broad background in culture and aesthetics, he engaged in scholastic and theatrical work. In 1888, he married Caroline Scurfield, a British actress and writer. They had two children, daughters Donna and Freda Caffin. In 1892, he moved to the United States. He worked in the decoration department of the Chicago Exposition, and after moving to New York City in 1897, he was the art critic of Harper's Weekly, the New York Evening Post, the New York Sun (1901–04), the International Studio, and the New York American. His publications are of a popular rather than a scholarly character, but he was an important early if equivocal advocate of modern art in America. His writings were suggestive and stimulating to laymen and encouraged interest in many fields of art. One of his last books, Art for Life's Sake (1913), described his philosophy, which argued that the arts must be seen as "an integral part of life....[not] an orchid-like parasite on life" or a specialized or elite indulgence. He also argued strenuously for art education in American elementary schools and high schools and was a frequent lecturer.

== Career ==
Caffin's earliest writings did not suggest that he would ever be sympathetic to the modernist attack on traditional aesthetic values. His many articles and books, which were surveys intended for a general audience, focused on the major names in seventeenth- and eighteenth-century European painting and sculpture, and when considering art from the late nineteenth century, praised the work of artists like Abbott Thayer and George de Forest Brush, who came to epitomize everything Modernism would reject. He was an admirer of Tonalism and the realism of Gari Melchers.

Caffin's interest in pictorial photography led to the most important and productive friendship of his life with Alfred Stieglitz. Stieglitz enlisted Caffin as a writer for his journal Camera Work, for which he wrote appreciations of Stieglitz's photographs as well as those of Edward Steichen, Frank Eugene, Joseph Keiley, and Gertrude Kasebier, among others. Camera Work, which was founded in 1902, continued publication until 1917 and, in the words of Stieglitz's biographer, Caffin was "the only major critic sympathetic to [Stieglitz's] goals to last the full life of the magazine." The relationship with Stieglitz also led to more exposure to new art. Reviewing exhibitions at Stieglitz's gallery, "291," Caffin had the opportunity to assess challenging artists as different as Abraham Walkowitz, Alfred Maurer, John Marin, Arthur Dove, and Marsden Hartley. Some of the new art he saw (e.g., Cubism and Synchromism) was confusing and disorienting to him, but much of it was a revelation which he was pleased to discuss in his newspaper and magazine columns.

Though he was always more comfortable writing about the Old Masters or painters from his youth like James Abbott McNeill Whistler, he acquired a reputation as a writer with an open mind. He could also acknowledge that his own perspective had changed over time. Examining a portrait by Thomas Wilmer Dewing at a 1916 exhibition at the Knoedler gallery, Caffin wrote, "It is with curious reflection that one studies its dead harmonies of color, its inert vibrations...and recalls that they once seemed to awaken a response in one's imagination...Poor old fin-de-siècle exquistiveness, how completely everybody but the artist has grown beyond you!"

Caffin had his enemies in the modernist camp, who could not forgive him his more conservative tastes. Willard Huntington Wright, an early advocate of abstract painting, found Caffin's growing interest in advanced art suspicious and suggested that hypnotism must be responsible for his conversion to a broader view, as "the headmaster in the kindergarten of painting" was not clever enough to see the light on his own. Another writer in the Stieglitz circle, Temple Scott, wrote an "histoire à clef" that offered a particularly unflattering portrait of Caffin, thinly disguised as "Charles Cockayne," a critic of complacent self-assurance.

In the years between the 1913 Armory Show, which he found impressive but dangerously sensationalistic, and his death in 1918, Caffin energetically covered the changing New York art world and urged his readers to give the difficult new painters a chance. He made a case to skeptical viewers for the work of European modernists like Henri Matisse, Constantin Brâncuși, and Francis Picabia. Yet he also shared his own doubts. While he could see the innovative qualities of Paul Cézanne and Georges Braque, he dismissed the "pinhead humor" of Marcel Duchamp and found the Coney Island paintings of Joseph Stella aggressively vulgar. Writing about a 1915 Picasso exhibition, he admitted that all artists must follow "the inevitable call of their own genius" but that Picasso "has reached a point of intentional abstraction which I, for one, cannot follow."

Charles Caffin was neither a reactionary opposed to Modernism nor an unabashed avant-garde supporter. Sharing his enthusiasm and his skepticism, he provided a forum for reasoned debate and applauded the testing of aesthetic boundaries and standards. He understood that he lived in changing times.

== Published works ==
- Handbook of the New Library of Congress, compiled by Herbert Small; with Essays on the Architecture, Sculpture and Painting by Charles Caffin (1897)
- Photography as a Fine Art (1901)
- American Masters of Painting (1902)
- American Masters of Sculpture (1903)
- How to Study Pictures by Means of a Series of Comparisons of Paintings and Painters (1905)
- Story of American Painting (1907)
- A Child's Guide to Pictures (1908)
- The Appreciation of the Drama (1908)
- The Art of Dwight W. Tryon (1909)
- The Story of Dutch Painting (1909)
- The Story of Spanish Painting (1910)
- A Guide to Pictures for Beginners and Students (1910)
- Story of French Painting (1911)
- Francisco Goya Lucientes (1912)
- Art for Life's Sake (1913)
- How to Study the Modern Painters (1914)
- How to Study the Old Masters (1914)
- The A.B.C. Guide to Pictures (1914)
- How to Study Architecture (1917)

== References and sources ==
Sources

- Brown, Milton. American Painting from the Armory Show to the Depression. Princeton: Princeton University Press, 1955.
- Johnson, Allen (ed). Dictionary of American Biography. New York: Charles Scribner's Sons, 1936.
- Loughery, "Charles Caffin and Willard Huntington Wright, Advocates of Modern Art," Arts Magazine (January 1985), pp. 103–109.
- Lowe, Sue Davidson. Stieglitz: A Memoir/Biography. New York: Farrar, Straus, Giroux, 1983.
