= George Seeley =

George Seeley may refer to:

- George Seeley (footballer) (1879–1921), English footballer
- George H. Seeley (1880–1955), American photographer
