= James Craig Annan =

Scottish-born photographer (1864–1946)

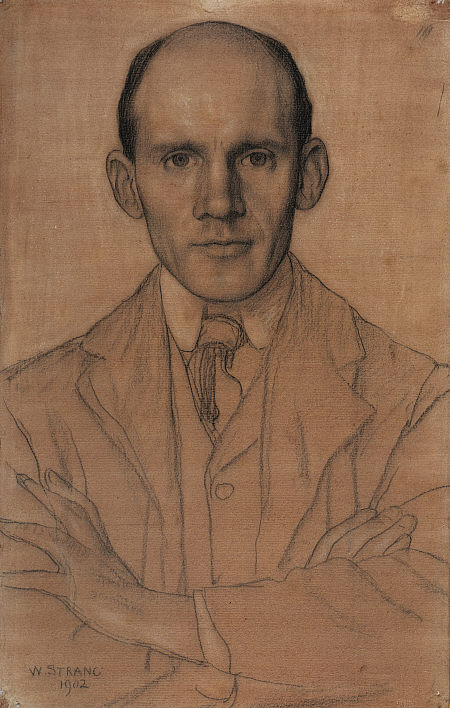
- James Craig Annan by William Strang (1902)
- Born: 1864; Hamilton, South Lanarkshire, Scotland
- Died: 1946 (aged 81–82); Lenzie, Scotland
- Occupation: Photographer
- Years active: c.1883 – 1946
- Known for: Photography
- Parents: Thomas Annan (father); Mary Young Craig (mother)

James Craig Annan (8 March 1864 – 5 June 1946) was a pioneering Scottish-born photographer and Honorary Fellow of the Royal Photographic Society.

== Early life and education ==
The second son of photographer Thomas Annan, James Craig Annan was born at Hamilton, South Lanarkshire, Scotland, on 8 March 1864. He was educated at Hamilton Academy before studying chemistry and natural philosophy at Anderson's College, Glasgow (later to merge to become the Glasgow and West of Scotland Technical College; later again, the Royal College of Science and Technology, and eventually becoming, in 1964, the University of Strathclyde.)

== Career ==
Annan subsequently joined his family's photographic business, T. & R. Annan and Sons of Glasgow, Hamilton and Edinburgh, and in 1883 went to Vienna to learn the process of photogravure from the inventor, Karel Klíč. He introduced the photogravure process into Britain, and T. & R. Annan, having acquired the British Patent holder rights, were to become the leading firm in Britain in gravure photographic printing.

In 1891 Annan was elected to membership of Glasgow Art Club as a "photographic artist." In 1893 he exhibited his own photogravure work at the Photographic Salon in 1893, as a result of which he was, in 1894, elected a member of The Linked Ring, a select international group of art photographers. The Linked Ring (also known as "The Brotherhood of the Linked Ring") was a photographic society created to propose and defend that photography was just as much an art as it was a science, motivated to propelling photography further into the fine art world. Members dedicated to the craft looked for new techniques that would cause less knowledgeable to steer away, persuading photographers and enthusiasts to experiment with chemical processes, printing techniques and new styles. He also gave lectures to the Edinburgh Photographic Society, on The Arts of Engraving (December 1901) and Photography as a Means of Artistic Expression (May 1910.) In 1900 the Royal Photographic Society invited Annan to mount a one-man show, the first in a series of such shows at the Society's new exhibition rooms on Russell Square, London, and he was subsequently awarded Honorary Fellowship of the Society.

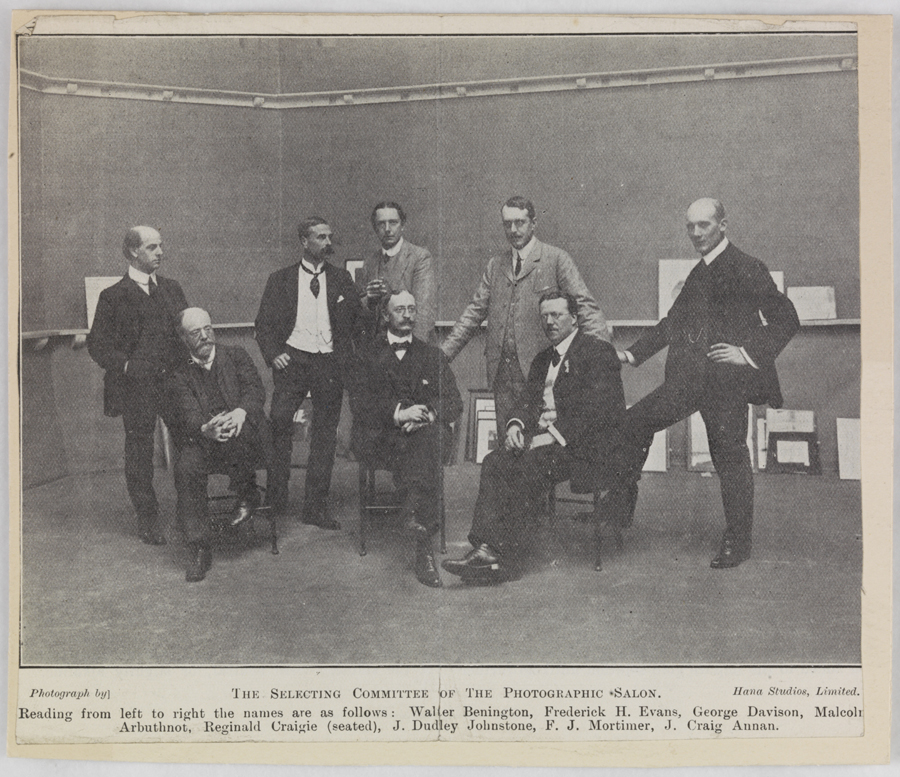
The Selecting Committee of the Photographic Salon of the Linked Ring (8386802526)

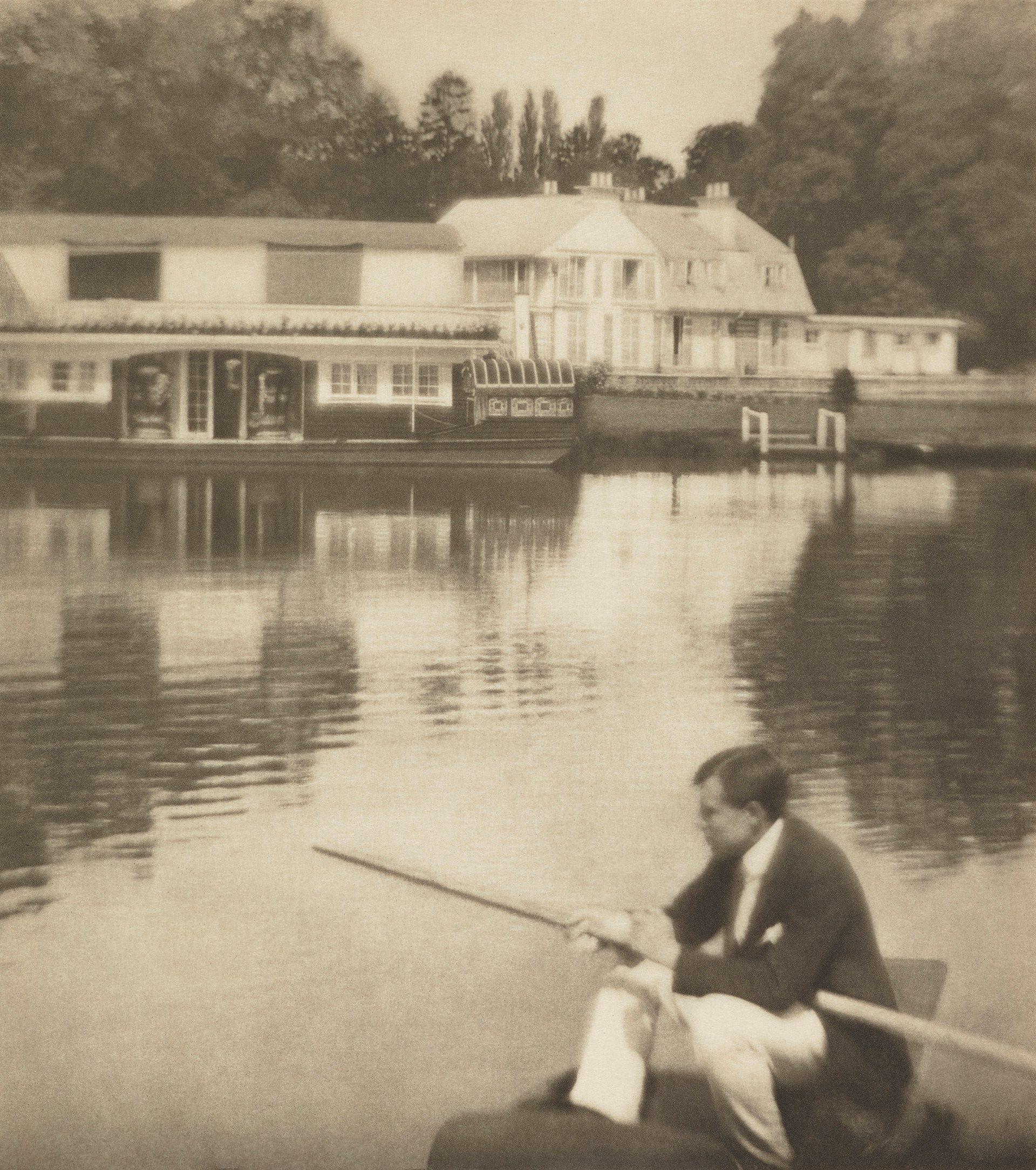
The White House from Camera Work

He exhibited further, at the Glasgow International Exhibition of 1901; the Paris Salon; the 1910 International Exhibition of Pictorial Photography at the Albright-Knox Art Gallery in Buffalo, New York and in 1904, the Royal Commission for the Saint Louis World's Fair chose Annan and Sir William Abney to represent Britain on the International Jury for Photography, Photo-process, and Photo-appliances.

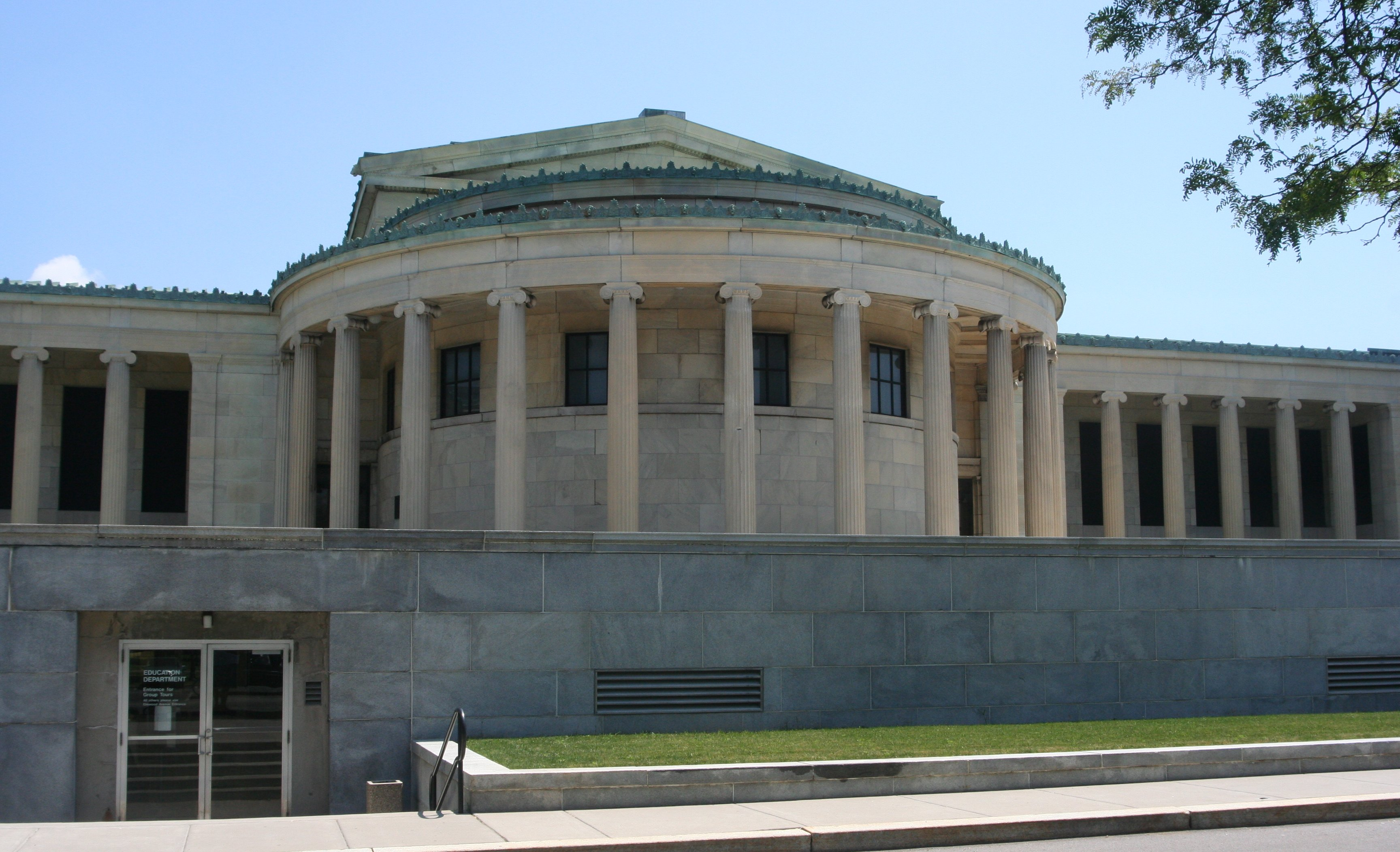
Albright-Knox Art Gallery, Buffalo, New York

Annan was to influence the development of photography in North America through having his work exhibited at Alfred Stieglitz's Photo-Secession Galleries in New York, and being featured in the American photographic periodical Camera Notes, published by The Camera Club of New York from 1897 to 1903 and of which Stieglitz was editor, and featured (1905,1909, 1912) in the quarterly photographic journal Camera Work (published by Stieglitz in New York between 1903 and 1917). Annan's photographic studio produced many of the photogravures featured in Camera Work.

In 1913, Annan visited Spain with his friend the artist William Strang, both producing landscape work.

James Craig Annan died at Lenzie, near Glasgow, on 5 June 1946.

== Gallery ==
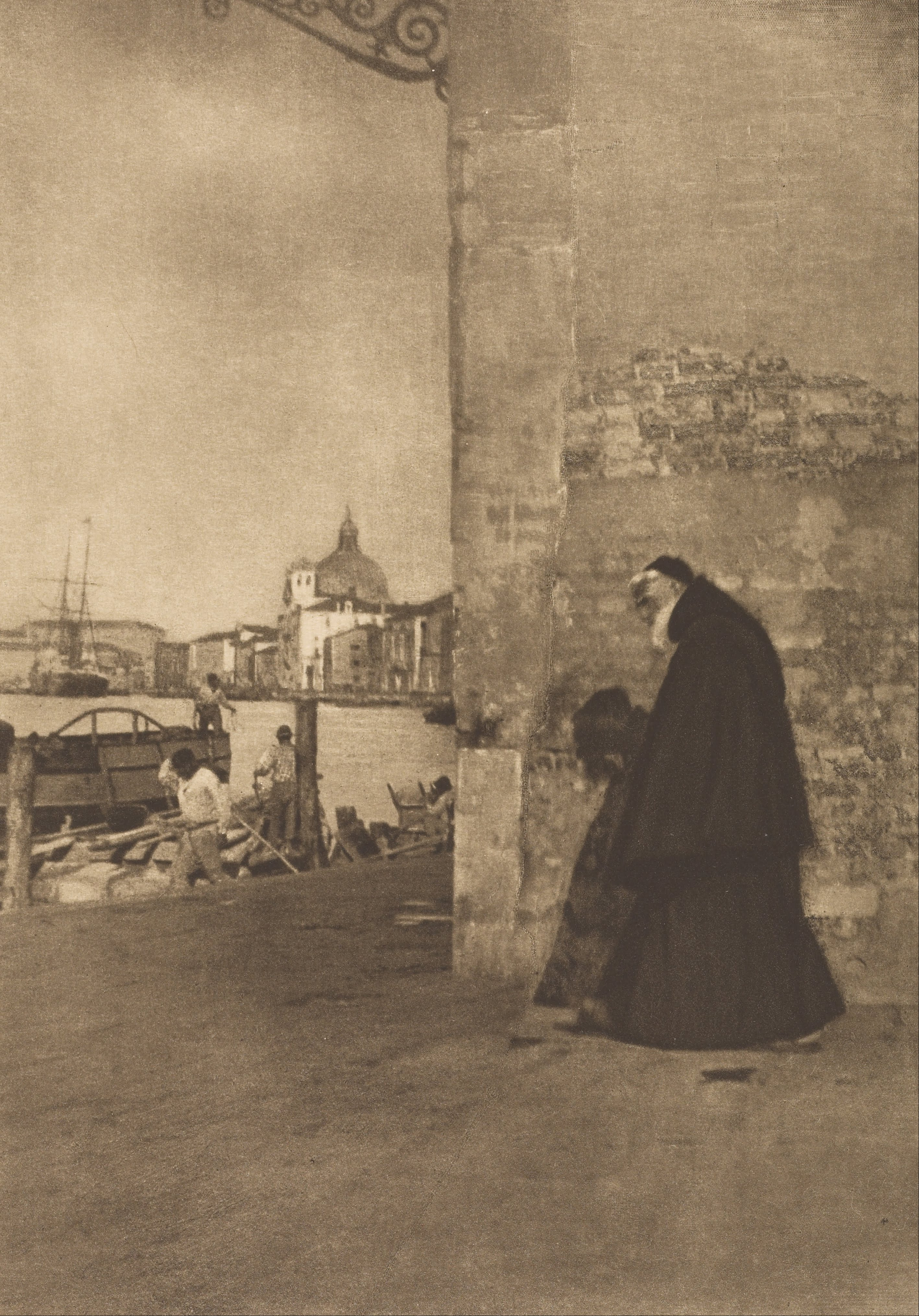
A Franciscan, Venice

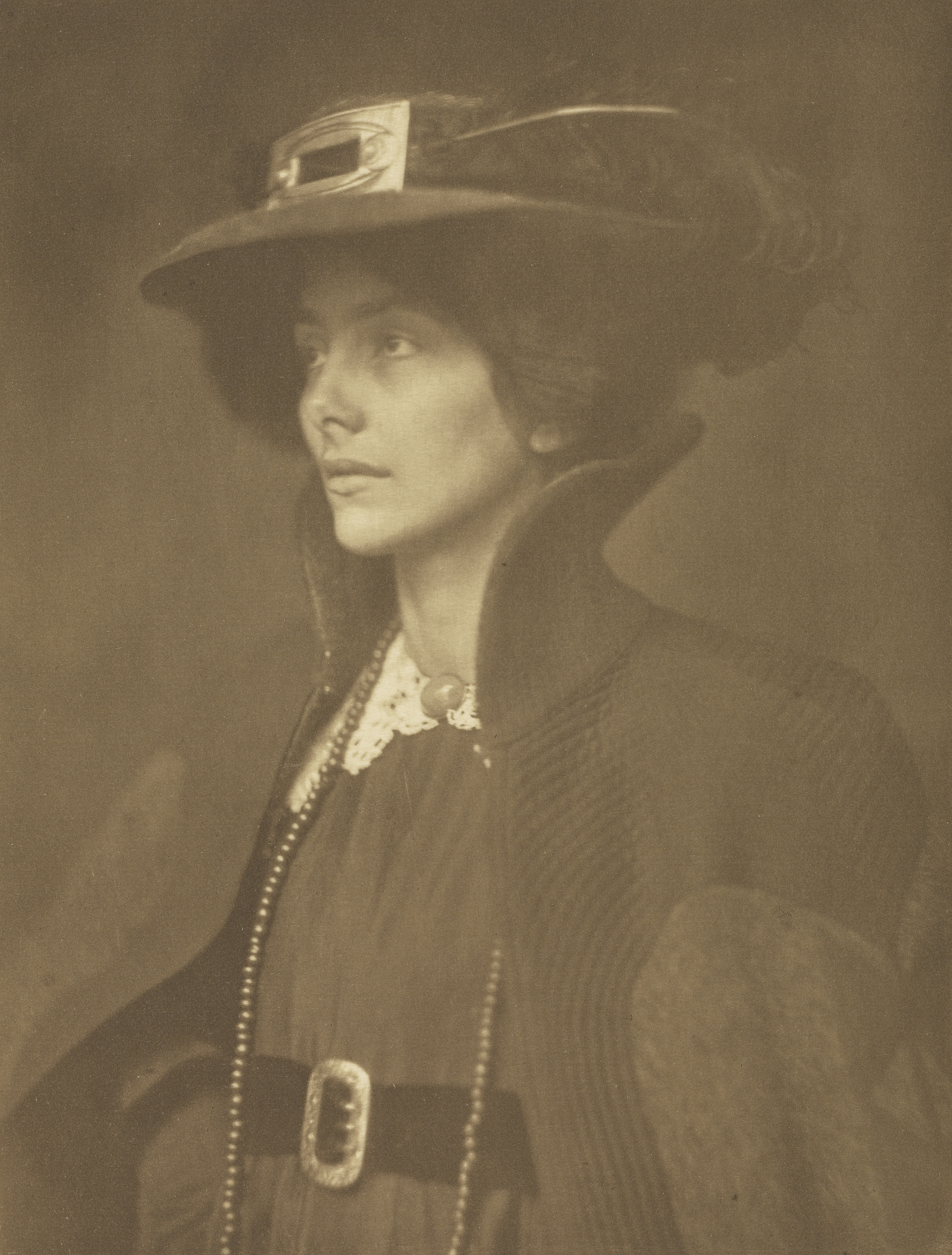
Frau Mathasius

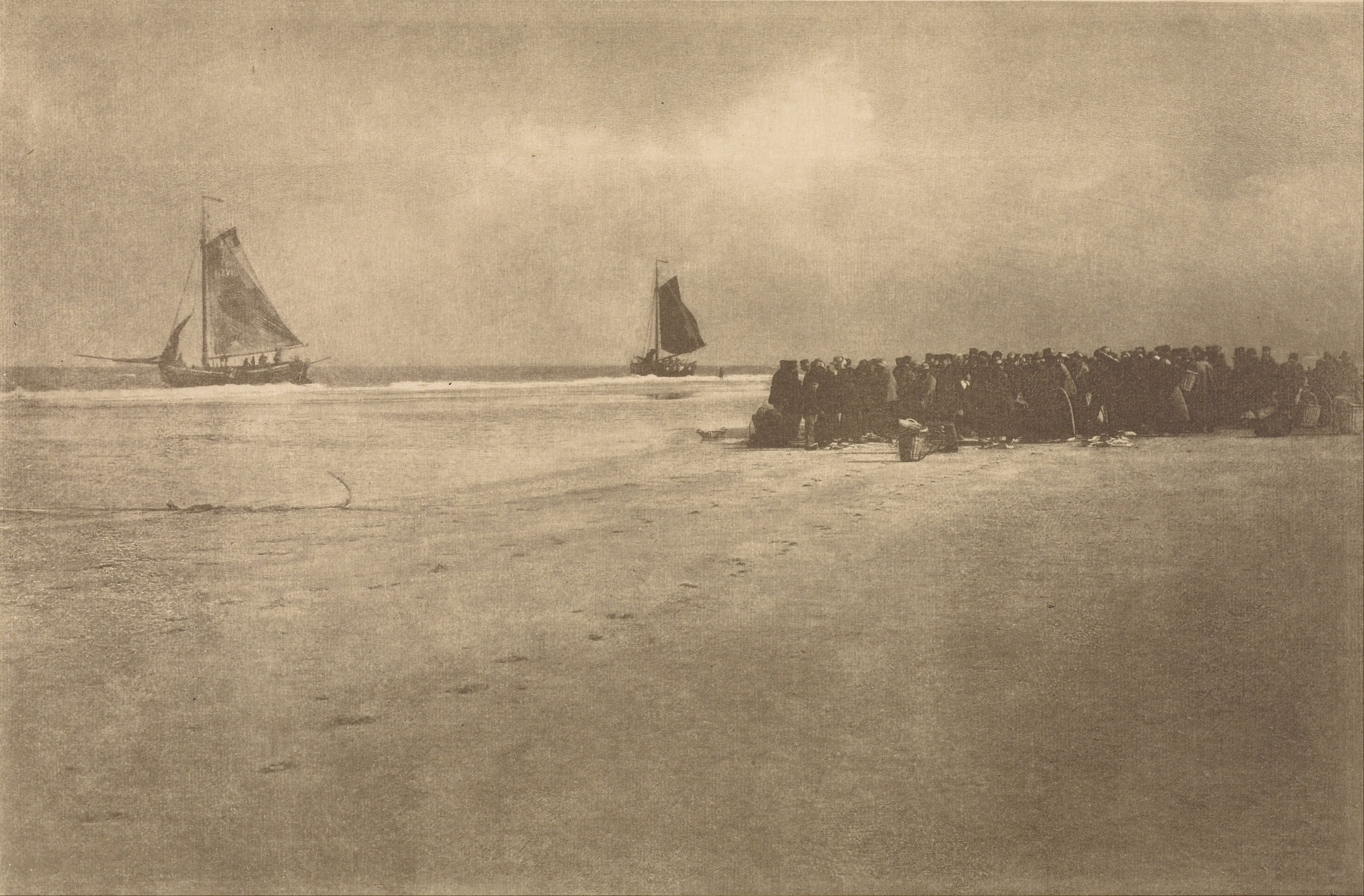
On a Dutch Shore

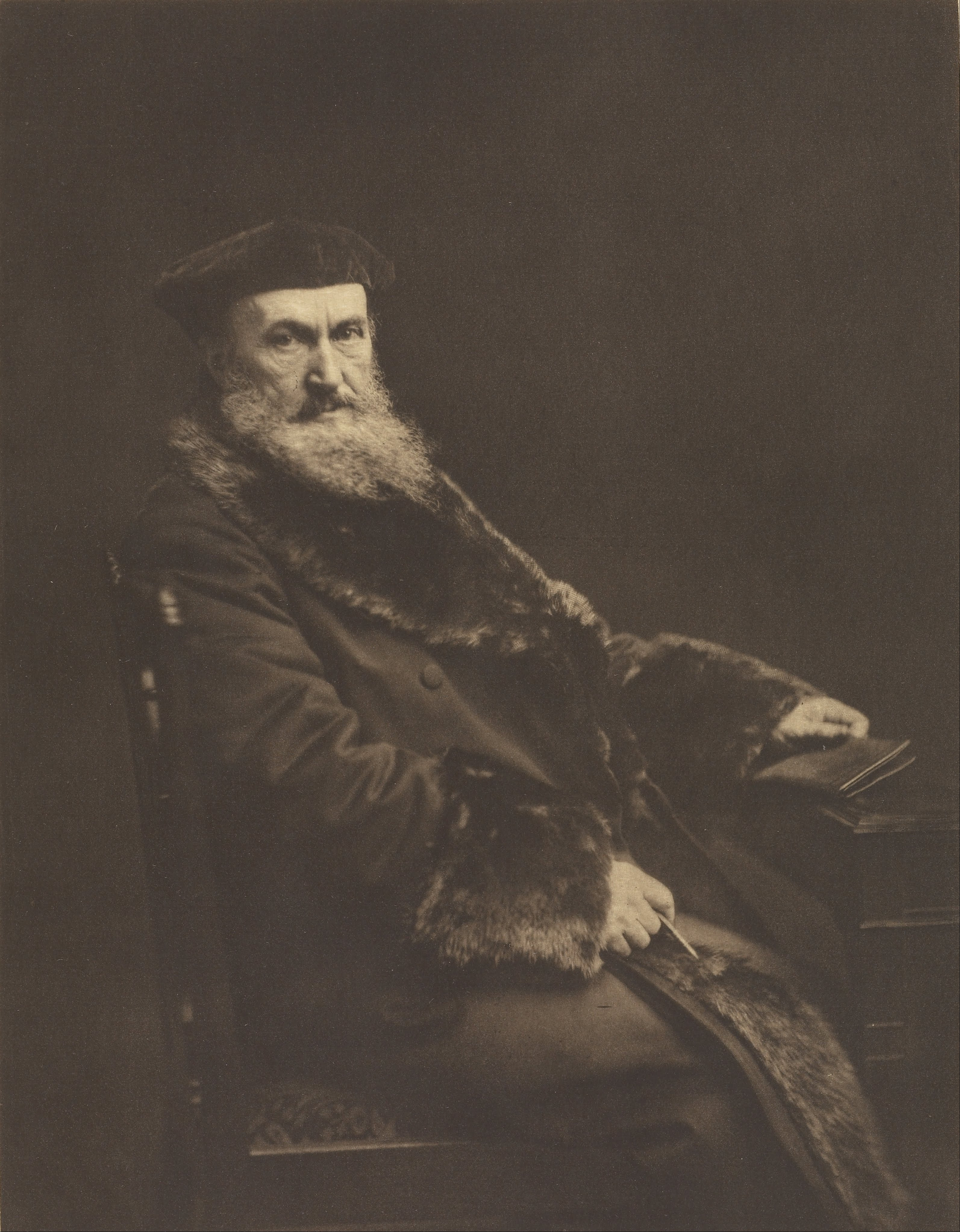
Prof. John Young, of Glasgow University

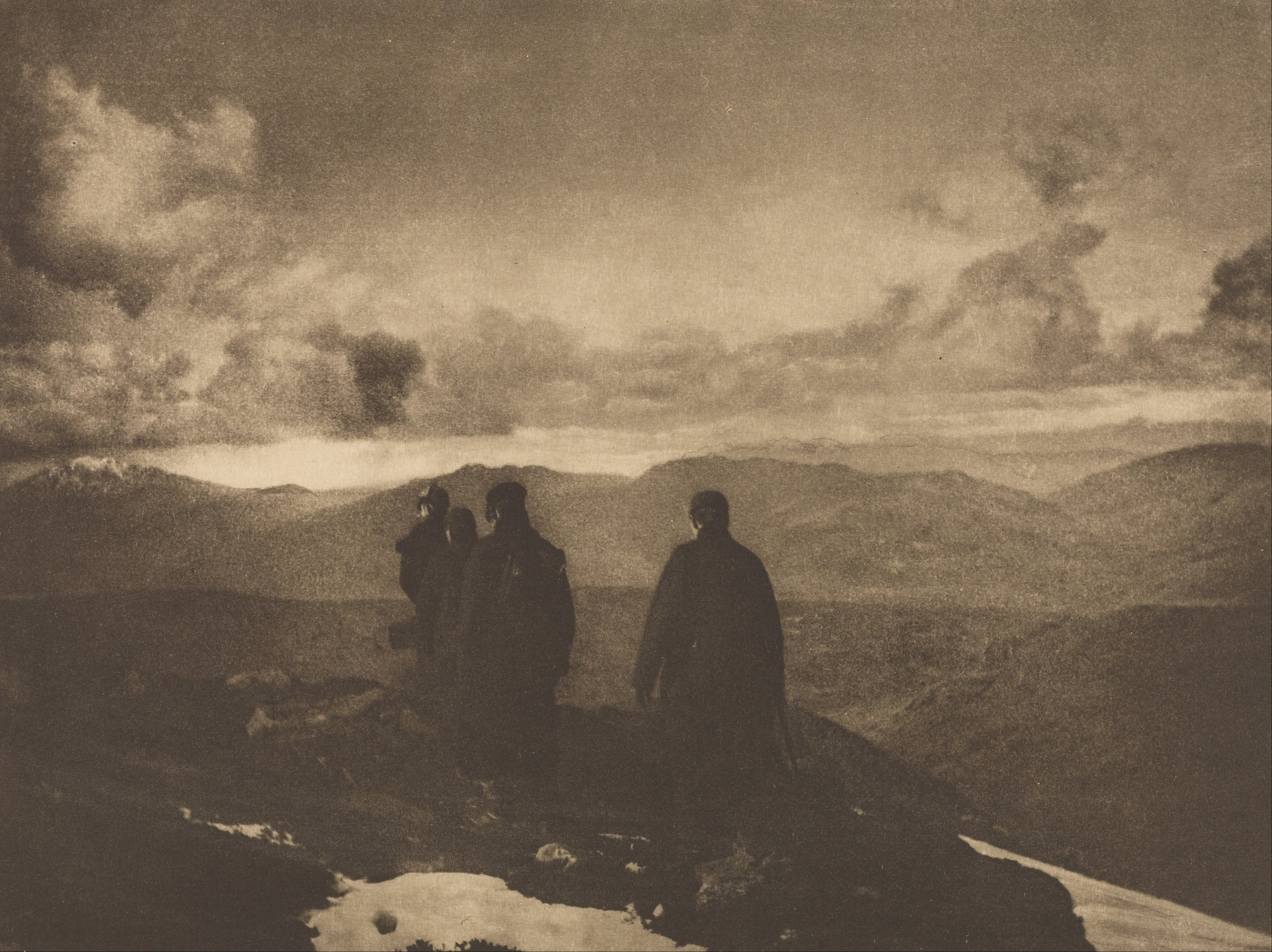
The Dark Mountains

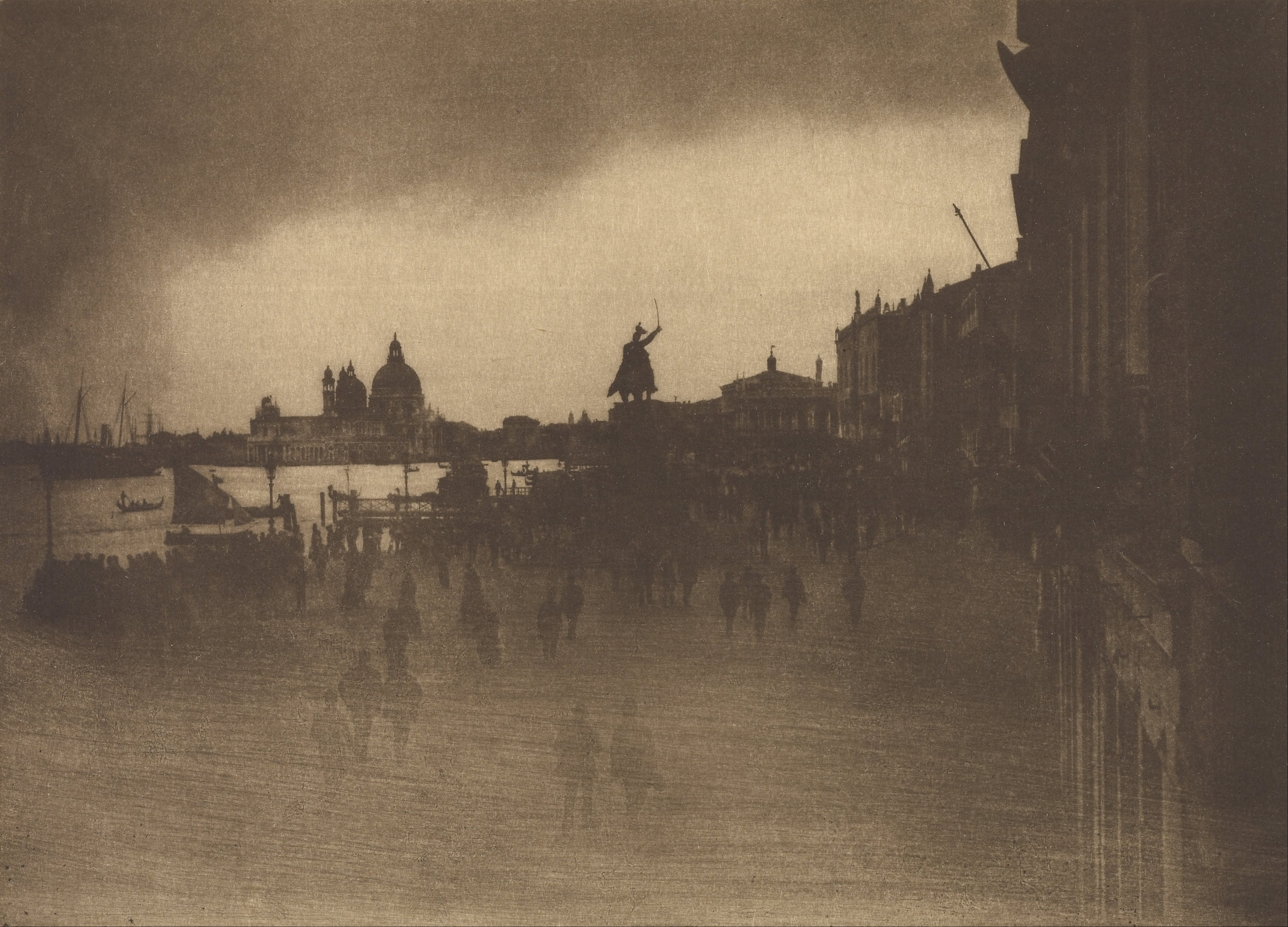
The Riva Schiavoni, Venice
