= John Marin =

American artist (1870–1953)

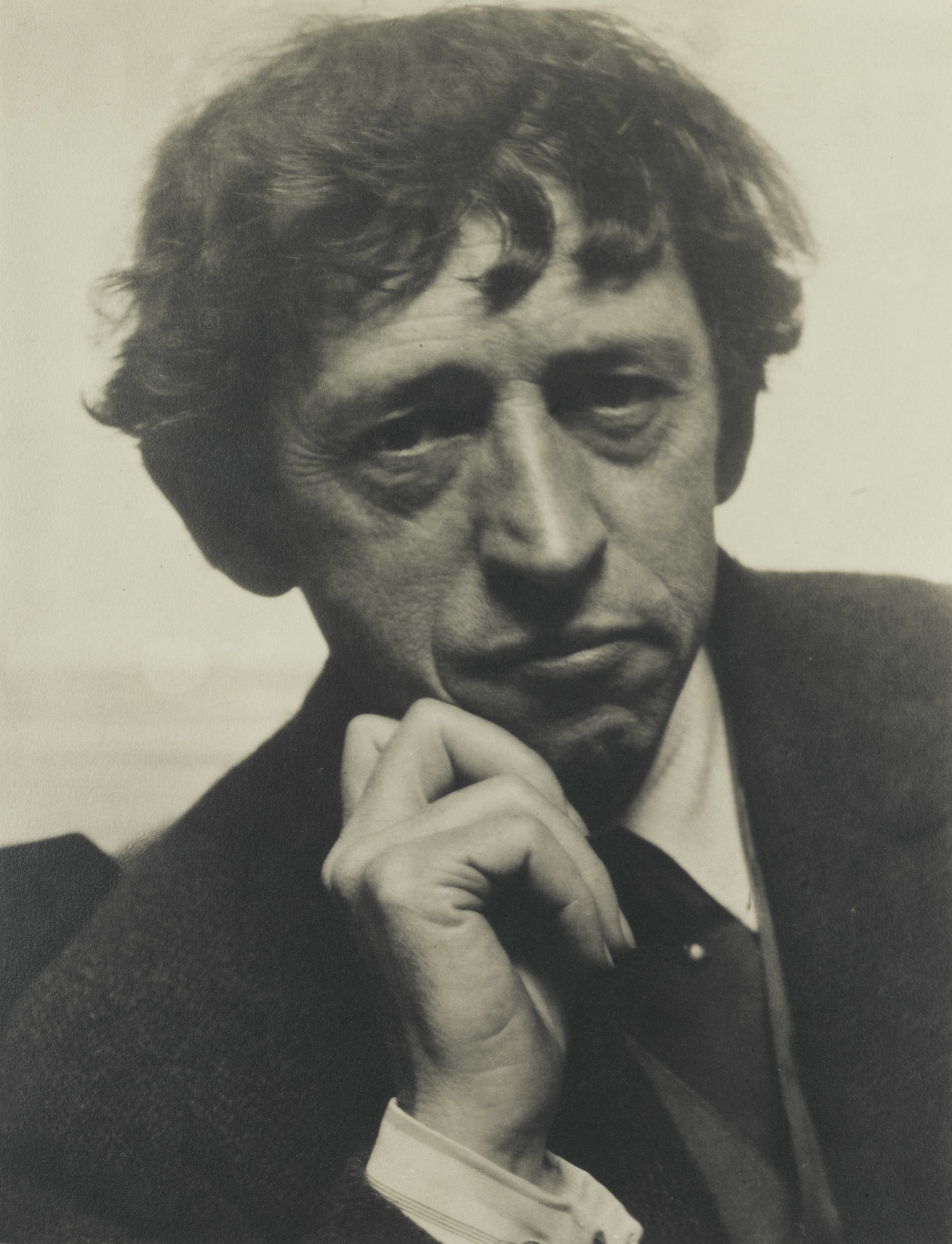
- John Marin in 1922, by Alfred Stieglitz
- Born: December 23, 1870; Rutherford, New Jersey, United States
- Died: October 1, 1953 (aged 82); Addison, Maine, United States
- Burial place: Fairview Cemetery, Fairview, New Jersey, United States
- Education: Stevens Institute of Technology, Pennsylvania Academy of the Fine Arts, Art Students League of New York
- Occupation: Visual artist
- Known for: Painting
- Movement: Modern art

John Marin (December 23, 1870 – October 2, 1953) was an early American modernist visual artist. He is known for his abstract landscape paintings and watercolors.

== Early life and education ==
Marin was born on December 23, 1870, in Rutherford, New Jersey. His mother died nine days after his birth, and he was raised by two aunts in Weehawken, New Jersey.

He attended the Stevens Institute of Technology for a year, and tried unsuccessfully to become an architect. From 1899 to 1901, Marin attended the Pennsylvania Academy of the Fine Arts in Philadelphia. In Philadelphia he studied with Thomas Pollock Anshutz, Hugh Henry Breckenridge and William Merritt Chase. He also studied at the Art Students League of New York.

== Career ==
In 1905, Marin went to Europe, initially traveling to Paris. He exhibited his work in the Salon, where he also got his first exposure to modern art. He traveled through Europe for six years, and painted in the Netherlands, Belgium, England, and Italy. In Europe, he mastered a type of watercolor where he achieved an abstract ambience, almost a pure abstraction with color that ranges from transparency to translucency, accompanied by strong opacities, and linear elements, always with a sense of freedom, which became one of his trademarks.

In 1909, Marin held his first one-man exhibition at Alfred Stieglitz's 291 gallery in New York City. He had been introduced to Stieglitz by the photographer Edward Steichen, whom Marin in turn had met through the painter Arthur B. Carles. Marin's association with Stieglitz would last nearly forty years, and Stieglitz's philosophical and financial support would prove essential. From 1909 until his death in 1946, Stieglitz showed Marin's work almost every year in one of his galleries. Marin also participated in the landmark 1913 Armory Show.

Marin spent his first summer in Maine in 1914 and almost immediately the rocky coast there became one of his favorite subjects. Over the rest of his life, Marin became intimately familiar with the many moods of the sea and sky in Maine. "In painting water make the hand move the way the water moves," Marin wrote in a 1933 letter to an admirer of his technique.

Marin had a retrospective show in 1936 at the Museum of Modern Art. Late in life Marin achieved tremendous prestige as an American painter, an elder statesman of American art. In 1950, he was honored by the University of Maine and Yale University with honorary degrees of Doctor of Fine Arts.

Marin was a resident of Cliffside Park, New Jersey for many years, and also maintained a summer home in Addison, Maine, where he died in 1953. He was interred at Fairview Cemetery (Fairview, New Jersey).

== Works ==
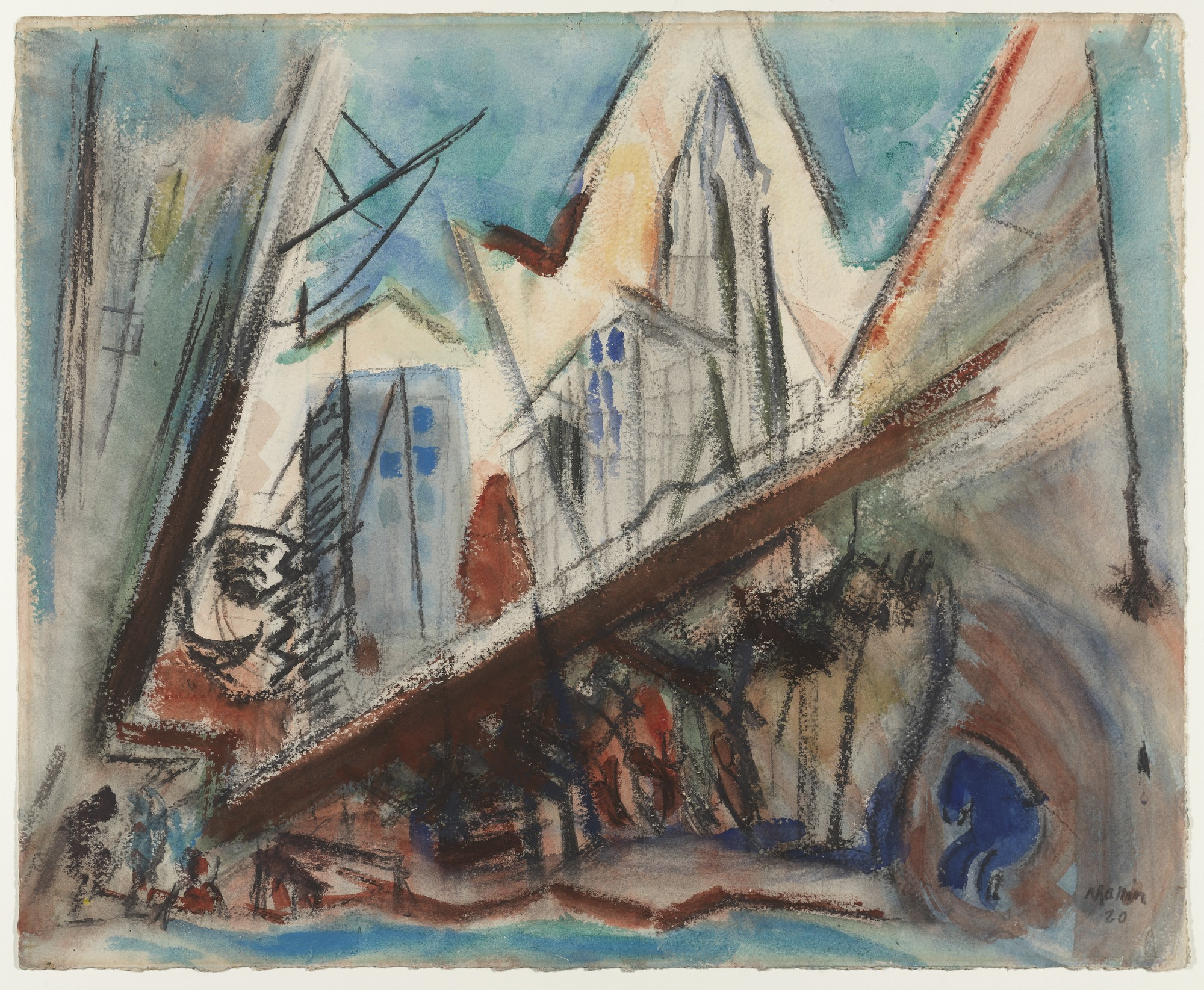
Lower Manhattan (1920), is one of the artworks included in Westinghouse Time Capsules.

Marin was among the first American artists to make abstract paintings. Marin is often credited with influencing the Abstract Expressionists. His treatment of paint—handling oils almost like watercolors—his forays into abstraction, and his use of evocative stretches of bare canvas caught the eye of younger painters. His experience with architecture might have contributed to the role played by architectural themes in his paintings and watercolors.

The largest collection of Marin's paintings, watercolors, drawings, etchings, and photographs are at the Colby College Museum of Art, the John Marin Collection, given to the college by John Marin Jr. and Norma B. Marin. Marin's paintings are also represented in several important permanent collections and museums, including the Metropolitan Museum of Art in New York, the Museum of Modern Art in New York, the San Francisco Museum of Modern Art, the Whitney Museum of American Art in New York, the Brooklyn Museum, the Cleveland Museum of Art, the Art Institute of Chicago, the National Gallery of Art and the Phillips Collection, both in Washington, D.C., the Fogg Art Museum in Cambridge, Massachusetts, the Currier Museum of Art in Manchester, New Hampshire, and many others. The White House acquired his 1952 painting The Circus No. 1 in 1962. Featured in "Art in The White House A Nation's Pride". Now displayed in the Green Room. The artist's estate is represented by Schoelkopf Gallery, in New York City.
