= Joseph Keiley =

American photographer & writer (1869-1914)

Joseph Turner Keiley
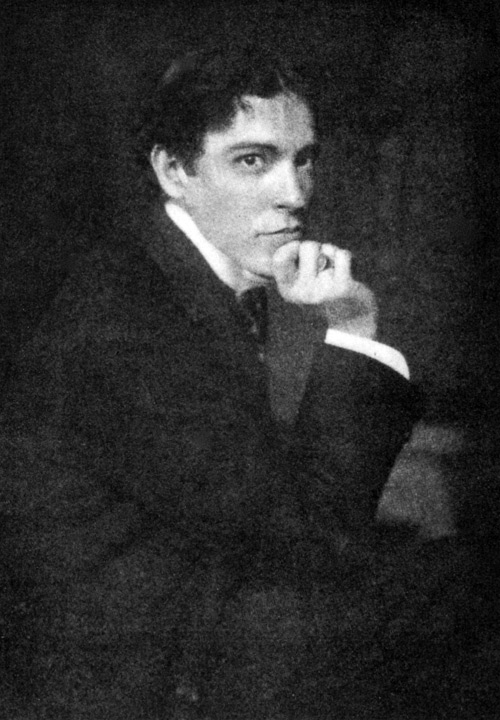
- Joseph T. Keiley, photographed by Gertrude Käsebier, 1900
- Born: July 26, 1869; Maryland, U.S.
- Died: January 21, 1914 (aged 44); New York, New York, U.S.

Joseph Turner Keiley (26 July 1869 – 21 January 1914) was an early 20th-century photographer, writer and art critic. He was a close associate of photographer Alfred Stieglitz and was one of the founding members of the Photo-Secession. Over the course of his life Keiley's photographs were exhibited in more than two dozen international exhibitions, and he achieved international acclaim for both his artistic style and his writing.

== Life ==
Keiley was born in Maryland, the eldest of seven children born to John D. and Ellen Keiley. The family moved soon after his birth to Brooklyn, New York, where he grew up. Little is known about his childhood.

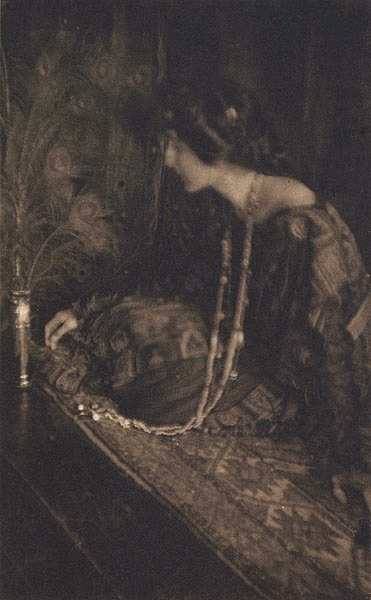
"Lenore" by Joseph Keiley

He went to school in New York and became an attorney, founding the Manhattan law firm of Keiley & Haviland. He began photographing in the mid-1890s and met fellow New York photographer Gertrude Käsebier, who at that time was engaged in photographing American Indians who were performing in Buffalo Bill's Wild West Show. Keiley also photographed some of the same subjects, and in 1898 nine of his prints were exhibited in the Philadelphia Photographic Salon. One of the judges for the Salon was Stieglitz, who also wrote a glowing review of Keiley's work.

Due to his success in Philadelphia the next year Keiley became the fourth American elected to the Linked Ring, which at that time was the most prominent photographic society in the world promoting pictorialism.

In 1900 he joined the Camera Club of New York and had a one-person exhibition in the Club's gallery. At that time Stieglitz was serving as the Vice President of the Club and editor of the Club's journal Camera Notes, and Keiley soon became his closest ally. Stieglitz asked him to become Associate Editor of the journal, and over the next few years Keiley was one of its most prolific writers, contributing articles on aesthetics, exhibition reviews and technical articles. He also had several of his photographs published in the journal.

While working with Stieglitz the two began experimenting with a new printing technique for glycerine-developed platinum prints, and they co-authored an article on the subject that was later published in Camera Notes.

In 1902 Stieglitz included Keiley as one of the founding members of the Photo-Secession, and he had fifteen of his prints (one more than Edward Steichen) included in the inaugural exhibition of the Photo-Secession at the National Arts Club.

When Stieglitz started Camera Work in 1903 he asked Keiley to become associate editor, and for the next eleven years he was second only to Stieglitz in the details of publishing the journal. He contributed dozens of essays, reviews and technical articles, and he advised Stieglitz about promising new photographers from Europe.

Keiley had seven gravures published in Camera Work, one in 1903 and six in 1907.

Later in his life he traveled to Europe and Mexico, and he spent several years trying to seat a radical friend, in a peaceful coup, as President of Mexico.

In 1914 Keiley died of Bright's Disease. Stieglitz wrote a long eulogy for his friend in Camera Work, and he kept Keiley's name on the masthead of the journal until it ceased publication in 1917.
