= George H. Seeley =

American photographer (1880–1955)

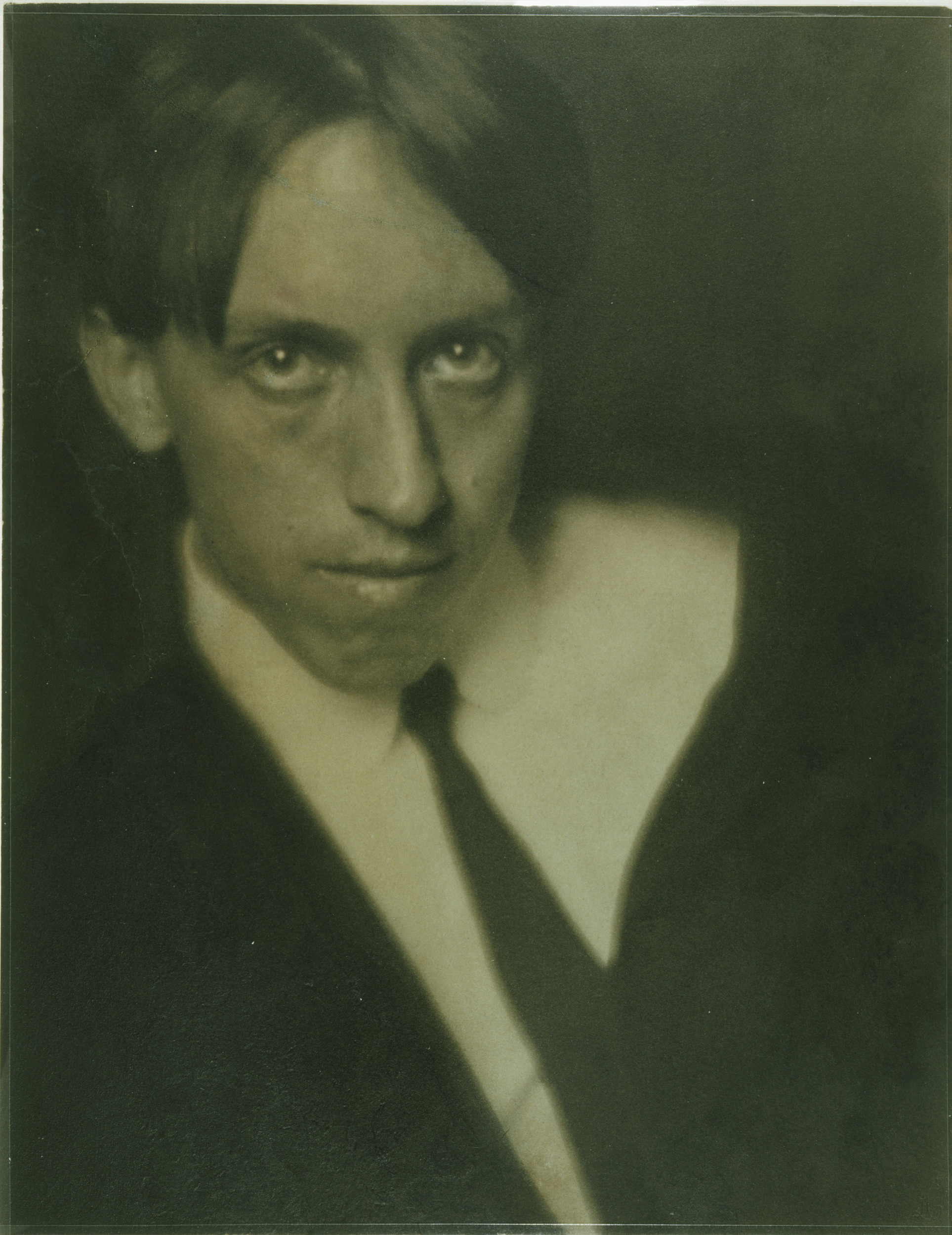
- Seeley in 1903
- Born: George Henry Seeley; January 19, 1880; Stockbridge, Massachusetts, U.S.
- Died: December 21, 1955 (aged 75); Stockbridge, Massachusetts, U.S.
- Education: Massachusetts Normal Art School
- Occupation: Photographer

George Henry Seeley (1880–1955) was an American photographer, primarily associated with the pictorialist movement.

== Early life and education ==
Seeley was born on January 19, 1880 in Stockbridge, Massachusetts, and attended the Massachusetts Normal Art School from 1897 to 1901, as a student in painting. He studied under Joseph DeCamp, who encouraged his interest in natural light, and became interested in photography after meeting F. Holland Day.

== Career ==
He returned to Stockbridge in 1902, where he worked in both painting and photography.

In 1904, Seeley's photographs were included in the First American Photographic Salon in New York City, where Alfred Stieglitz encountered them; Stieglitz then invited Seeley to join the Photo Secession, of which Seeley was a member from 1906 to 1910.

After leaving Stieglitz's group, Seeley continued creating in a pictorialist aesthetic while the style as a whole declined in critical praise; this, coupled with wartime shortages in raw materials needed for photography, hurt Seeley's career as a photographer. While Seeley continued exhibiting his photographs until the 1930s, little of what was shown was new material.

Later in life, Seeley returned to painting, and also served as a newspaper correspondent for a Stockbridge publication.

== Death ==
He died in Stockbridge on December 21, 1955.

== Photographs from Camera Work ==
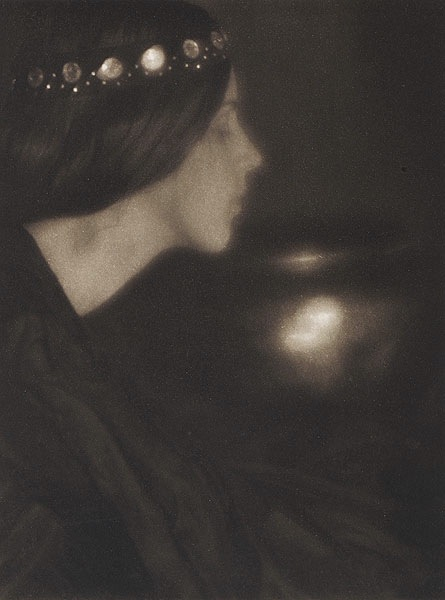
Black Bowl, 1907

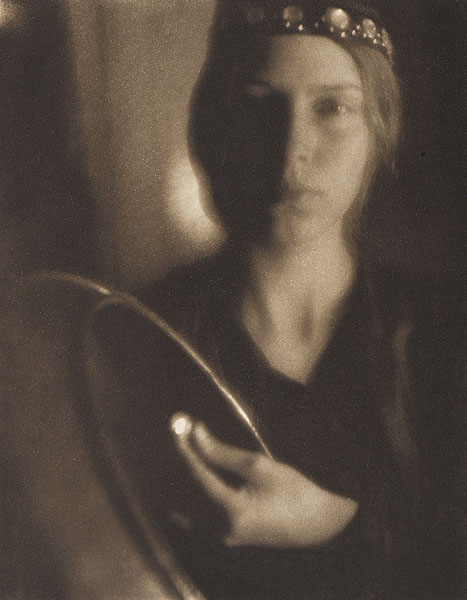
Firefly, 1907

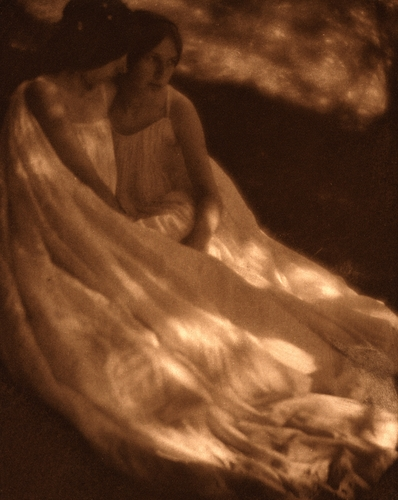
The Burning of Rome, 1907

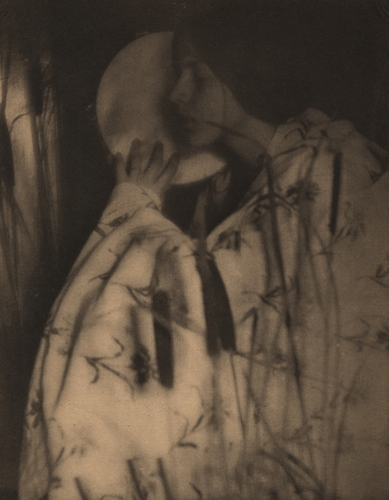
Autumn, 1910

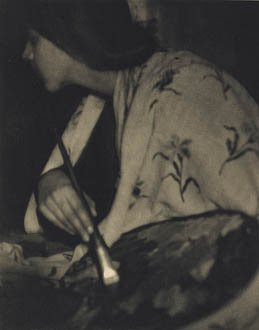
The Artist, 1910
