= Georgia O'Keeffe – Torso =

1918 Alfred Stieglitz photograph

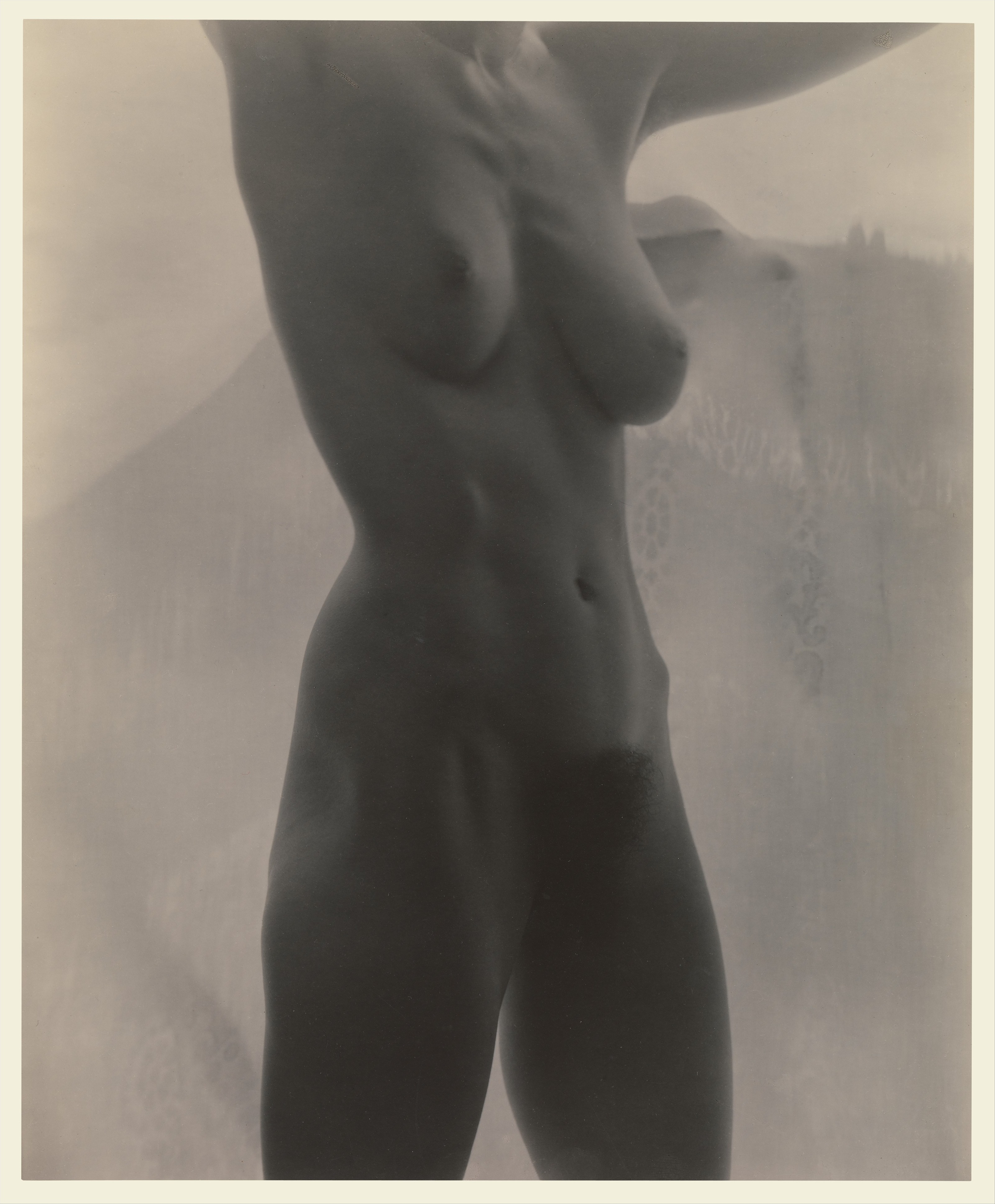
Georgia O'Keeffe – Torso (1918) by Alfred Stieglitz

Georgia O'Keeffe – Torso, also known as Georgia O'Keeffe – Nude, is a black and white photograph taken by Alfred Stieglitz in 1918. It is one of the more than 300 photographs that he took of his future wife, the painter Georgia O'Keeffe.

== Description ==
Stieglitz took dozens of pictures of O'Keeffe's body, including her hands and her nude torso. The photograph depicts her naked torso, seen from below, with her arms only partially visible and without showing her head. The Torso, with its uplifted arms and muscular thighs, has a sculptoric quality that seems influenced by Auguste Rodin, whose work Stieglitz knew well and had shown at the Photo-Secession.

The Torso was in the Stieglitz exhibition at the Anderson Galleries in New York City, where he presented pictures of several parts of the body of O'Keeffe, and which had a particular impact. Herbert Seligmann wrote that "Hands, feet, hands and breasts, torsos, all parts and attitudes of the human body seen with a passion of revelation, produced an astonishing effect on the multitudes who wandered in and out of the rooms".

== Art market ==
A print of this picture sold for $1,360,000 at Sotheby's New York, on 14 February 2006, making it the second most expensive price reached by a Stieglitz photograph.

== Public collections ==
There are prints of Torso at the Metropolitan Museum of Art, New York, the National Gallery of Art, Washington, D.C., The Art Institute of Chicago, the J. Paul Getty Museum, Los Angeles, and the Museé d’Orsay, in Paris.

== See also ==
- Georgia O'Keeffe – Hands (1919)
