= The Last Joke, Bellagio =

1987 photograph by Alfred Stieglitz

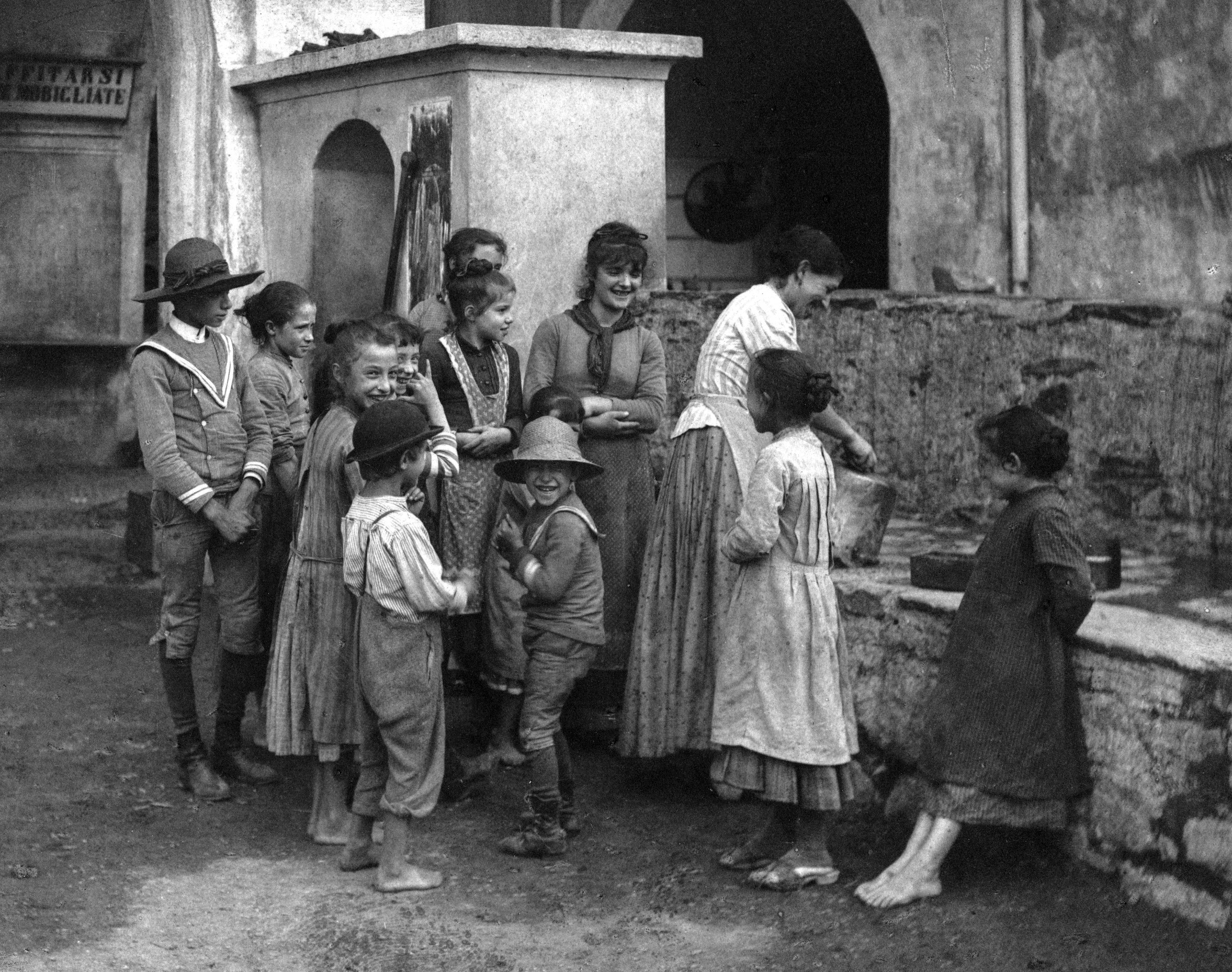
The Last Joke, Bellagio (1887) by Alfred Stieglitz

The Last Joke, Bellagio, also known as The Good Joke, is a black and white photograph taken by Alfred Stieglitz during a Summer travel to Italy in 1887. He was then living and studying in Germany and decided to travel through several cities of Italy at the Summer.

== History and description ==
Stieglitz visited, among other places, Bellagio, on Lake Como, Lombardy, where he took several photographs, often depicting landscapes and folk scenes. This one was part of the group that he took while at Bellagio. The picture depicts a candid scene, without any artificiality, and depicts several children apparently laughing at a joke that the woman at the fountain has just told. The photo is closely cropped, focusing on the children, with architectural arches in the background providing a "stage set" for the image.

Stieglitz sent twelve photographs from this trip to The Amateur Photographer' magazine's Photographic Holiday Work Competition. This picture appeared in the 25 November 1887 issue. It was considered the only spontaneous work in the competition, judged by British photographer Peter Henry Emerson, and it won the first prize.

== Public collections ==
There are at least three prints of this photograph; they belong to the collections of the National Gallery of Art, Washington, D.C., the Museum of Modern Art, New York, and of a private collector.
