= Katherine Stieglitz =

Daughter of Alfred Stieglitz (1898–1971)

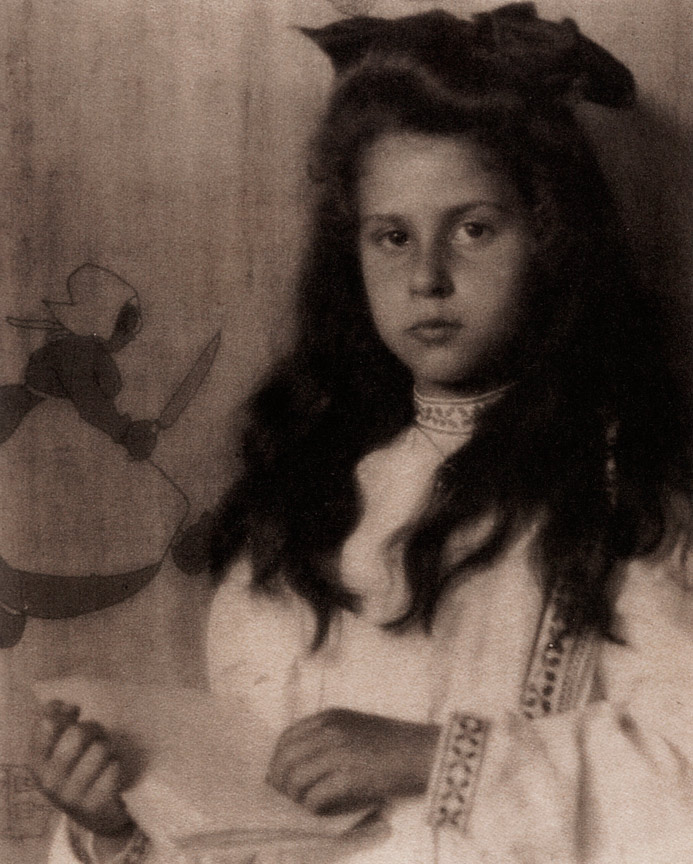
- Katherine Stiegliz in 1905 at age of 7
- Born: September 27, 1898; Manhattan, New York City, New York, U.S.
- Died: November 20, 1971 (aged 73)
- Burial place: Mount Auburn Cemetery, Cambridge, Massachusetts, U.S.
- Other name: Kitty
- Education: Smith College
- Children: 1
- Father: Alfred Stieglitz

Katherine Stieglitz, or Katherine Stieglitz Stearns, (September 27, 1898 – November 20, 1971) was the daughter of Emmeline, or Emmy, and Alfred Stieglitz, an American photographer and modern art promoter. She was the subject of many of her father's photographs, particularly in her early years. They were exhibited and received praise for their wholesome sentiment. She graduated from Smith College before marrying Milton Sprague Stearns. After the birth of her son in 1923, she was institutionalized for depression and hallucinations and remained there until her death in 1971.

== Early life ==
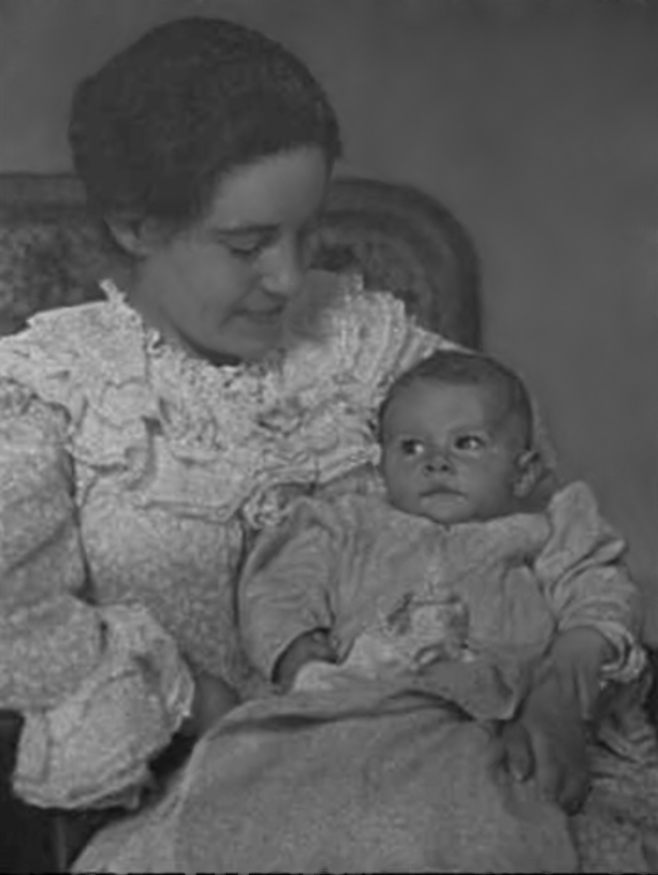
Alfred Stieglitz, Emmeline and Katherine, 1898

Katherine Stieglitz, or "Kitty", was born on September 27, 1898, to Emmeline and Alfred Stieglitz in Manhattan, New York. The family lived on Madison Avenue, between 83rd and 84th Streets, shortly after her birth.

Using Emmy's inheritance, the couple hired a governess, cook, and a chambermaid. Stieglitz worked at the same pace at The Camera Club of New York and on his own photography as before the birth of his daughter, and as a result, the couple predominantly lived separate lives under the same roof. Emmy, who hoped she would one day earn Stieglitz's love, continued giving him an allowance from her inheritance.

Alfred Stieglitz captured a lot of photographs of his daughter when she was young, so much so that Emmy asked him to stop taking her photographs. He continued capturing her with different gestures and scenes, almost obsessively, until about 1902. Mother and daughter were also photographed by Clarence Hudson White and Gertrude Käsebier.

The family traveled to Europe in 1904, during which time Alfred was hospitalized in Berlin and Emmy and Kitty visited relatives in Stuttgart, Germany. The entire family was quite sick during their time in London, and before they were to depart for home. Their return was delayed three weeks until they recovered.

In 1907, Alfred experimented with color photography and captured the well-dressed and long-haired girl in photographs with her holding on to flowers or plants, a common theme of Alfred's to see the female sex in one with nature. He exhibited the photographs of her in several exhibits, receiving praise from critics. Charles Henry Caffin said of his works, "When he sets his figures in a scene, they become part of it and one with it in spite. He puts them there because they belong to it. His sentiment, never degenerating into sentimentality, is always wholesome and sincere, and his pictures have the added charm of handsome arrangement and of simple and controlled impressiveness." Her father took some pictures of her during her adolescence, but little after her teenage years.

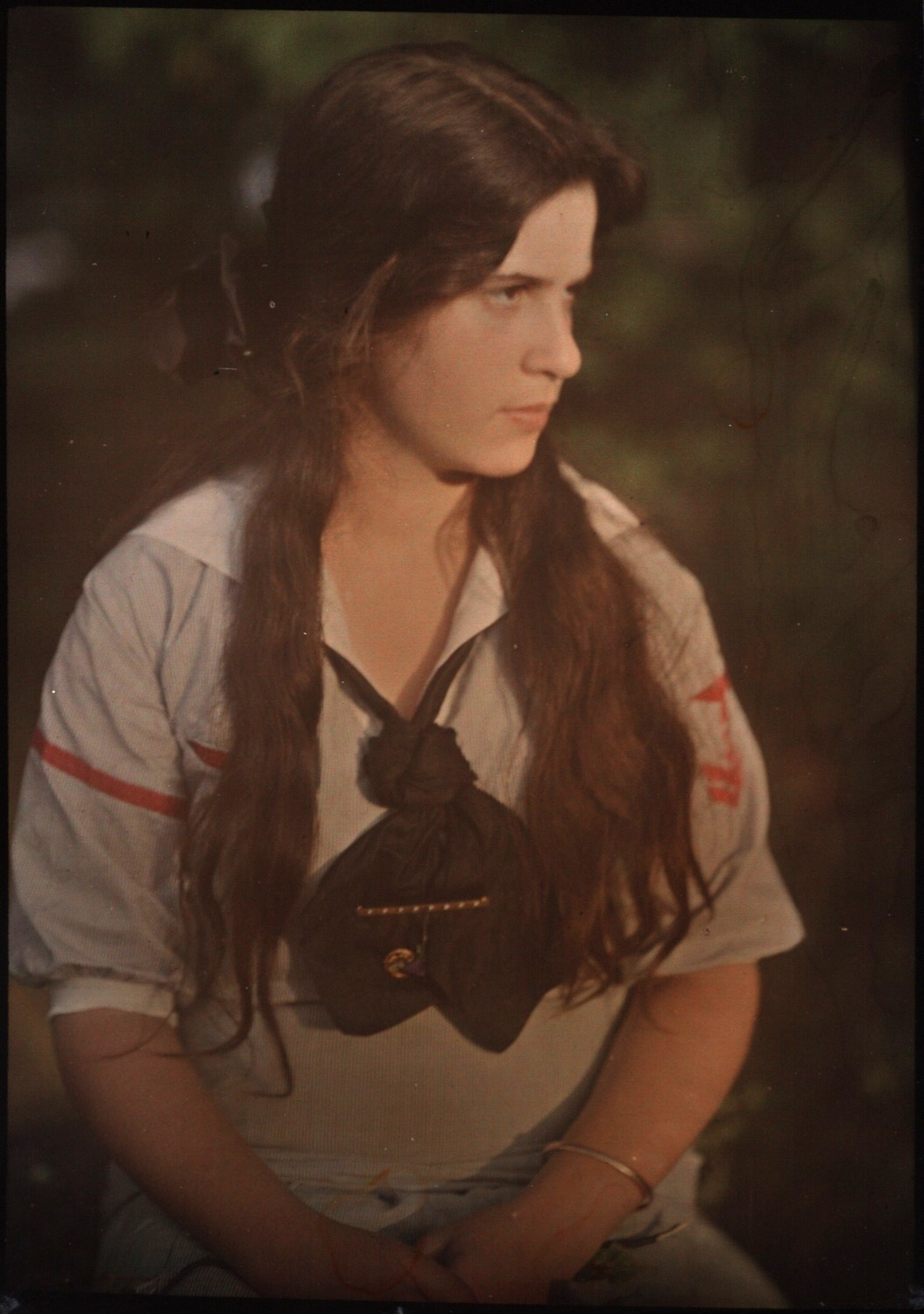
Katherine Stieglitz autochrome taken in 1910, when she was 12 years old

Kitty's mother and father were often parted, such as when Emmy traveled to Europe, and Kitty was left in her father's care. Alfred was quite formal with Kitty and spent little time with his wife and daughter, but they traveled as a family in 1911, with an active vacation through Europe. The Stieglitz family also spent summers at the family home at Lake George, which was visited often by family members.

== Education ==
About 1917, Stieglitz began her studies at Smith College in Northampton, Massachusetts.

In early July 1918, her father drove her to camp and returned to the Stieglitz apartment in New York, where he took pictures of Georgia O'Keeffe. Emmy arrived home earlier than expected and found them together and threw Alfred out of the house.

Stieglitz graduated from Smith College in 1921.

== Marriage and pregnancy ==
Stieglitz married Milton Sprague Stearns, a Harvard University graduate, on June 22, 1922, in a Unitarian Church. The wedding was not attended by his parents and her father was not invited. Following the wedding, the Stearns lived in Allston, Massachusetts. One year after their marriage, their son Milton Sprague Stearns, Jr. was born on June 3, 1923.

== Postpartum depression and institutionalization ==
Stieglitz, like her maternal grandmother, suffered from postpartum depression within days after the birth of her son, Milton Stearns, Jr. In 1923, she was treated for depression and hallucinations and was institutionalized at Craig House in Beacon, New York.

Craig House was the first privately owned psychiatric hospital, a "stunning gothic mansion" that treated the wealthy with a gymnasium and a swimming pool. Led by Doctor Jonathan Slocum, it specialized in progressive treatment approaches, like "intense recreation" and talk therapy.

In 1924, Stieglitz's parents divorced and within four months her father and Georgia O'Keeffe married in a small, private ceremony.

In 1934, Zelda Fitzgerald was later also a patient at Craig House.

Stieglitz’s husband died in 1957.

== Death ==
After being institutionalized for 48 years, Stieglitz died in 1971. She was buried at Mount Auburn Cemetery in Cambridge, Massachusetts.

== Family ==
Milton Sprague Stearns, Jr. served in the United States Navy during World War II as a lieutenant and navigator. A graduate of Harvard University and Harvard Business School, he was a successful banker, a leader in technology fields, and consultant over his career. He and his wife Virginia had five children. He died in 2015 in Boynton Beach, Florida, and was buried at Mount Auburn Cemetery in Cambridge, Massachusetts.
