= Alfred Stieglitz =

American photographer (1864–1946)

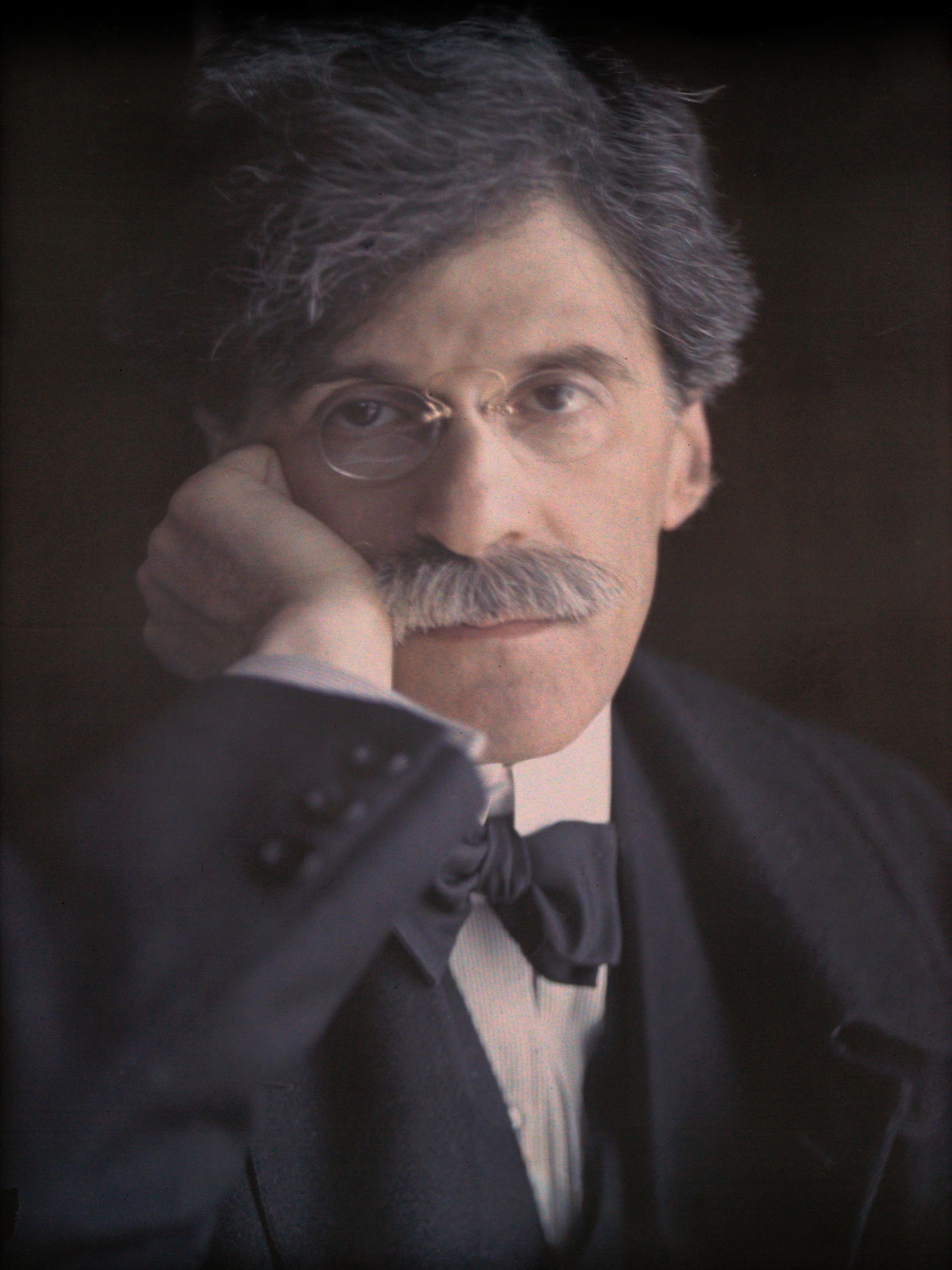
- Autochrome self-portrait, c. 1907
- Born: January 1, 1864; Hoboken, New Jersey, U.S.
- Died: July 13, 1946 (aged 82); New York City, U.S.
- Known for: Photography
- Spouses: Emmeline Obermayer (m. 1893; div. 1924) Georgia O'Keeffe (m. 1924)

Alfred Stieglitz HonFRPS (/ˈstiːɡlɪts/; January 1, 1864 – July 13, 1946) was an American photographer and modern art promoter who was instrumental over his 50-year career in making photography an accepted art form. In addition to his photography, Stieglitz was known for the New York art galleries that he ran in the early part of the 20th century, where he introduced many avant-garde European artists to the U.S. He was married to painter Georgia O'Keeffe.

== Early life and education ==
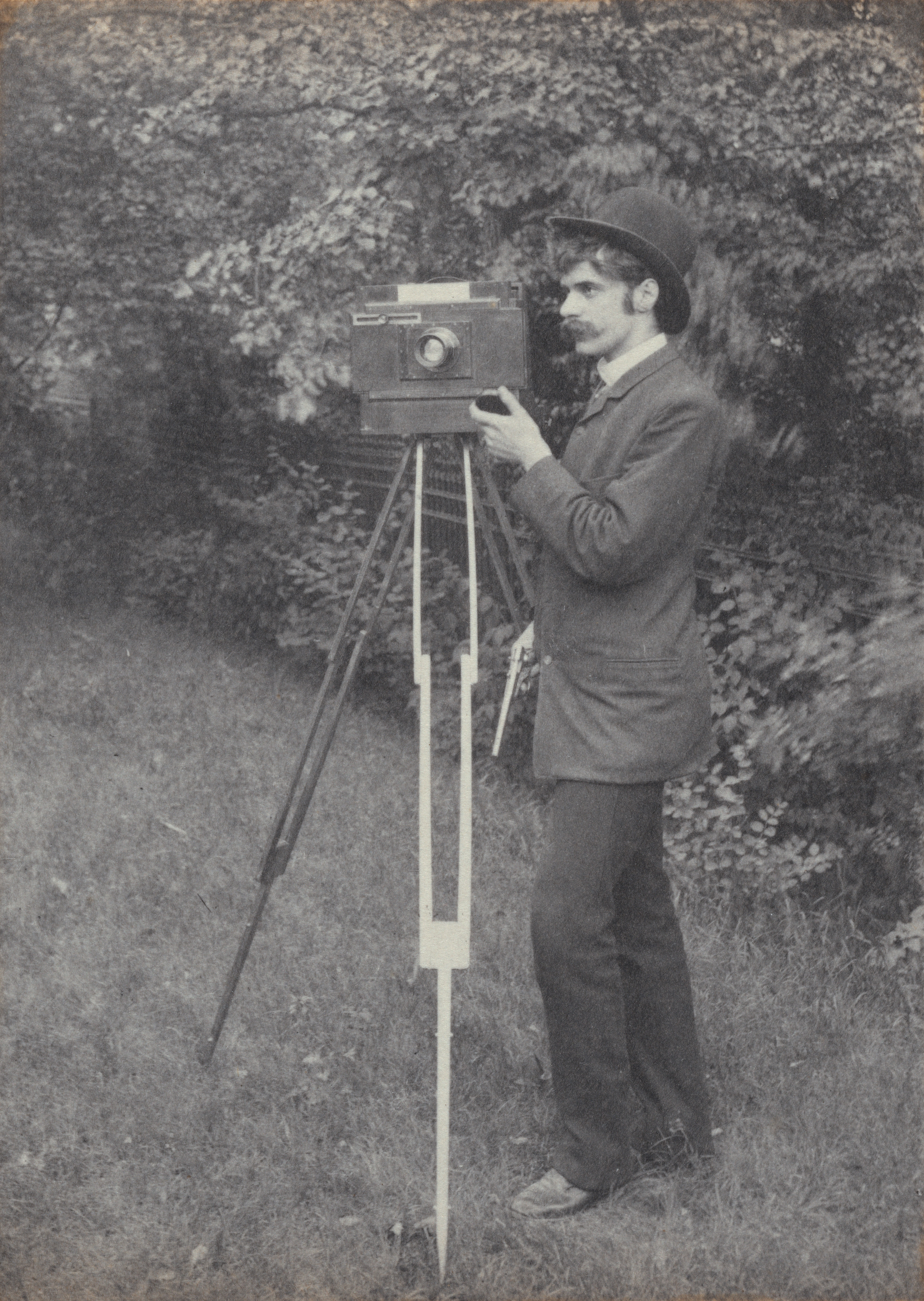
1886 self-portrait

Stieglitz was born in Hoboken, New Jersey, the first son of German Jewish immigrants Edward Stieglitz (1833–1909) and Hedwig Ann Werner (1845–1922). His father was a lieutenant in the Union Army and worked as a wool merchant. He had five siblings, Flora (1865–1890), twins Julius (1867–1937) and Leopold (1867–1956), Agnes (1869–1952) and Selma (1871–1957). Alfred Stieglitz, seeing the close relationship of the twins, wished he had a soul mate of his own during his childhood.

Stieglitz attended Charlier Institute, a Christian school in New York, in 1871. The following year, his family began spending the summers at Lake George in the Adirondack Mountains, a tradition that continued into Stieglitz's adulthood.

So that he could qualify for admission to the City College of New York, Stieglitz was enrolled in a public school for his junior year of high school, but found the education inadequate. In 1881, Edward Stieglitz sold his company for US $400,000 and moved his family to Europe for the next several years so that his children would receive a better education. Alfred Stieglitz enrolled in the Real Gymnasium in Karlsruhe. The next year, Alfred Stieglitz studied mechanical engineering at the Technische Hochschule in Berlin. He enrolled in a chemistry class taught by Hermann Wilhelm Vogel, a scientist and researcher, who worked on the chemical processes for developing photographs. In Vogel, Stieglitz found both the academic challenge he needed and an outlet for his growing artistic and cultural interests. He received an allowance of $1,200 (equivalent to $40,034 in 2025) a year.

== Early interest in photography ==
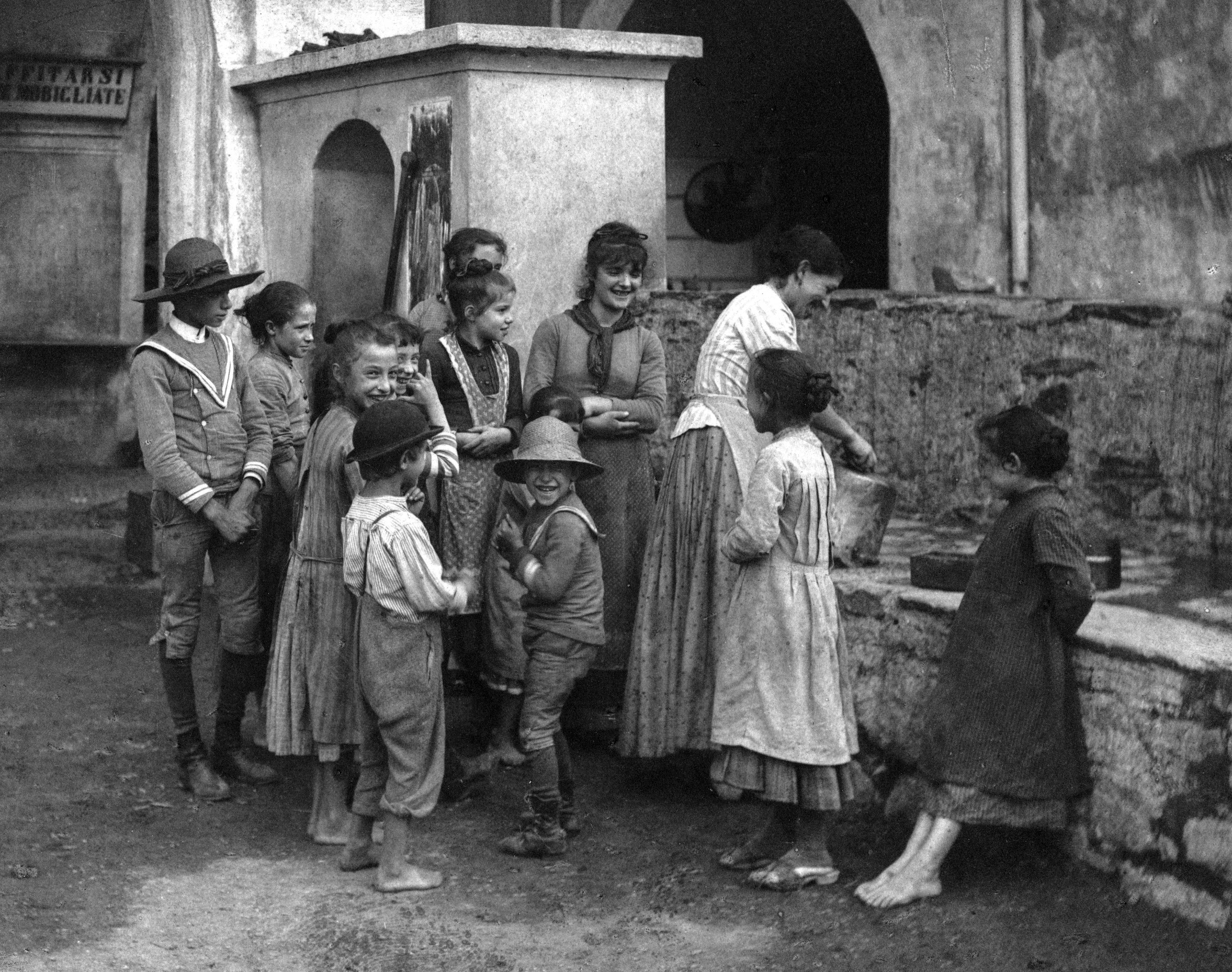
Alfred Stieglitz, The Last Joke, Bellagio, 1887

In 1884, his parents returned to America, but 20-year-old Stieglitz remained in Germany and collected books on photography and photographers in Europe and the U.S. He bought his first camera, an 8 × 10 plate film camera, and traveled through the Netherlands, Italy and Germany. He took photographs of landscapes and workers in the countryside. Photography, he later wrote, "fascinated me, first as a toy, then as a passion, then as an obsession."

Through his self-study, he saw photography as an art form. In 1887, he wrote his very first article, "A Word or Two about Amateur Photography in Germany", for the new magazine Amateur Photographer.

He won first place for his photograph The Last Joke, Bellagio from Amateur Photographer in 1887. The next year he won both first and second prizes in the same competition, and his reputation began to spread, as several German and British photographic magazines published his work.

In 1890, his sister Flora died while giving birth, and Stieglitz returned to New York.

== Career ==
=== New York and the Camera Club (1891–1901) ===
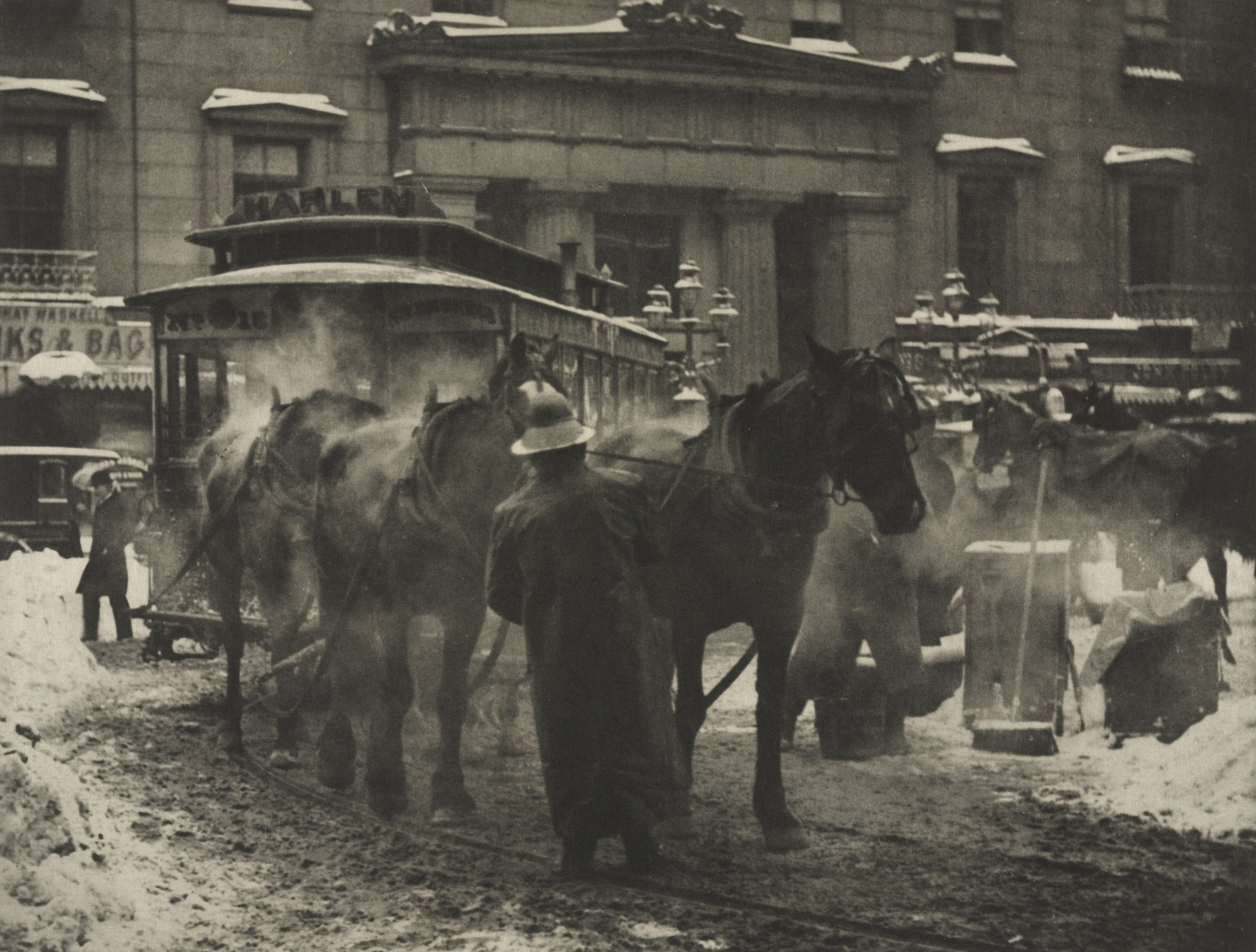
The Terminal (1893) by Alfred Stieglitz

Stieglitz considered himself an artist, but he refused to sell his photographs. His father purchased a small photography business for him so that he could earn a living in his chosen profession. Because he demanded high quality images and paid his employee high wages, the Photochrome Engraving Company rarely made a profit.

In late 1892, Stieglitz bought his first hand-held camera, a Folmer and Schwing 4×5 plate film camera. Stieglitz gained a reputation for his photography and his magazine articles about how photography is a form of art. In the spring of 1893, he became co-editor of The American Amateur Photographer. In order to avoid the appearance of bias in his opinions and because Photochrome was now printing the photogravures for the magazine, Stieglitz refused to draw a salary.

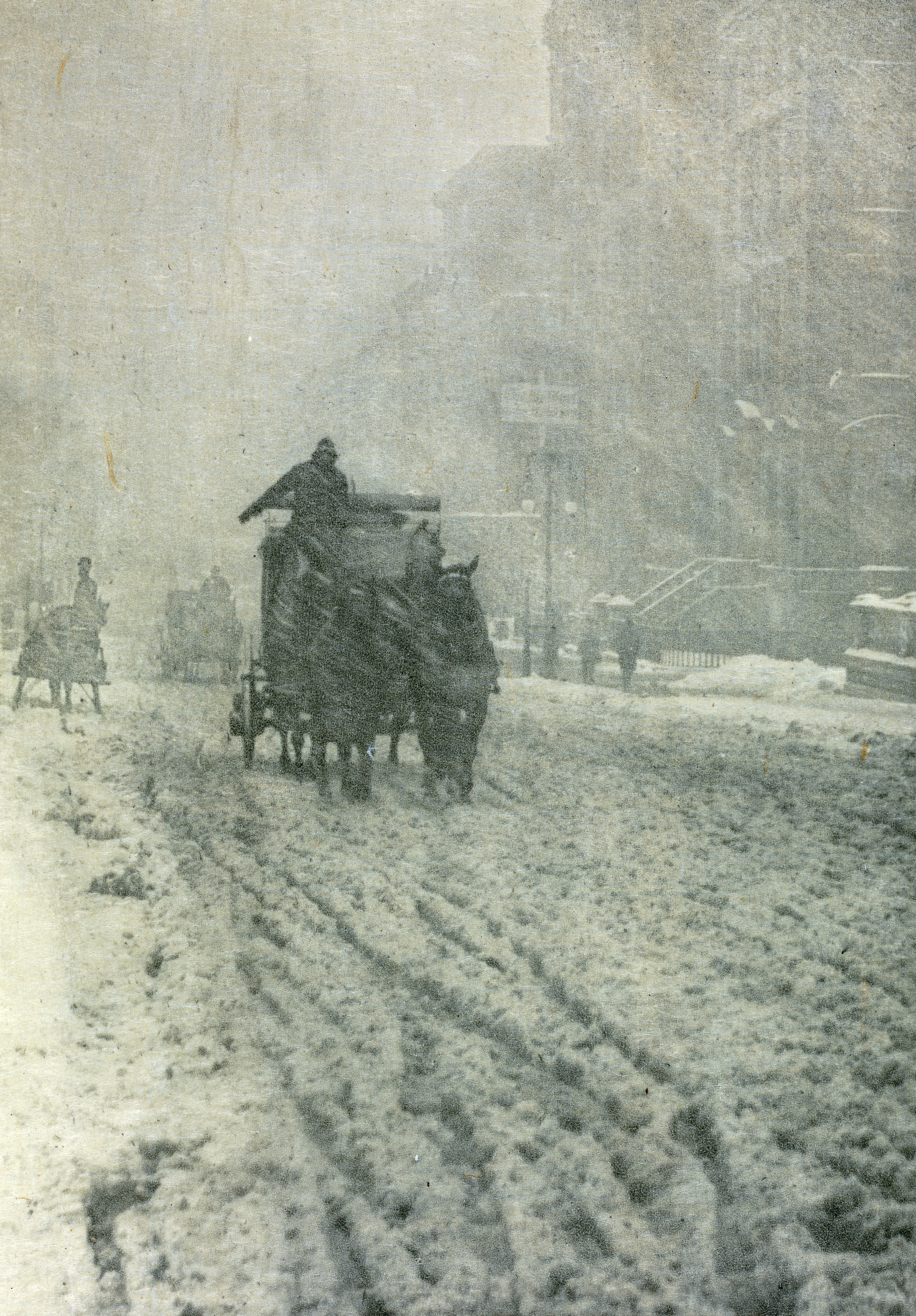
Winter – Fifth Avenue (1893) by Alfred Stieglitz

On November 16, 1893, the 29-year-old Stieglitz married 20-year-old Emmeline Obermeyer, the sister of his close friend and business associate Joe Obermeyer and granddaughter of brewer Samuel Liebmann. They were married in New York City. Stieglitz later wrote that he did not love Emmy, as she was commonly known, when they were married and that their marriage was not consummated for at least a year. Daughter of a wealthy brewery owner, she had inherited money from her father. Stieglitz came to regret his decision to marry Emmy, as she did not share his artistic and cultural interests. Stieglitz biographer Richard Whelan summed up their relationship by saying Stieglitz "resented her bitterly for not becoming his twin." Throughout his life Stieglitz maintained a desire for younger women.

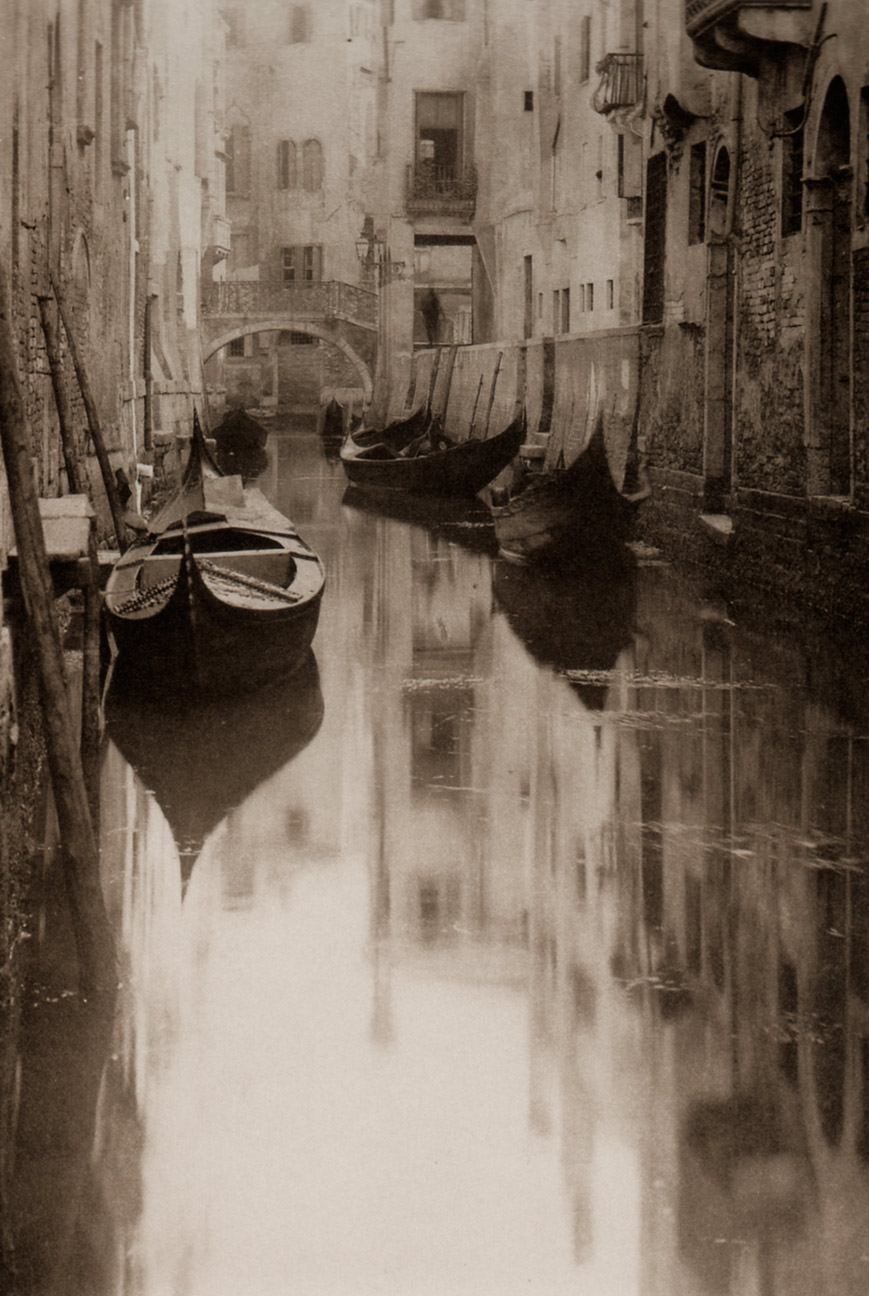
Venetian Canal (1894) by Alfred Stieglitz

Stieglitz was unanimously elected as one of the first two American members of the British photographic society, The Linked Ring. Stieglitz saw this recognition as the impetus he needed to step up his cause of promoting artistic photography in the United States.

In May 1896, the two organizations joined to form The Camera Club of New York. Although offered the organization's presidency, he became vice-president. He developed programs for the club and was involved in all aspects of the organization. He told journalist Theodore Dreiser he wanted to "make the club so large, its labors so distinguished and its authority so final that [it] may satisfactorily use its great prestige to compel recognition for the individual artists without and within its walls."

Stieglitz turned the Camera Club's current newsletter into a magazine, Camera Notes, and was given full control over the new publication. Its first issue was published in July 1897. It was soon considered the finest photographic magazine in the world. Over the next four years Stieglitz used Camera Notes to champion his belief in photography as an art form by including articles on art and aesthetics next to prints by some of the leading American and European photographers. Critic Sadakichi Hartmann wrote "it seemed to me that artistic photography, the Camera Club and Alfred Stieglitz were only three names for one and the same thing."

He also continued to take his own photographs. Late in 1896, he hand-pulled the photogravures for a first portfolio of his own work, Picturesque Bits of New York and Other Studies. He continued to exhibit in shows in Europe and the U.S., and by 1898 he had gained a solid reputation as a photographer. He was paid $75 (equivalent to $2,903 in 2025) for his favorite print, Winter – Fifth Avenue.

On September 27, 1898, Stieglitz's daughter, Katherine "Kitty", was born. Using Emmy's inheritance, the couple hired a governess, cook and a chambermaid. Stieglitz worked at the same pace as before the birth of his daughter, and as a result, the couple predominantly lived separate lives under the same roof.

In May 1899, Stieglitz was given a one-man exhibition, consisting of eighty-seven prints, at the Camera Club. The strain of preparing for this show, coupled with the continuing efforts to produce Camera Notes, took a toll on Stieglitz's health. To lessen his burden he brought in his friends Joseph Keiley and Dallet Fuguet, neither of whom were members of the Camera Club, as associate editors of Camera Notes. Upset by this intrusion from outsiders, not to mention their own diminishing presence in the Club's publication, many of the older members of the Club began to actively campaign against Stieglitz's editorial authority. Stieglitz spent most of 1900 finding ways to outmaneuver these efforts, embroiling him in protracted administrative battles.

Due to the continued strain of managing the Camera Club, by the following year he collapsed in the first of several mental breakdowns. He spent much of the summer at the family's Lake George home, Oaklawn, recuperating. When he returned to New York, he announced his resignation as editor of Camera Notes.

=== The Photo-Secession and Camera Work (1902–1907) ===
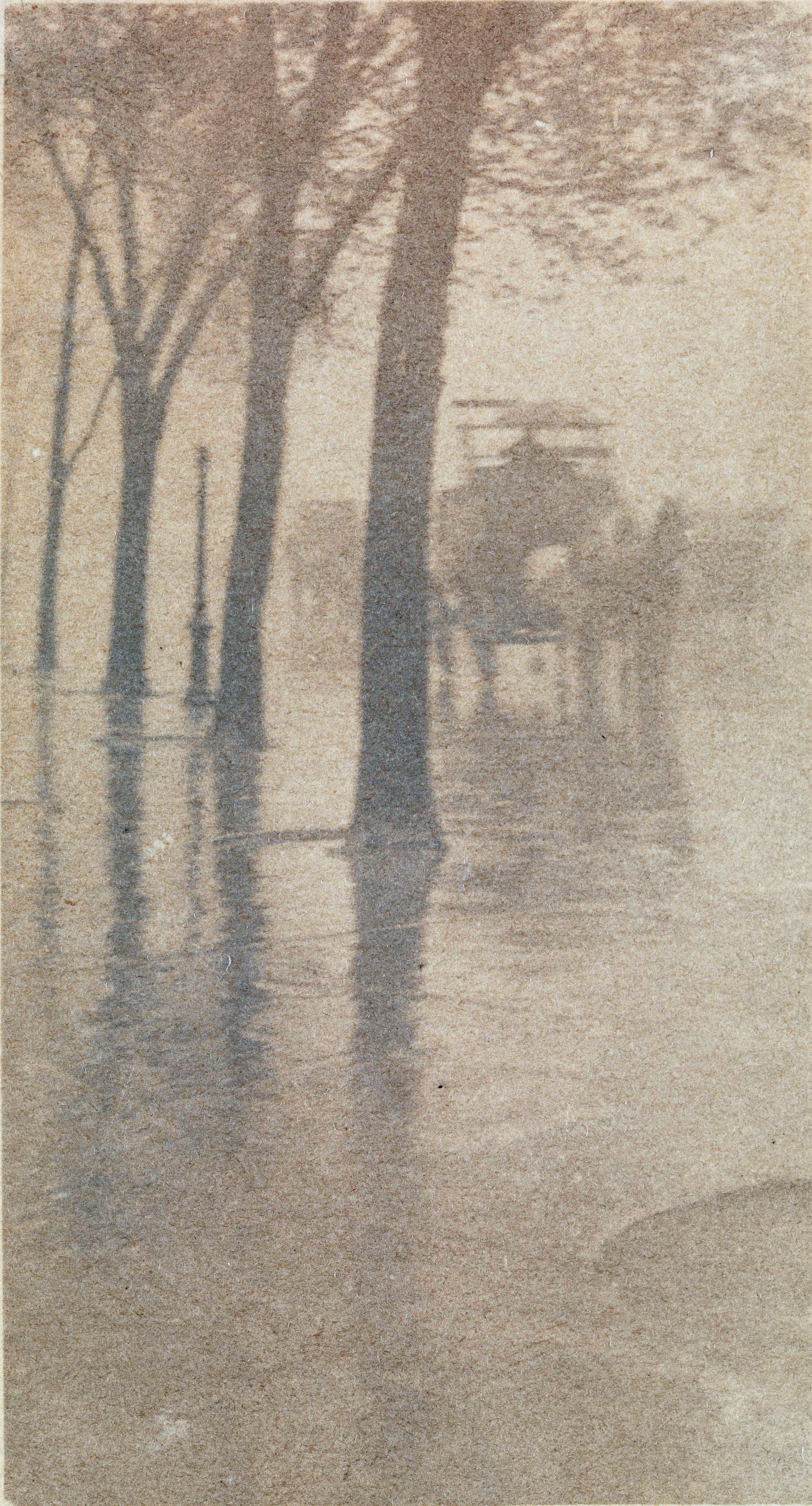
Spring Showers, The Coach (1899–1900) by Stieglitz

Photographer Eva Watson-Schütze urged him to establish an exhibition that would be judged solely by photographers who, unlike painters and other artists, knew about photography and its technical characteristics. In December 1901, he was invited by Charles DeKay of the National Arts Club to put together an exhibition in which Stieglitz would have "full power to follow his own inclinations." Within two months Stieglitz had assembled a collection of prints from a close circle of his friends, which, in homage to the Munich photographers, he called the Photo-Secession. Stieglitz was not only declaring a secession from the general artistic restrictions of the era, but specifically from the official oversight of the Camera Club.

He began formulating a plan to publish a completely independent magazine of pictorial photography to carry forth the artistic standards of the Photo-Secessionist. By July, he had fully resigned as editor of Camera Notes, and one month later he published a prospectus for a new journal he called Camera Work. He was determined it would be "the best and most sumptuous of photographic publications". The first issue was printed four months later, in December 1902, and like all of the subsequent issues it contained hand-pulled photogravures, critical writings on photography, aesthetics and art, and reviews and commentaries on photographers and exhibitions. Camera Work was "the first photographic journal to be visual in focus."

Stieglitz was a perfectionist, and it showed in every aspect of Camera Work. He advanced the art of photogravure printing by demanding unprecedentedly high standards for the prints in Camera Work. The visual quality of the gravures was so high that when a set of prints failed to arrive for a Photo-Secession exhibition in Brussels, a selection of gravures from the magazine was hung instead. Most viewers assumed they were looking at the original photographs.

Throughout 1903, Stieglitz published Camera Work and worked to exhibit his own work and that of the Photo-Secessionists while dealing with the stresses of his home life. Luxembourgish American photographer Edward Steichen, who later would curate the exhibit The Family of Man, was the most frequently featured photographer in the magazine. Fuguet, Keiley, and Strauss, Stieglitz's three associate editors at Camera Notes, he brought with him to Camera Work. Later, he said that he alone individually wrapped and mailed some 35,000 copies of Camera Work over the course of its publication.

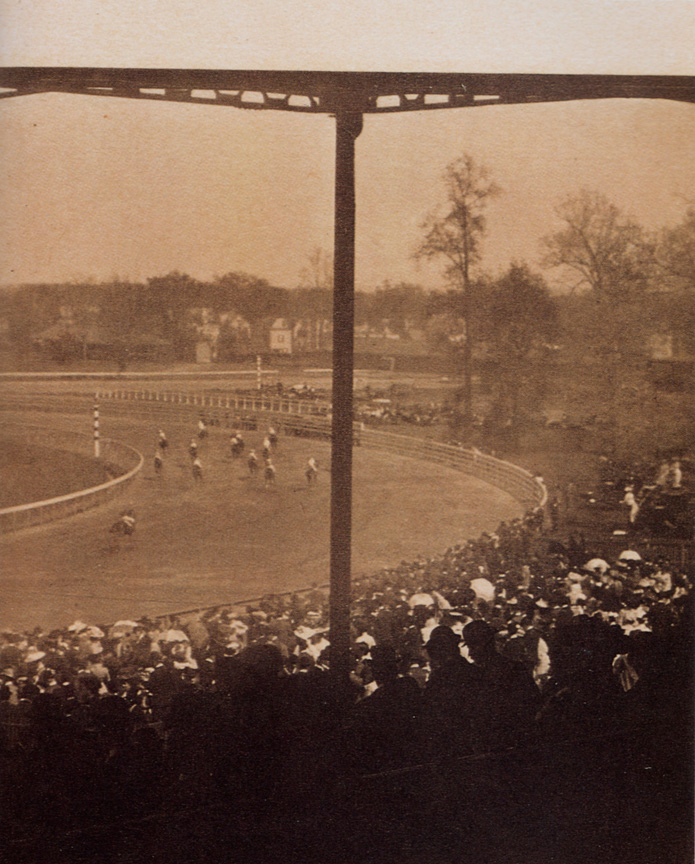
Going to the Start (1905) by Stieglitz

On November 25, 1905, the "Little Galleries of the Photo-Secession" opened at 291 Fifth Avenue with one hundred prints by thirty-nine photographers. Steichen had recommended and encouraged Stieglitz, on his return from Europe, to lease out three rooms across from Steichen's apartment that the pair felt would be perfect to exhibit photography. The gallery became an instant success, with almost fifteen thousand visitors during its first season and, more importantly, print sales that totaled nearly $2,800, more than half of those sales of Steichen's work.

Stieglitz continued to focus his efforts on photography, at the expense of his family. Emmy, who hoped she would one day earn Stieglitz's love, continued giving him an allowance from her inheritance.

In the October 1906 issue of Camera Work, his friend Joseph Keiley said: "Today in America the real battle for which the Photo-Secession was established has been accomplished – the serious recognition of photography as an additional medium of pictorial expression."

Two months later the 42-year-old Stieglitz met 28-year-old artist Pamela Colman Smith, who wished to have her drawings and watercolors shown at his gallery. He decided to show her work because he thought it would be "highly instructive to compare drawings and photographs in order to judge photography's possibilities and limitations". Her show opened in January 1907, with far more visitors to the gallery than any of the previous photography shows, and soon all of her exhibited works were sold. Stieglitz, hoping to capitalize on the popularity of the show, took photographs of her art work and issued a separate portfolio of his platinum prints of her work.

=== The Steerage, 291 and modern art (1907–1916) ===
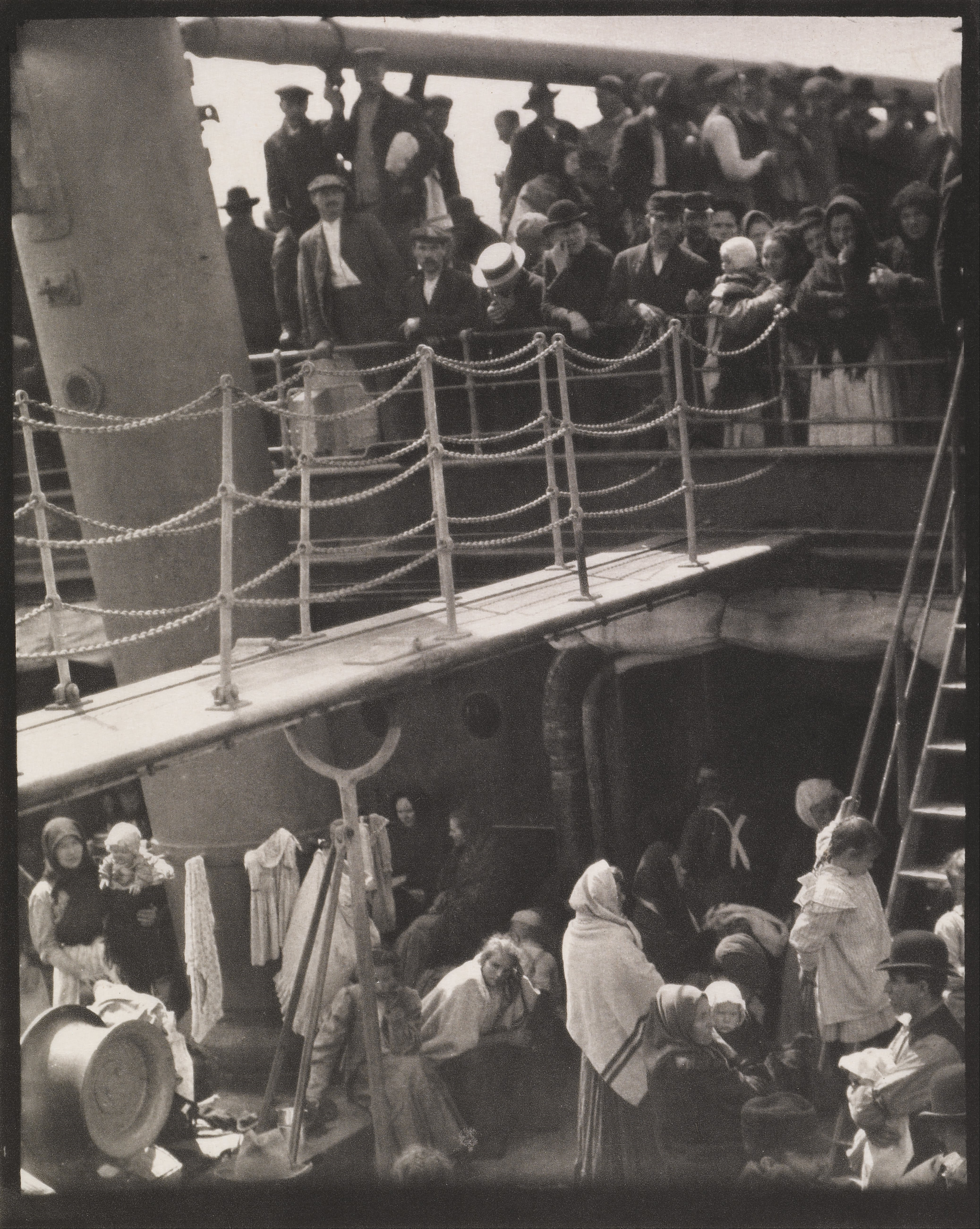
Stieglitz's The Steerage (1907)

In the late spring of 1907, Stieglitz collaborated on a series of photographic experiments with his friend Clarence H. White. They took several dozen photographs of two clothed and nude models and printed a selection using unusual techniques, including toning, waxing and drawing on platinum prints. According to Stieglitz, it overcame "the impossibility of the camera to do certain things."

He made less than $400 for the year due to declining Camera Work subscriptions and the gallery's low profit margin.

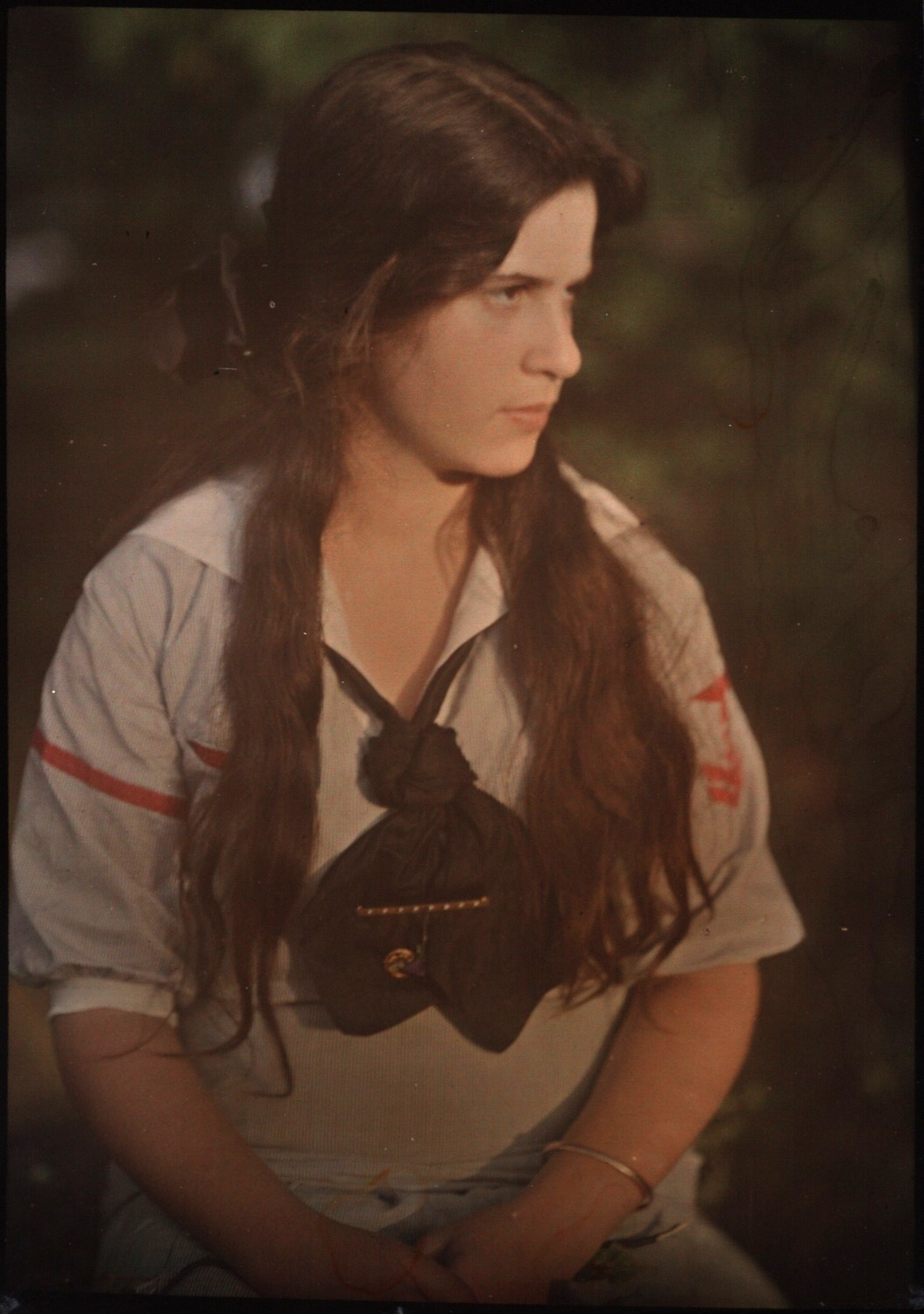
Katherine Stieglitz, autochrome, ca. 1910

While on his way to Europe, Stieglitz took what is recognized not only as his signature image but also as one of the most important photographs of the 20th century: The Steerage.

Stieglitz deliberately interspersed exhibitions of what he knew would be controversial art, such as Rodin's sexually explicit drawings, with what Steichen called "understandable art", and with photographs. The intention was to "set up a dialogue that would enable 291 visitors to see, discuss and ponder the differences and similarities between artists of all ranks and types: between painters, draftsmen, sculptors and photographers; between European and American artists; between older or more established figures and younger, newer practitioners." During this same period the National Arts Club mounted a "Special Exhibition of Contemporary Art" that included photographs by Stieglitz, Steichen, Käsebier and White along with paintings by Mary Cassatt, William Glackens, Robert Henri, James McNeill Whistler and others. This is thought to have been the first major show in the U.S. in which photographers were given equal ranking with painters.

For most of 1908 and 1909, Stieglitz spent his time creating shows at 291 and publishing Camera Work. There were no photographs taken during this period that appear in the definitive catalog of his work, Alfred Stieglitz: The Key Set.

In 1910, Stieglitz was invited by the director of the Albright Art Gallery to organize a major show of the best of contemporary photography. Although an announcement of an open competition for the show was printed in Camera Work, the fact that Stieglitz would be in charge of it generated a new round of attacks against him. An editorial in American Photography magazine claimed that Stieglitz could no longer "perceive the value of photographic work of artistic merit which does not conform to a particular style which is so characteristic of all exhibitions under his auspices. Half a generation ago this school [the Photo-Secession] was progressive, and far in advance of its time. Today it is not progressing, but is a reactionary force of the most dangerous type."

Stieglitz wrote to fellow photographer George Seeley "The reputation, not only of the Photo-Secession, but of photography is at stake, and I intend to muster all the forces available to win out for us."

Throughout 1911 and early 1912, Stieglitz organized ground-breaking modern art exhibits at 291 and promoted new art along with photography in the pages of Camera Work. By the summer of 1912, he was so enthralled with non-photographic art that he published an issue of Camera Work (August 1912) devoted solely to Matisse and Picasso.

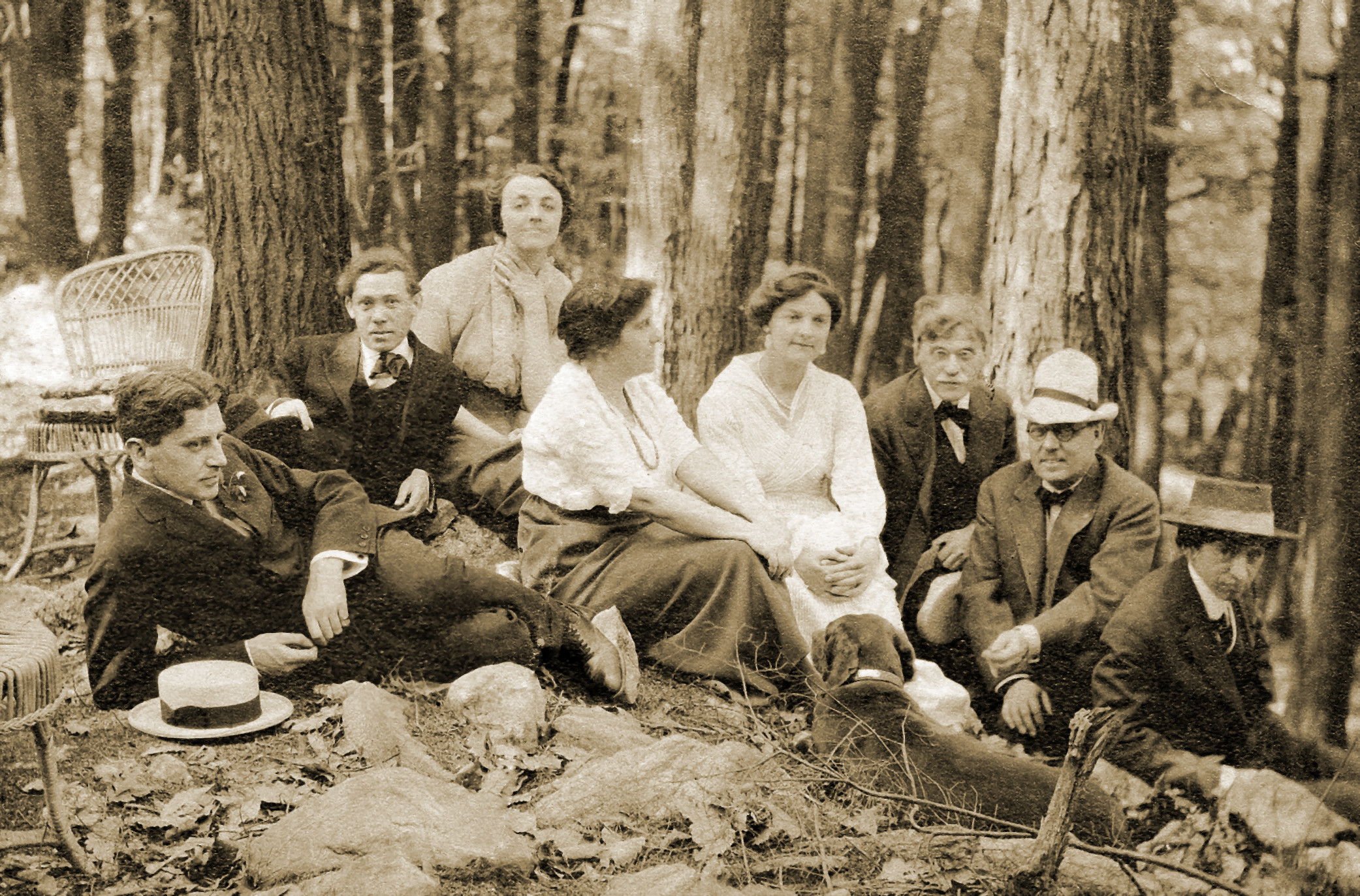
Group of artists in 1912, L to R : Paul Haviland, Abraham Walkowitz, Katharine Rhoades, Stieglitz's first wife Emily, Agnes Meyer, Alfred Stieglitz, John Barrett Kerfoot, John Marin

In late 1912, painters Walter Pach, Arthur B. Davies and Walt Kuhn organized a modern art show, and Stieglitz lent a few modern art pieces from 291 to the show. He also agreed to be listed as an honorary vice-president of the exhibition along with Claude Monet, Odilon Redon, Mabel Dodge and Isabella Stewart Gardner. In February 1913, the watershed Armory Show opened in New York, and soon modern art was a major topic of discussion throughout the city. He saw the popularity of the show as a vindication of the work that he had been sponsoring at 291 for the past five years. He mounted an exhibition of his own photographs at 291 to run at the same time as the Armory Show. He later wrote that allowing people to see both photographs and modern paintings at the same time "afforded the best opportunity to the student and public for a clearer understanding of the place and purpose of the two media."

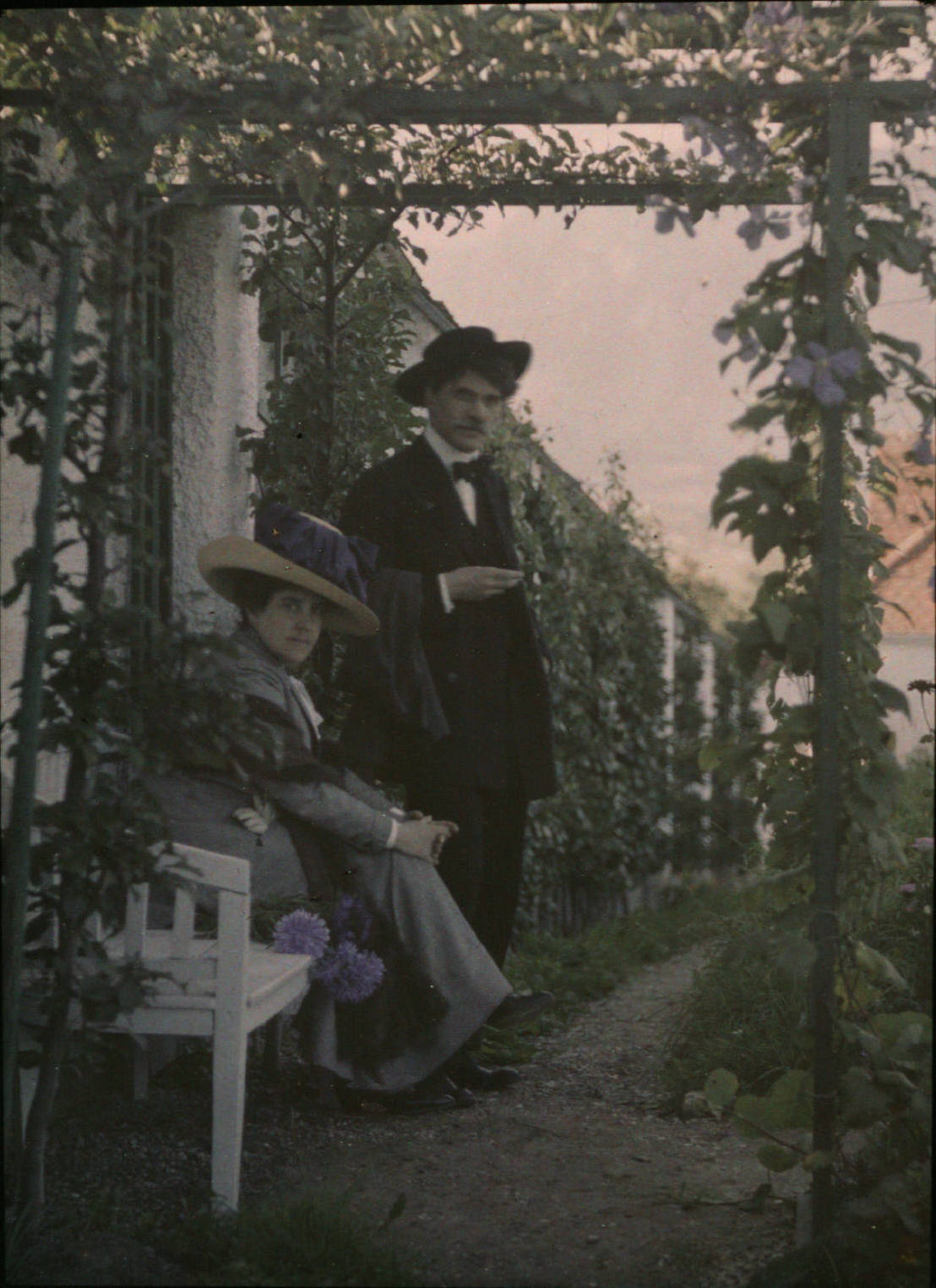
Autochrome portrait of Stieglitz and his wife Emily, ca. 1915. While attributed to Stieglitz, image may well be the work of Edward Steichen or Frank Eugene.

In January 1916, suffragist Anita Pollitzer showed Stieglitz a set of charcoal drawings by Georgia O'Keeffe. Stieglitz was so taken by her art that without meeting O'Keeffe or even getting her permission to show her works he made plans to exhibit her work at 291. The first that O'Keeffe heard about any of this was from another friend who saw her drawings in the gallery in late May of that year. She finally met Stieglitz after going to 291 and chastising him for showing her work without her permission.

Soon thereafter O'Keeffe met Paul Strand, and for several months she and Strand exchanged increasingly romantic letters. When Strand told his friend Stieglitz about his new yearning, Stieglitz responded by telling Strand about his own infatuation with O'Keeffe. Gradually Strand's interest waned, and Stieglitz's escalated. By the summer of 1917 he and O'Keeffe were writing each other "their most private and complicated thoughts".

=== O'Keeffe and modern art (1918–1924) ===
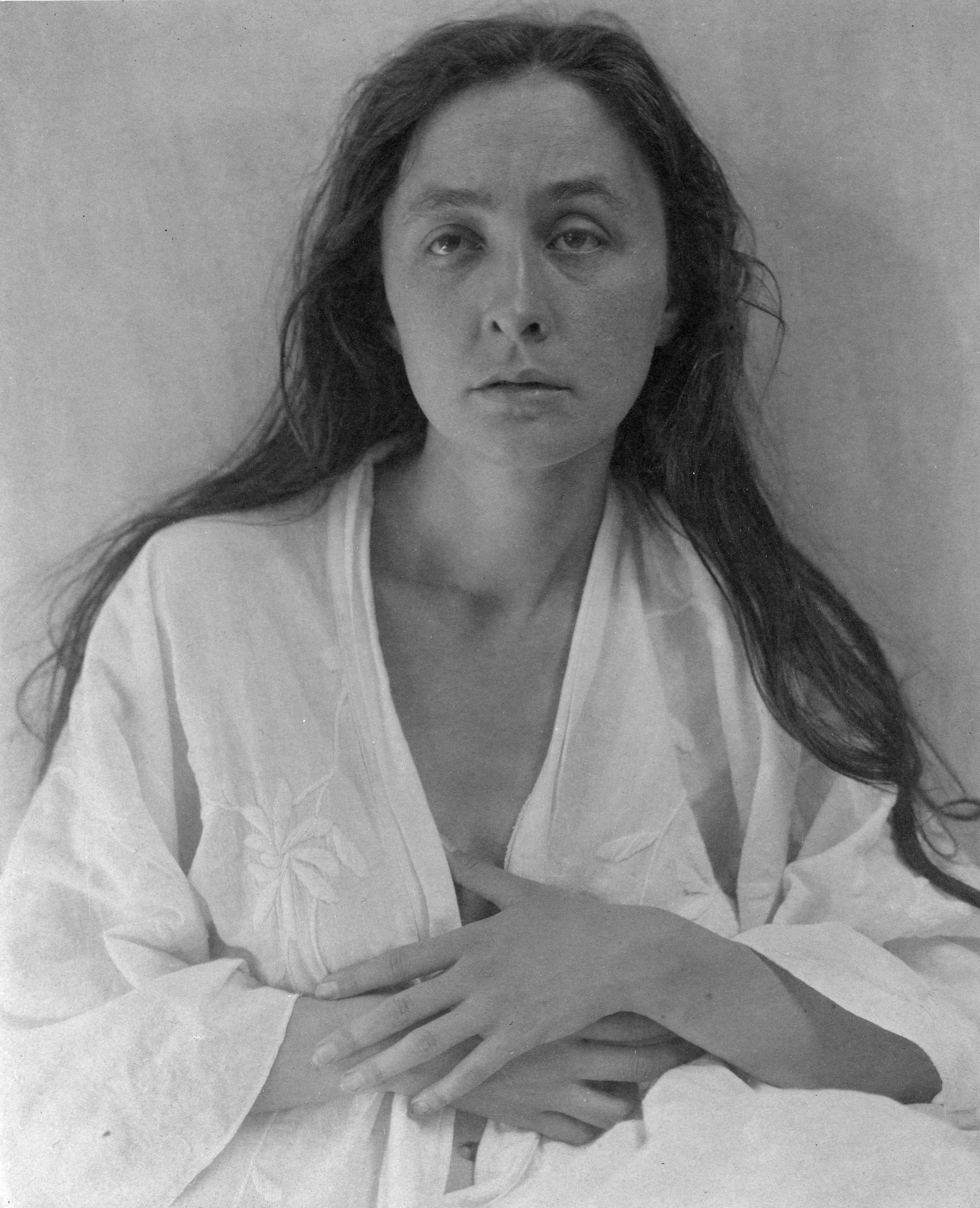
A Stieglitz portrait of Georgia O'Keeffe (1918)

In early June 1918, O'Keeffe moved to New York from Texas after Stieglitz promised he would provide her with a quiet studio where she could paint. Within a month he took the first of many nude photographs of her at his family's apartment while his wife Emmy was away, but she returned while their session was still in progress. She had suspected something was going on between the two for a while, and told him to stop seeing her or get out. Stieglitz left and immediately found a place in the city where he and O'Keeffe could live together. They slept separately for more than two weeks. By the end of July they were in the same bed together, and by mid-August when they visited Oaklawn "they were like two teenagers in love. Several times a day they would run up the stairs to their bedroom, so eager to make love that they would start taking their clothes off as they ran."

O'Keeffe was the muse Stieglitz had always wanted. He photographed O'Keeffe obsessively between 1918 and 1925 in what was the most prolific period in his entire life. During this period he produced more than 350 mounted prints of O'Keeffe that portrayed a wide range of her character, moods and beauty. He shot many close-up studies of parts of her body, especially her hands either isolated by themselves or near her face or hair. O'Keeffe biographer Roxanna Robinson states that her "personality was crucial to these photographs; it was this, as much as her body, that Stieglitz was recording."

In 1920, Stieglitz was invited by Mitchell Kennerly of the Anderson Galleries in New York to put together a major exhibition of his photographs. In early 1921, he hung the first one-man exhibit of his photographs since 1913. Of the 146 prints he put on view, only 17 had been seen before. Forty-six were of O'Keeffe, including many nudes, but she was not identified as the model on any of the prints. It was in the catalog for this show that Stieglitz made his famous declaration: "I was born in Hoboken. I am an American. Photography is my passion. The search for Truth my obsession." What is less known is that he conditioned this statement by following it with these words:

PLEASE NOTE: In the above STATEMENT the following, fast becoming "obsolete", terms do not appear: ART, SCIENCE, BEAUTY, RELIGION, every ISM, ABSTRACTION, FORM, PLASTICITY, OBJECTIVITY, SUBJECTIVITY, OLD MASTERS, MODERN ART, PSYCHOANALYSIS, AESTHETICS, PICTORIAL PHOTOGRAPHY, DEMOCRACY, CEZANNE, "291", PROHIBITION. The term TRUTH did creep in but it may be kicked out by any one.

In 1922, Stieglitz organized a large show of John Marin's paintings and etching at the Anderson Galleries, followed by a huge auction of nearly two hundred paintings by more than forty American artists, including O'Keeffe. Energized by this activity, he began one of his most creative and unusual undertakings – photographing a series of cloud studies simply for their form and beauty. He said:

I wanted to photograph clouds to find out what I had learned in forty years about photography. Through clouds to put down my philosophy of life – to show that (the success of) my photographs (was) not due to subject matter – not to special trees or faces, or interiors, to special privileges – clouds were there for everyone…

Stieglitz's mother Hedwig died in November 1922, and as he did with his father he buried his grief in his work. He spent time with Paul Strand and wife, painter Rebecca Salsbury, reviewed the work of another newcomer named Edward Weston and began organizing a new show of O'Keeffe's work. Her show opened in early 1923, and Stieglitz spent much of the spring marketing her work. Eventually twenty of her paintings sold for more than $3,000. In the summer, O'Keeffe once again took off for the seclusion of the Southwest, and for a while Stieglitz was alone with Salsbury at Lake George. He took a series of nude photos of her, and soon he became infatuated with her. They had a brief physical affair before O'Keeffe returned in the fall. O'Keeffe could tell what had happened, but since she did not see Stieglitz's new lover as a serious threat to their relationship she let things pass. Six years later she would have her own affair with Salsbury in New Mexico.

In 1924, Stieglitz's divorce was finally approved by a judge, and within four months he and O'Keeffe married in a small, private ceremony at Marin's house. They went home without a reception or honeymoon. O'Keeffe said later that they married in order to help soothe the troubles of Stieglitz's daughter Kitty, who at that time was being treated in a sanatorium for depression and hallucinations. For the rest of their lives together, their relationship was, as biographer Benita Eisler characterized it, "a collusion ... a system of deals and trade-offs, tacitly agreed to and carried out, for the most part, without the exchange of a word. Preferring avoidance to confrontation on most issues, O'Keeffe was the principal agent of collusion in their union."

In the coming years O'Keeffe would spend much of her time painting in New Mexico, while Stieglitz rarely left New York except for summers at his father's family estate in Lake George in the Adirondacks, his favorite vacation place. O'Keeffe later said "Stieglitz was a hypochondriac and couldn't be more than 50 miles from a doctor."

At the end of 1924, Stieglitz donated 27 photographs to the Boston Museum of Fine Arts. It was the first time a major museum included photographs in its permanent collection. In the same year he was awarded the Royal Photographic Society's Progress Medal for advancing photography and received an Honorary Fellowship of the Society.

=== The Intimate Gallery and An American Place (1925–1937) ===
In 1925, Stieglitz was invited by the Anderson Galleries to put together one of the largest exhibitions of American art, entitled Alfred Stieglitz Presents Seven Americans: 159 Paintings, Photographs, and Things, Recent and Never Before Publicly Shown by Arthur G. Dove, Marsden Hartley, John Marin, Charles Demuth, Paul Strand, Georgia O'Keeffe and Alfred Stieglitz. Only one small painting by O'Keeffe was sold during the three-week exhibit.

O'Keeffe accepted an offer by Mabel Dodge to go to New Mexico for the summer. Stieglitz took advantage of her time away to begin photographing Dorothy Norman, and he began teaching her the technical aspects of printing as well. When Norman had a second child, she was absent from the gallery for about two months before returning on a regular basis.

In early 1929, Stieglitz was told that the building that housed the Room would be torn down later in the year. After a final show of Demuth's work in May, he retreated to Lake George for the summer, exhausted and depressed. The Strands raised nearly sixteen thousand dollars for a new gallery for Stieglitz, who reacted harshly, saying it was time for "young ones" to do some of the work he had been shouldering for so many years.

In the late fall, Stieglitz returned to New York. On December 15, two weeks before his sixty-fifth birthday, he opened "An American Place", the largest gallery he had ever managed. It had the first darkroom he had ever had in the city. Previously, he had borrowed other darkrooms or worked only when he was at Lake George. He continued showing group or individual shows of his friends Marin, Demuth, Hartley, Dove and Strand for the next sixteen years. O'Keeffe received at least one major exhibition each year. He fiercely controlled access to her works and incessantly promoted her even when critics gave her less than favorable reviews. Often during this time, they would only see each other during the summer, when it was too hot in her New Mexico home, but they wrote to each other almost weekly with the fervor of soul mates.

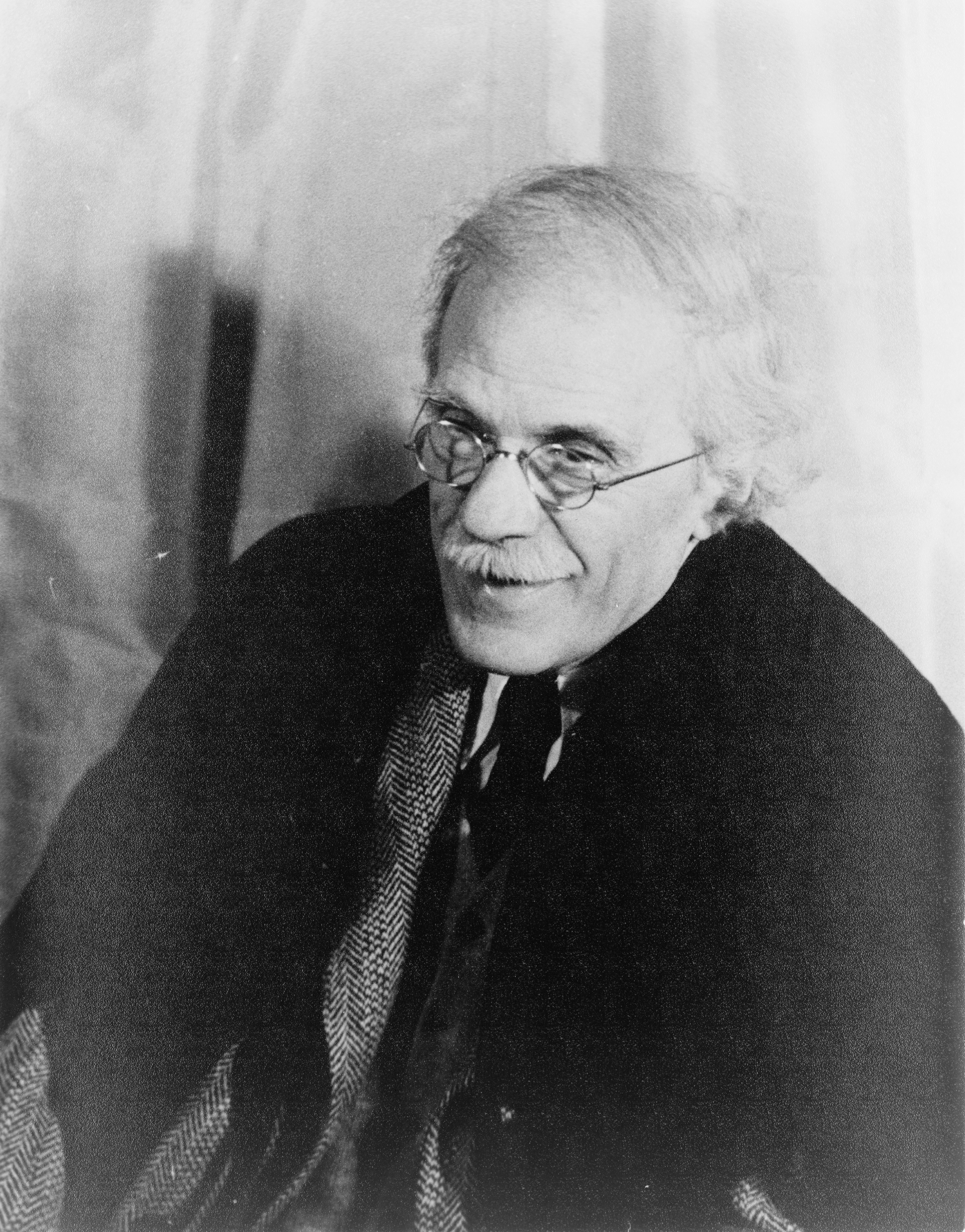
Stieglitz in 1935, photographed by Carl Van Vechten

In 1932, Stieglitz mounted a forty-year retrospective of 127 of his works at The Place. He included all of his most famous photographs, but he also purposely chose to include recent photos of O'Keeffe, who, because of her years in the Southwest sun, looked older than her forty-five years, in comparison to Stieglitz's portraits of his young lover Norman. It was one of the few times he acted spitefully to O'Keeffe in public, and it might have been as a result of their increasingly intense arguments in private about his control over her art.

Later that year, he mounted a show of O'Keeffe's works next to some amateurish paintings on glass by Rebecca Salsbury. He did not publish a catalog of the show, which the Strands took as an insult. Paul Strand never forgave Stieglitz for that. He said, "The day I walked into the Photo-Secession 291 [sic] in 1907 was a great moment in my life… but the day I walked out of An American Place in 1932 was not less good. It was fresh air and personal liberation from something that had become, for me at least, second-rate, corrupt and meaningless."

In 1936, Stieglitz returned briefly to his photographic roots by mounting one of the first exhibitions of photos by Ansel Adams in New York City. The show was successful and David McAlpin bought eight Adams photos. He also put on one of the first shows of Eliot Porter's work two years later. Stieglitz, considered the "godfather of modern photography", encouraged Todd Webb to develop his own style and immerse himself in the medium.

=== Last years (1938–1946) ===
In the summer of 1946, Stieglitz suffered a fatal stroke and went into a coma. O'Keeffe returned to New York and found Dorothy Norman in his hospital room. Norman left and O'Keeffe was with him when he died. According to his wishes, a simple funeral was attended by twenty of his closest friends and family members. Stieglitz was cremated, and, with his niece Elizabeth Davidson, O'Keeffe took his ashes to Lake George and "put him where he could hear the water." The day after the funeral, O'Keeffe took control of An American Place.

== Key set ==
Stieglitz produced more than 2,500 mounted photographs over his career. After his death, O'Keeffe assembled a set of what she considered the best of his photographs that he had personally mounted. In some cases she included slightly different versions of the same image, and these series are invaluable for their insights about Stieglitz's aesthetic composition. In 1949, she donated the first part of what she called the "key set" of 1,317 Stieglitz photographs to the National Gallery of Art in Washington, DC. In 1980, she added to the set another 325 photographs taken by Stieglitz of her, including many nudes. Now numbering 1,642 photographs, it is the largest, most complete collection of Stieglitz's work. In 2002 the National Gallery published a two-volume, 1,012-page catalog that reproduced the complete key set along with detailed annotations about each photograph.

To celebrate the publication of The Key Set, the Gallery exhibited Alfred Stieglitz, an exhibition of “…99 photographs and 3 volumes chronicled Alfred Stieglitz's artistic development by showing familiar images along with photographs that had not been exhibited during the past 50 years.” The exhibition ran 2 June–2 September 2, 2002, and traveled to Museum of Fine Arts, Houston (exhibited 6 October 2002–5 January 2003).

In 2019, the National Gallery published an updated, Online Edition of the Alfred Stieglitz Key Set.

== Legacy ==
- Stieglitz explained in 1934:

"Personally I like my photography straight, unmanipulated, devoid of all tricks; a print not looking like anything but a photograph, living through its own inherent qualities and revealing its own spirit."

- "Alfred Stieglitz (1864–1946) is perhaps the most important figure in the history of visual arts in America. That is certainly not to say that he was the greatest artist America has ever produced. Rather, through his many roles – as a photographer, as a discoverer and promoter of photographers and of artists in other media, and as a publisher, patron, and collector – he had a greater impact on American art than any other person has had."
- "Alfred Stieglitz had the multifold abilities of a Renaissance man. A visionary of enormously wide perspective, his accomplishments were remarkable, his dedication awe-inspiring. A photographer of genius, a publisher of inspiration, a writer of great ability, a gallery owner and exhibition organizer of both photographic and modern art exhibitions, a catalyst and a charismatic leader in the photographic and art worlds for over thirty years, he was, necessarily, a passionate, complex, driven and highly contradictory character, both prophet and martyr. The ultimate maverick, he inspired great love and great hatred in equal measure."
- Eight of the nine highest prices ever paid at auction for Stieglitz photographs (as of 2008) are images of Georgia O'Keeffe. The highest-priced photograph, a 1919 palladium print of Georgia O'Keeffe – Hands, realized US$1.47 million at auction in February 2006. At the same sale, Georgia O'Keeffe – Torso, another 1919 print, sold for $1.36 million.
- A large number of his works are held at the Minneapolis Institute of Art.
- In 1971 Stieglitz was posthumously inducted into the International Photography Hall of Fame and Museum.
- In 2012, the IAU named a crater on the planet Mercury after Stieglitz.

== Gallery ==
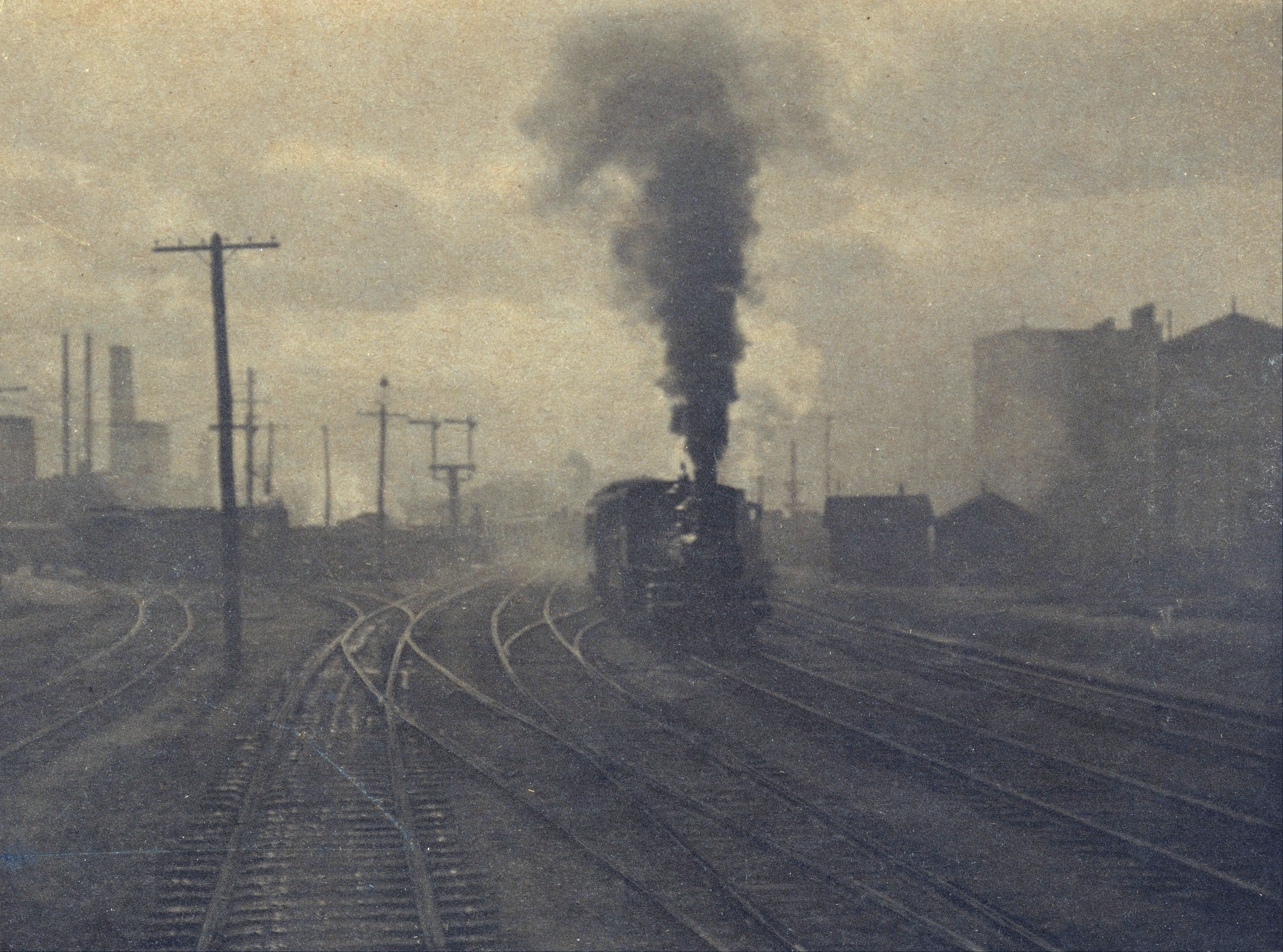
The Hand of Man, 1902

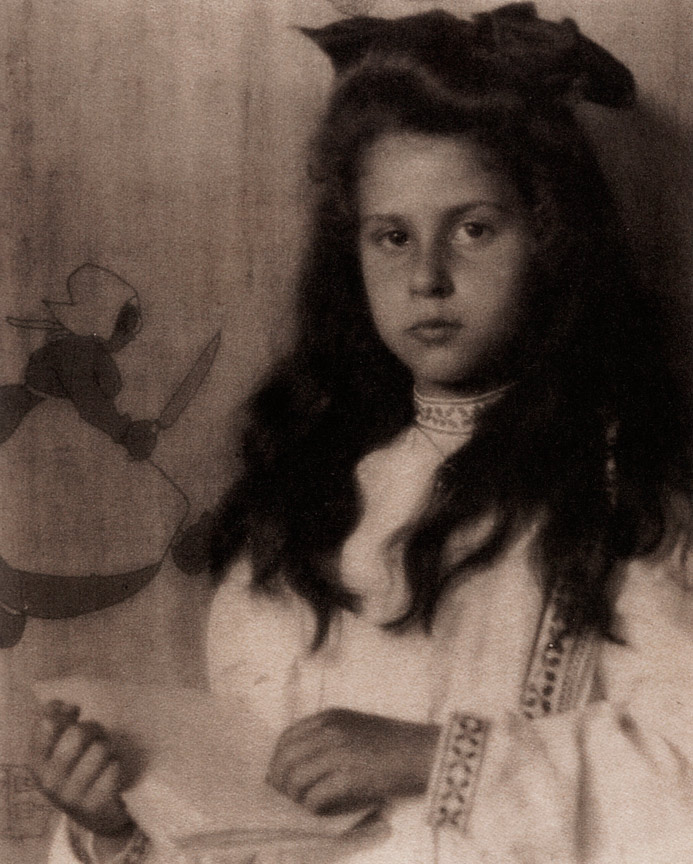
Katherine, 1905

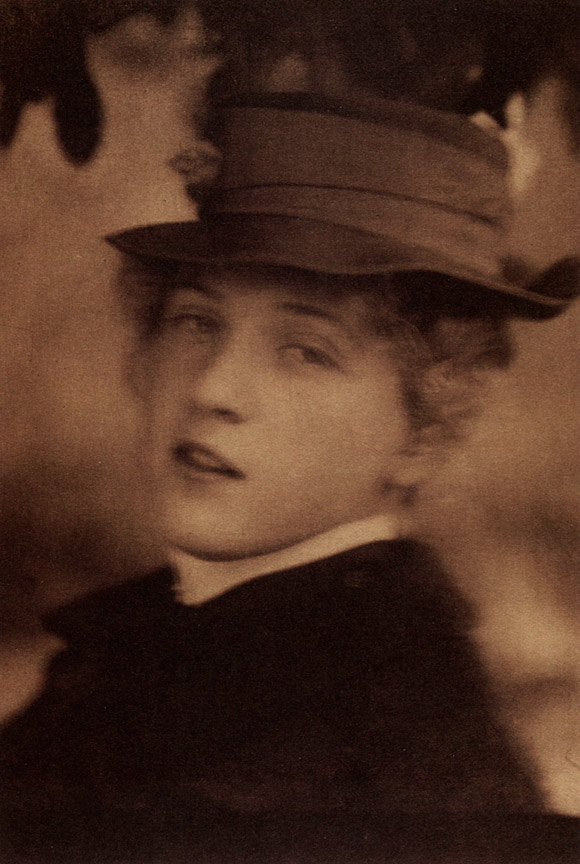
Miss S.R., 1905

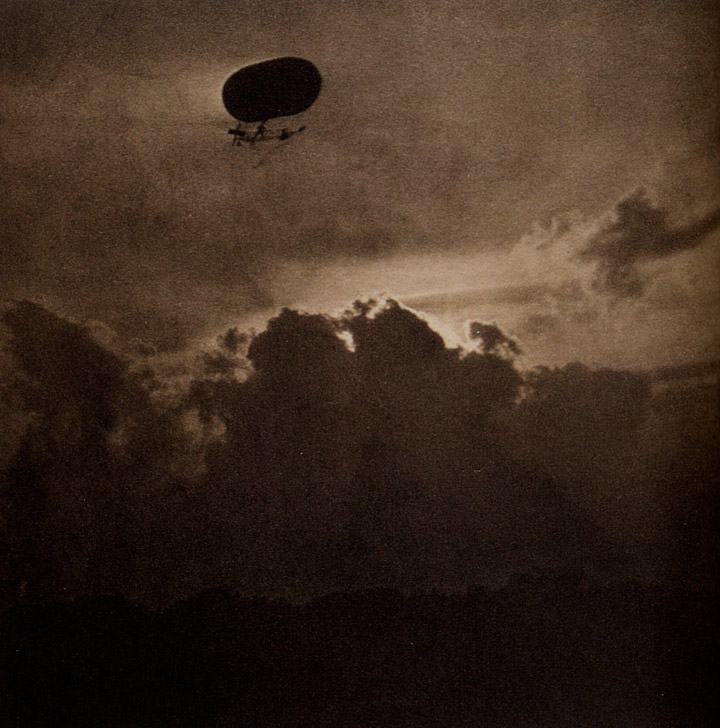
Dirigible, 1910

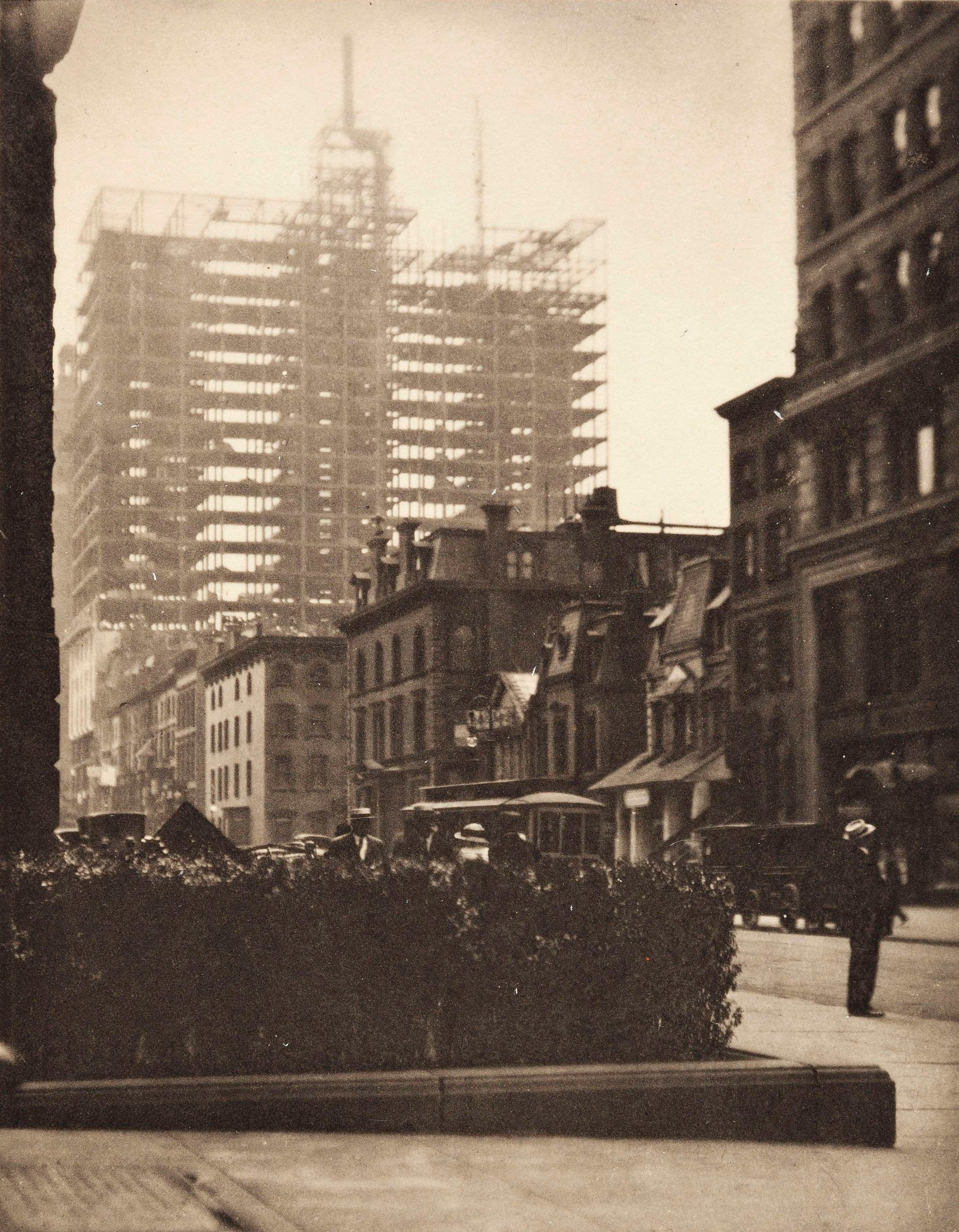
Old and New New York, 1910

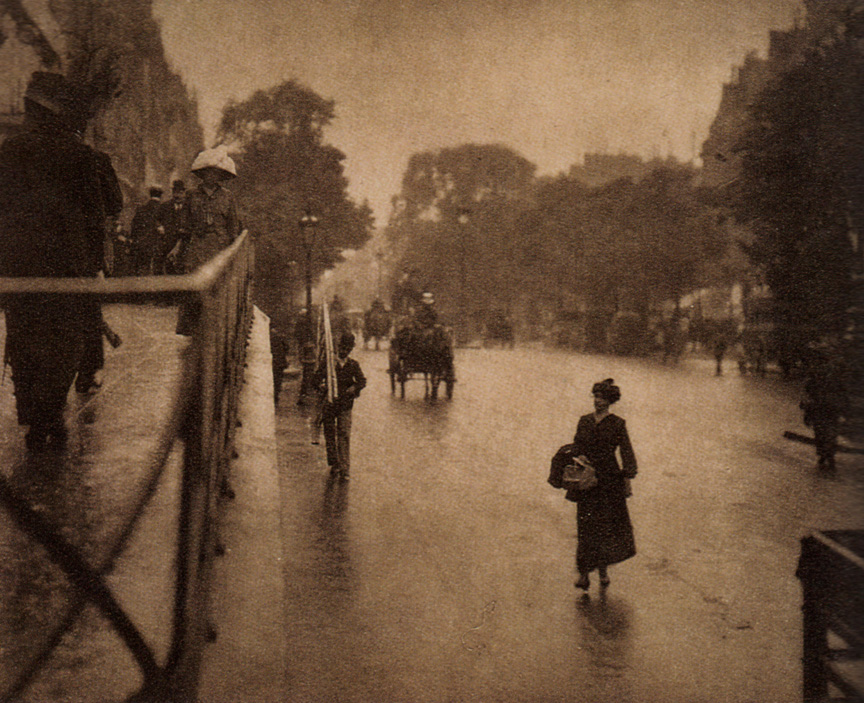
A Snapshot: Paris, 1911
(one of two with same title)

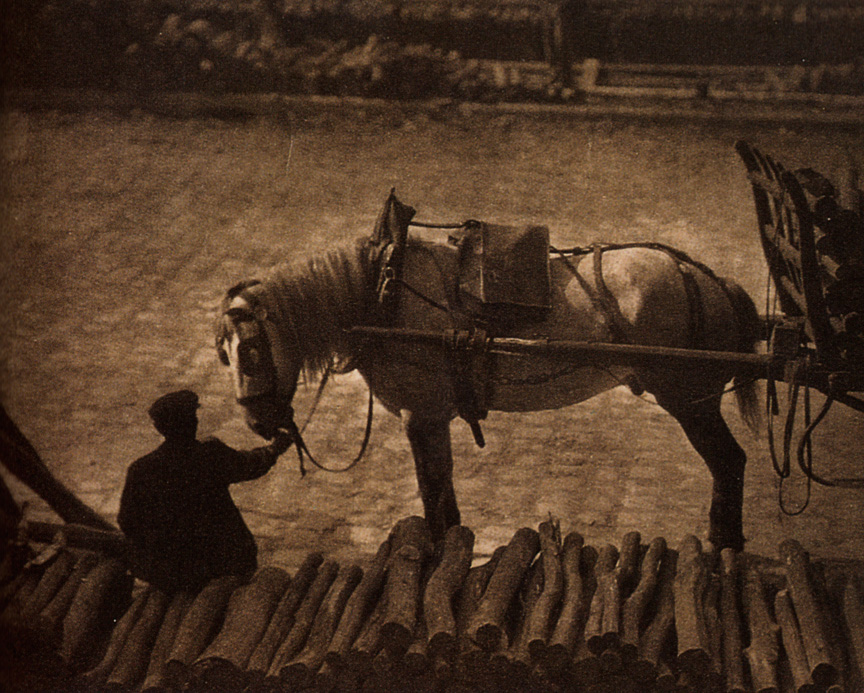
A Snapshot: Paris, 1911
(one of two with same title)

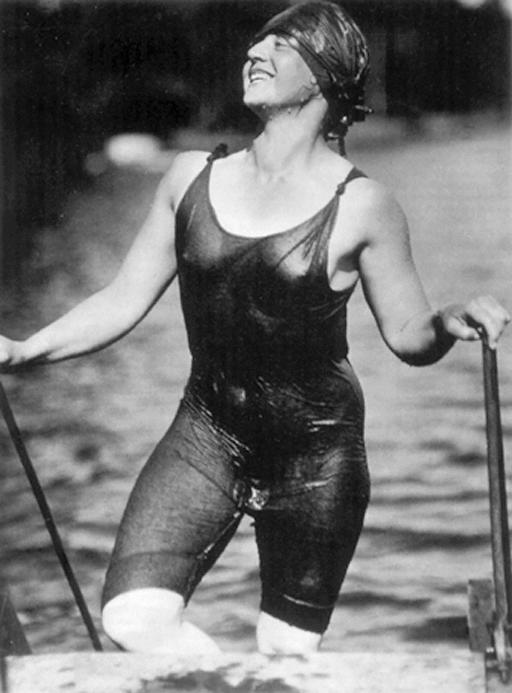
Ellen Koeniger, Lake George, 1916.

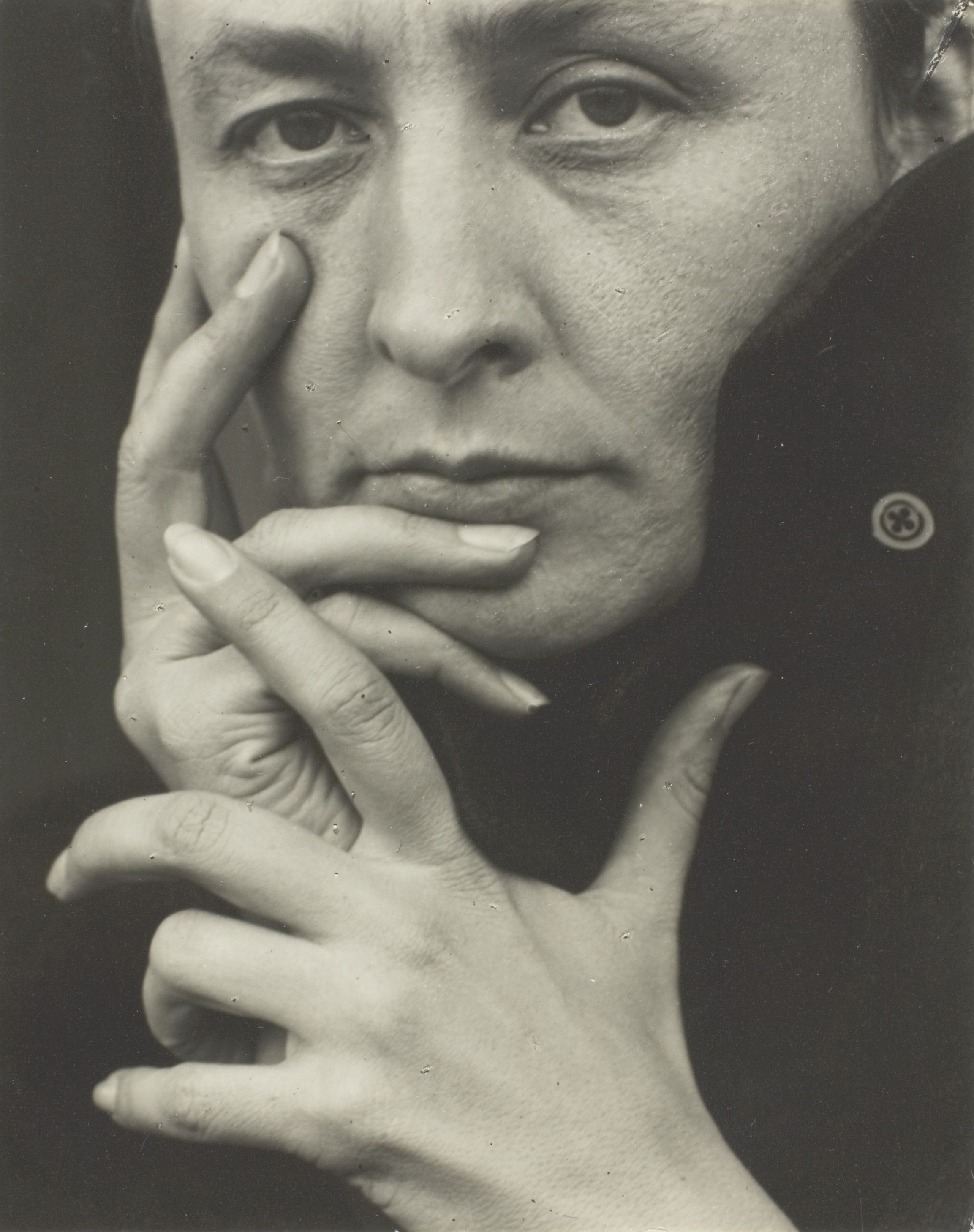
Georgia O'Keeffe, Hands, 1918

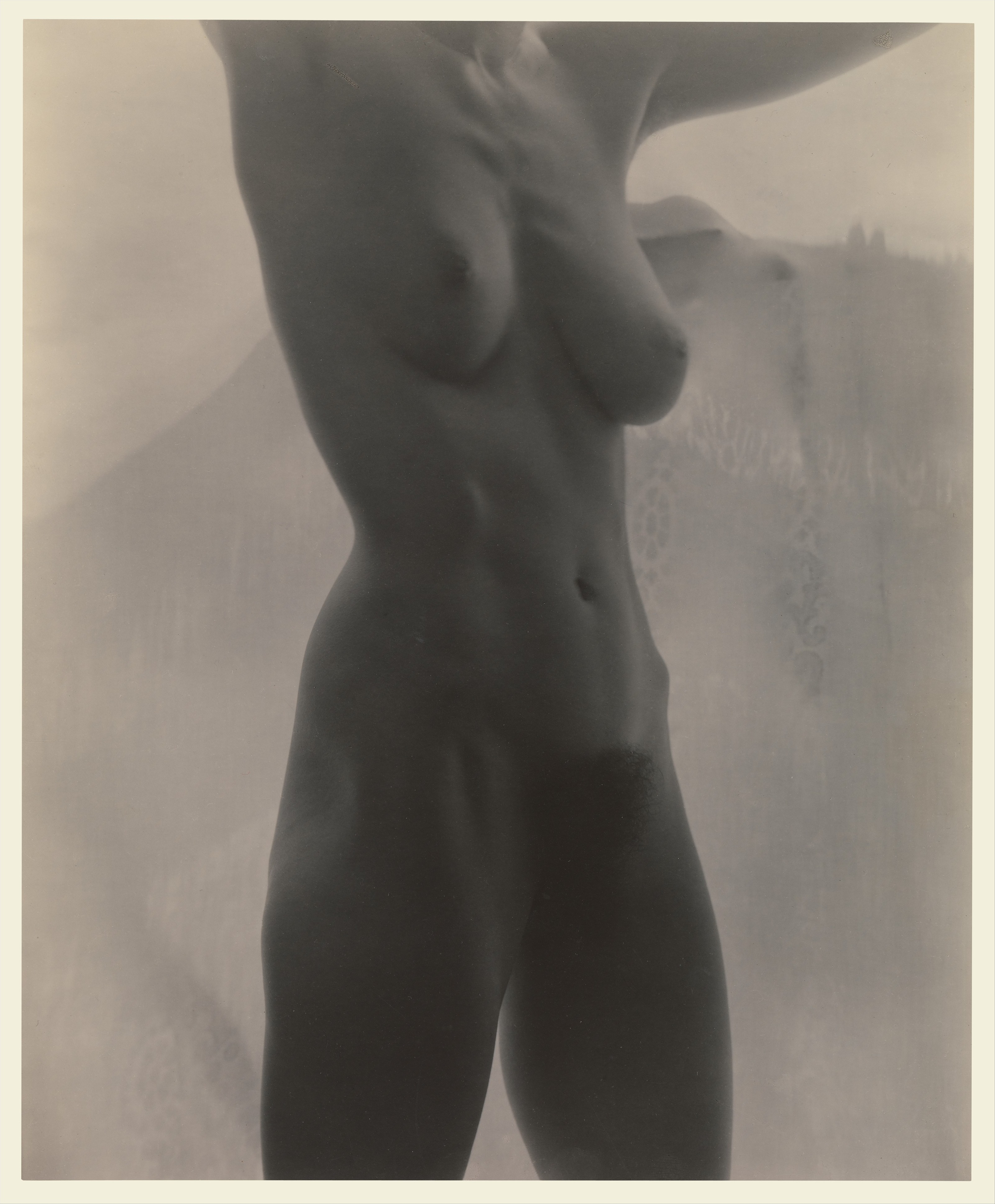
Torso, 1918

== See also ==
- Equivalents (1925–1934)
- Photography in the United States
- List of Camera Work issues
