= Georgia O'Keeffe – Hands =

Photograph by Alfred Stieglitz

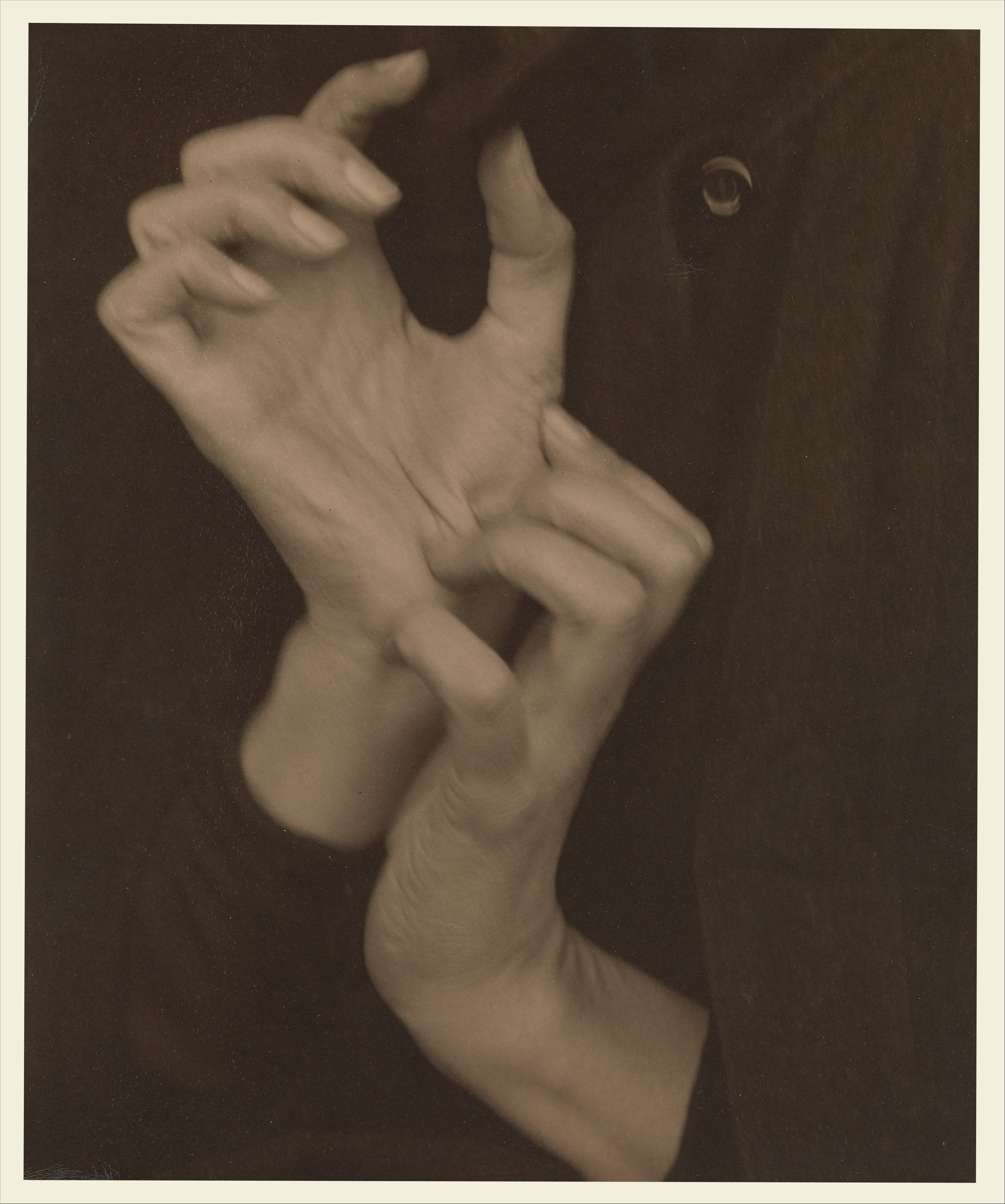
Georgia O'Keeffe – Hands (1919) by Alfred Stieglitz

Georgia O'Keeffe – Hands, also known as Georgia O'Keeffe (Hands), is a black and white photograph taken by Alfred Stieglitz in 1919. It is part of a large group of more than 300 photographs that he took of the painter Georgia O'Keeffe, from 1917 prior to their 1924 marriage, through 1937.

== History and description ==
Stieglitz took several pictures of O'Keeffe hands around 1919, and this is one of the better known. He was interested in exploring the portraiture of his model, often without showing her face, but other parts of her body, like her hands, feet and torso. Her hands attracted him particularly because they were the creators of the art that he admired. In this picture, O'Keeffe is dressed in black and gives the picture a totally dark background. She does an artistic and dramatic gesture, as she pauses her right hand at the bottom of her left hand, with the fingers in both hands partially bended.

== Art market ==
This picture was the most expensive photograph of the artist ever sold, when auctioned for $1,472,000 at Sotheby's New York on 14 February 2006.

== Public collections ==
There are prints of this photograph at the Metropolitan Museum of Art, in New York, the National Gallery of Art, in Washington, D.C., the Library of Congress, in Washington, D.C., the Philadelphia Museum of Art, and the George Eastman House, in Rochester.

== See also ==
- Georgia O'Keeffe – Torso, 1918
