= The Washington Post =

American daily newspaper

- Democracy Dies in Darkness

- The Washington Post print edition on June 10, 2020
- Type: Daily newspaper
- Format: Broadsheet
- Owner: Nash Holdings (Jeff Bezos)
- Founder: Stilson Hutchins
- Publisher: Jeff D'Onofrio
- Editor-in-chief: Matt Murray
- Staff writers: ~500 journalists (2026)
- Founded: December 6, 1877; 148 years ago
- Language: English
- Headquarters: One Franklin Square, 1301 K Street NW, Washington, D.C., U.S.
- Country: United States
- Circulation: 2,500,000 digital subscribers 77,900 Average print circulation
- ISSN: 0190-8286 (print); 2641-9599 (web)
- OCLC number: 2269358
- Website: washingtonpost.com

The Washington Post is an American daily newspaper published in Washington, D.C. It is the most widely circulated newspaper outlet in the Washington metropolitan area and is considered a newspaper of record in the United States. In 2023, the Post had 130,000 print subscribers and 2.5 million digital subscribers, both ranking third among American newspapers after The New York Times and The Wall Street Journal. In 2025, the number of print subscribers sank below 100,000 for the first time in 55 years.

Locally known as The Post and informally as WaPo or WP, the paper was founded in 1877. In its early years, it went through several owners and struggled financially and editorially. In 1933, financier Eugene Meyer purchased it out of bankruptcy and revived its health and reputation; his successors Katharine and Phil Graham, Meyer's daughter and son-in-law, bought out several rival publications and continued this work. The Post's 1971 printing of the Pentagon Papers helped spur opposition to the Vietnam War. Reporters Bob Woodward and Carl Bernstein led the investigation into the break-in at the Democratic National Committee, which developed into the Watergate scandal and the 1974 resignation of President Richard Nixon. In October 2013, the Graham family sold the newspaper to Nash Holdings, a holding company owned by Jeff Bezos, for US$250 million.

The newspaper has won 76 Pulitzer Prizes, second only to The New York Times. Washington Post journalists have received 18 Nieman Fellowships and 368 White House News Photographers Association awards. Well known for its political reporting in the U.S., it is one of the few American newspapers that still operate foreign bureaus, with international breaking news hubs in London and Seoul.

== Bureaus and circulation ==
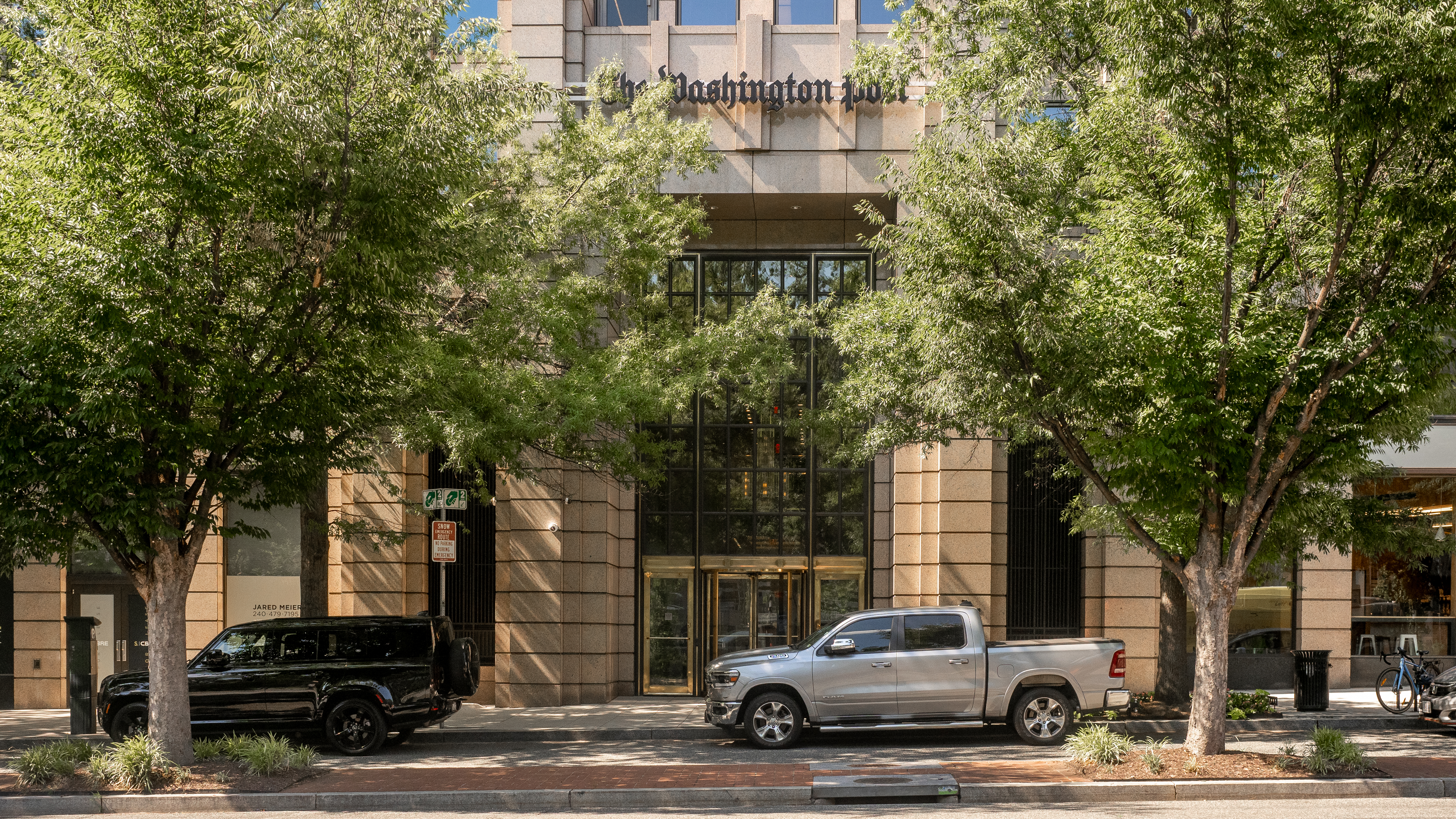
Headquarters of The Washington Post at One Franklin Square

As of 2021, the newspaper had 21 foreign bureaus: Baghdad, Beijing, Beirut, Berlin, Brussels, Cairo, Dakar, Hong Kong, Islamabad, Istanbul, Jerusalem, London, Mexico City, Moscow, Nairobi, New Delhi, Rio de Janeiro, Rome, Seoul, Tokyo, and Toronto. The newspaper has local bureaus in Maryland (Annapolis, Montgomery County, Prince George's County, and Southern Maryland) and Virginia (Alexandria, Fairfax, Loudoun County, Richmond, and Prince William County). In 2009, the newspaper closed three U.S. regional bureaus—in Chicago, Los Angeles, and New York City—as part of an increased focus on Washington, D.C.–based political stories and local news.

The Washington Post does not print an edition for distribution outside the East Coast. In 2009, the newspaper ceased publication of its National Weekly Edition due to shrinking circulation. The majority of its newsprint readership is in Washington, D.C., and its suburbs in Maryland and Northern Virginia. As of March 2023, the Post's average printed weekday circulation was 139,232, making it the third-largest newspaper in the country by circulation.

For many decades, the Post had its main office at 1150 15th Street NW. This real estate remained with Graham Holdings when the newspaper was sold to Jeff Bezos' Nash Holdings in 2013. Graham Holdings sold 1150 15th Street, along with 1515 L Street, 1523 L Street, and land beneath 1100 15th Street, for $159 million in November 2013. The Post continued to lease space at 1150 L Street NW. In May 2014, The Post leased the west tower of One Franklin Square, a high-rise building at 1301 K Street NW in Washington, D.C. The Post has its own ZIP Code, 20071.

== History ==
=== 19th century ===
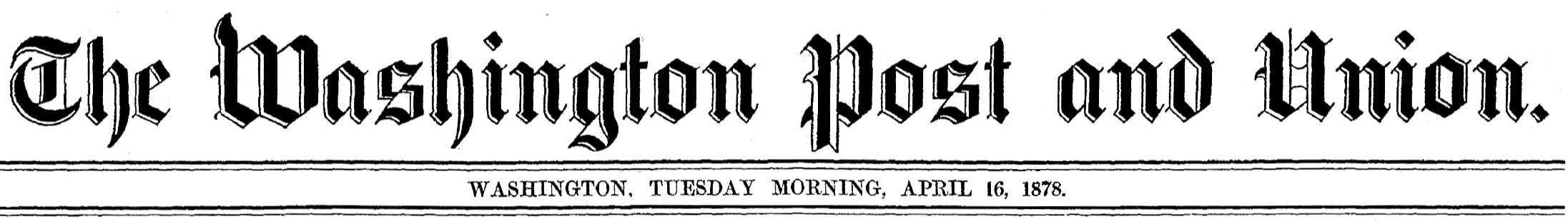
The Washington Post and Union in 1878

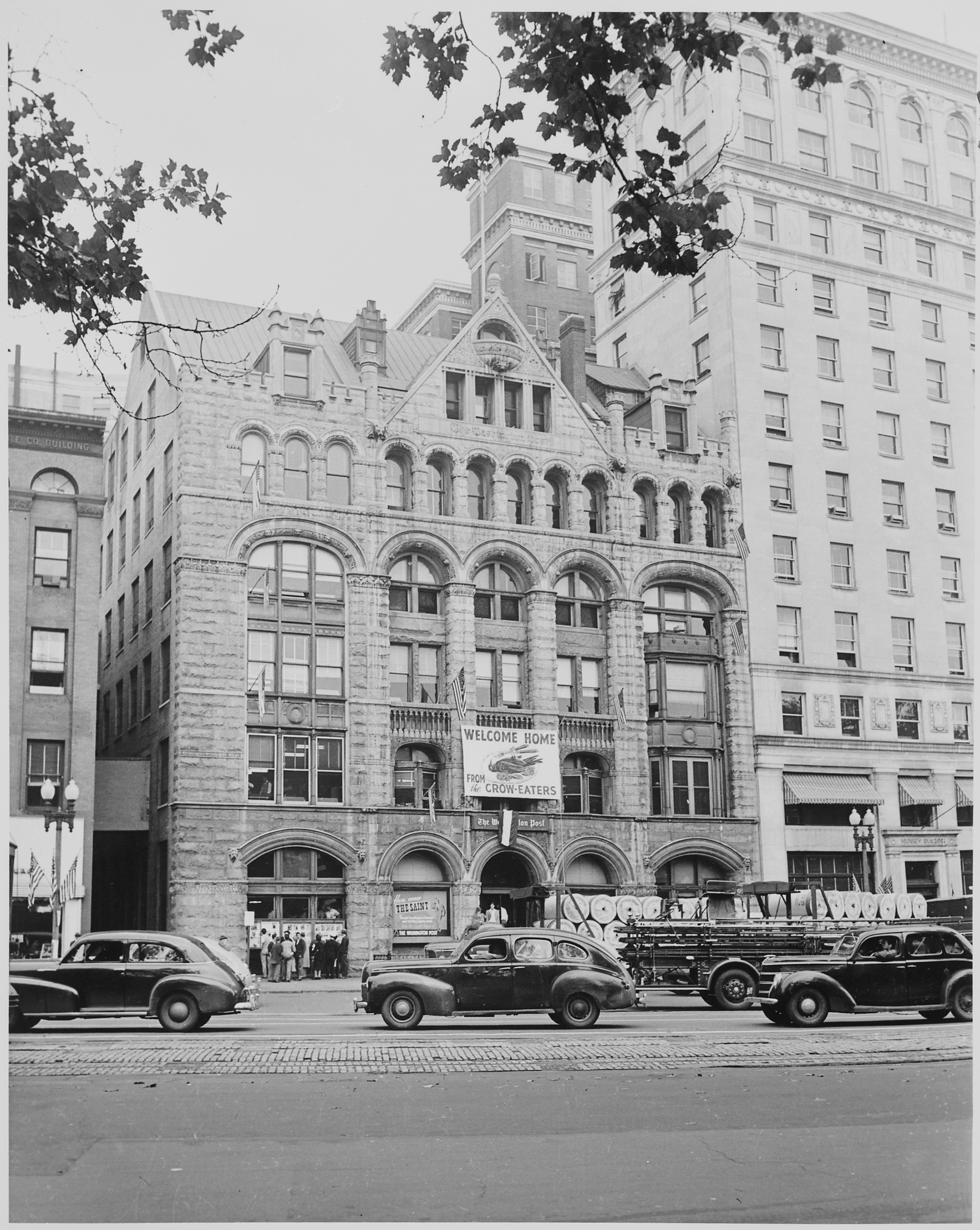
The Washington Post building the week after the 1948 United States presidential election; the "Crow-Eaters" sign is addressed to Harry Truman following his surprising re-election.

The newspaper was founded in 1877 by Stilson Hutchins (1838–1912); in 1880, it added a Sunday edition, becoming the city's first newspaper to publish seven days a week.

In April 1878, about four months into publication, The Washington Post purchased The Washington Union, a competing newspaper which was founded by John Lynch in late 1877. The Union had only been in operation about six months at the time of the acquisition. The combined newspaper was published from the Globe Building as The Washington Post and Union beginning on April 15, 1878, with a circulation of 13,000. The Post and Union name was used about two weeks until April 29, 1878, returning to the original masthead the following day.

In 1889, Hutchins sold the newspaper to Frank Hatton, a former Postmaster General, and Beriah Wilkins, a former Democratic congressman from Ohio. To promote the newspaper, the new owners requested the leader of the United States Marine Band, John Philip Sousa, to compose a march for the newspaper's essay contest awards ceremony. Sousa composed "The Washington Post". It became the standard music to accompany the two-step, a late 19th-century dance craze, and remains one of Sousa's best-known works. In 1893, the newspaper moved to a building at 14th and E streets NW, where it would stay until 1950. This building combined all functions of the newspaper into one headquarters – newsroom, advertising, typesetting, and printing – that ran 24 hours per day.

In 1898, during the Spanish–American War, the Post printed Clifford K. Berryman's classic illustration Remember the Maine, which became the battle-cry for American sailors during the War. In 1902, Berryman published another famous cartoon in the Post – Drawing the Line in Mississippi. This cartoon depicts President Theodore Roosevelt showing compassion for a small bear cub and inspired New York store owner Morris Michtom to create the teddy bear. Wilkins acquired Hatton's share of the newspaper in 1894 at Hatton's death.

=== 20th century ===
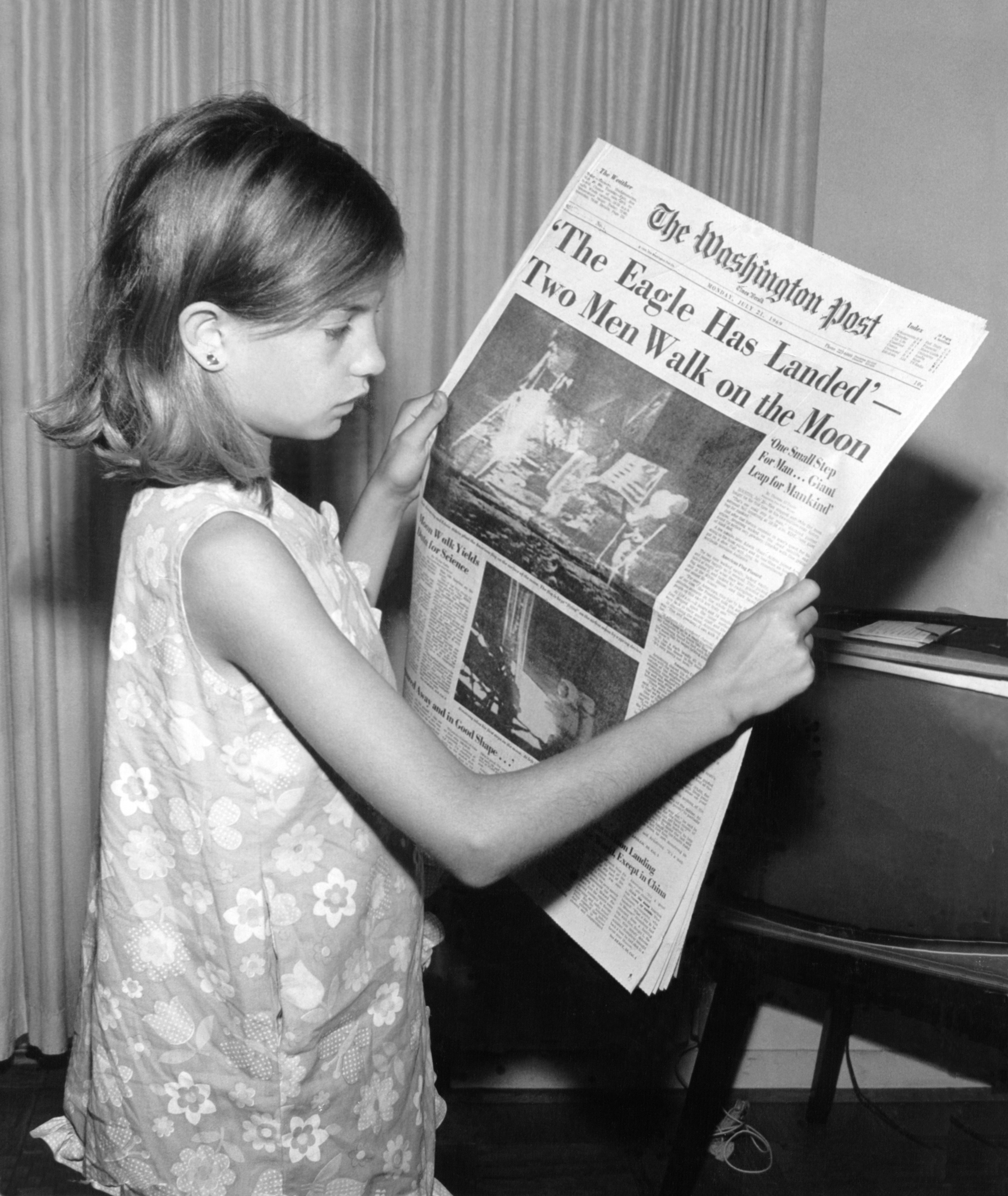
The July 21, 1969, edition with the headline "'The Eagle Has Landed': Two Men Walk on the Moon", covering the Apollo 11 landing

After Wilkins died in 1903, his sons John and Robert ran the Post for two years before selling it in 1905 to John Roll McLean, owner of the Cincinnati Enquirer. During the Wilson presidency, the Post was credited with the "most famous newspaper typo" in D.C. history according to Reason magazine; the Post intended to report that President Wilson had been "entertaining" his future-wife Mrs. Galt, but instead wrote that he had been "entering" Mrs. Galt.

When McLean died in 1916, he put the newspaper in a trust, having little faith that his playboy son Edward "Ned" McLean could manage it as part of his inheritance. Ned went to court and broke the trust, but, under his management, the newspaper slumped toward ruin. He bled the paper for his lavish lifestyle and used it to promote political agendas. During the Red Summer of 1919 the Post supported the white mobs and even ran a front-page story which advertised the location at which white servicemen were planning to meet to carry out attacks on black Washingtonians.

In 1929, financier Eugene Meyer, who had run the War Finance Corp. since World War I, secretly made an offer of $5 million for the Post, but he was rebuffed by Ned McLean. On June 1, 1933, Meyer bought the paper at a bankruptcy auction for $825,000 three weeks after stepping down as Chairman of the Federal Reserve. He had bid anonymously, and was prepared to go up to $2 million, far higher than the other bidders. These included William Randolph Hearst, who had long hoped to shut down the ailing Post to benefit his own Washington newspaper presence.

The Post's health and reputation were restored under Meyer's ownership. In 1946, Mayer designated Philip Graham, the husband of his daughter Katharine Graham as publisher. Meyer eventually gained the last laugh over Hearst, who had owned the old Washington Times and the Herald before their 1939 merger that formed the Times-Herald. This was, in turn, bought by and merged into the Post in 1954. The combined paper was officially named The Washington Post and Times-Herald until 1973, although the Times-Herald portion of the nameplate became less and less prominent over time.

The merger left the Post with two remaining local competitors, the Washington Star (Evening Star) and The Washington Daily News. In 1972, the two competitors merged, forming the Washington Star-News.

After Philip Graham died in 1963, control of The Washington Post Company passed to his wife Katharine, Eugene Meyer's daughter. Few women had run prominent national newspapers in the United States, and Katharine Graham said that she was particularly anxious about assuming this role. She served as publisher from 1969 to 1979. Graham took The Washington Post Company public on June 15, 1971, in the midst of the Pentagon Papers controversy. A total of 1,294,000 shares were offered to the public at $26 per share. By the end of Graham's tenure as CEO in 1991, the stock was worth $888 per share, not counting the effect of an intermediate 4:1 stock split.

Graham also oversaw the Post company's diversification purchase of the for-profit education and training company Kaplan, Inc. for $40 million in 1984. Twenty years later, Kaplan had surpassed the Post newspaper as the company's leading contributor to income, and by 2010 Kaplan accounted for more than 60% of the entire company revenue stream. Executive editor Ben Bradlee put the newspaper's reputation and resources behind reporters Bob Woodward and Carl Bernstein, who, in a long series of articles, chipped away at the story behind the 1972 burglary of Democratic National Committee offices in the Watergate complex in Washington. The Post's dogged coverage of the story, the outcome of which ultimately played a major role in the resignation of President Richard Nixon, won the newspaper a Pulitzer Prize in 1973.

In 1972, the "Book World" section was introduced with Pulitzer Prize-winning critic William McPherson as its first editor. It featured Pulitzer Prize-winning critics such as Jonathan Yardley and Michael Dirda, the latter of whom established his career as a critic at the Post. In 2009, after 37 years, with great reader outcries and protest, The Washington Post Book World as a standalone insert was discontinued, the last issue being Sunday, February 15, 2009, along with a general reorganization of the paper, such as placing the Sunday editorials on the back page of the main front section rather than the "Outlook" section and distributing some other locally oriented "op-ed" letters and commentaries in other sections. However, book reviews are still published in the Outlook section on Sundays and in the Style section the rest of the week, as well as online.

Donald E. Graham, Katharine's son, succeeded her as a publisher in 1979. In 1995, the domain name washingtonpost.com was purchased. That same year, a failed effort to create an online news repository called Digital Ink launched. The following year, it was shut down, and the first website was launched in June 1996.

=== Jeff Bezos era (since 2013) ===
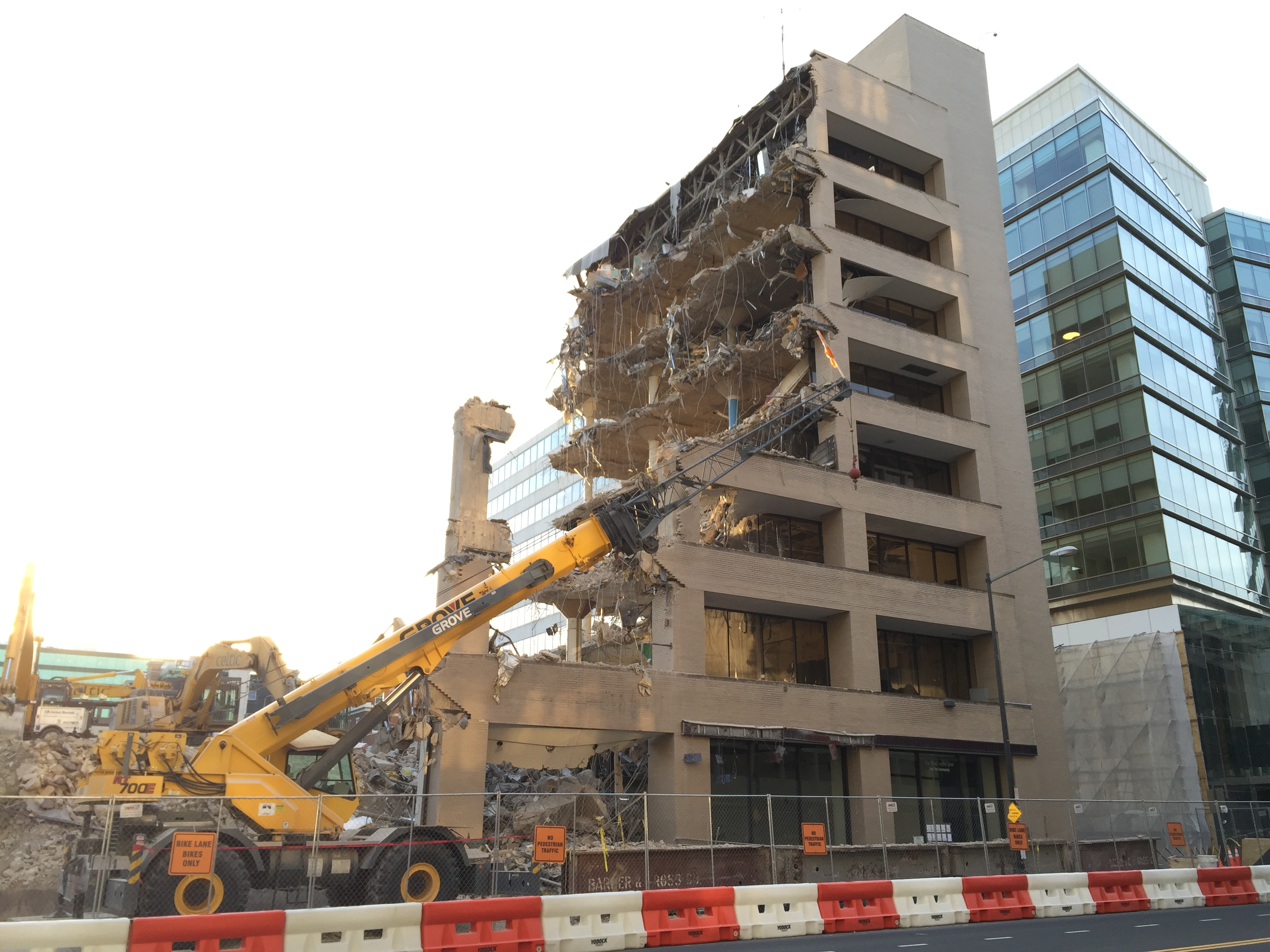
The demolition of The Washington Post's 15th Street headquarters in April 2016

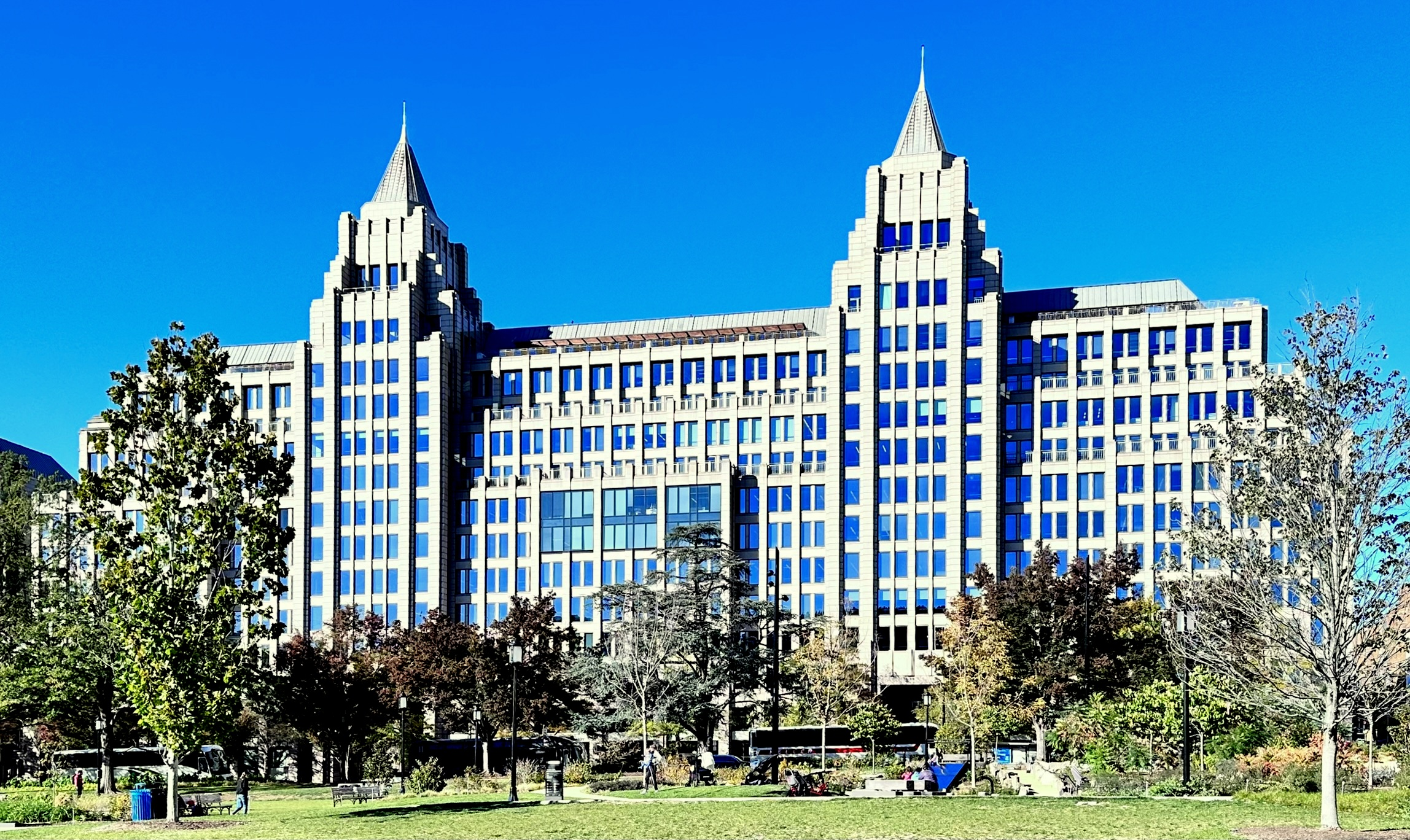
One Franklin Square, the home of the Post

In August 2013, Jeff Bezos purchased The Washington Post and other local publications, websites, and real estate for US$250 million, transferring ownership to Nash Holdings LLC, Bezos's private investment company. The paper's former parent company, which retained some other assets such as Kaplan and a group of TV stations, was renamed Graham Holdings shortly after the sale.

Nash Holdings, which includes the Post, is operated separately from technology company Amazon, which Bezos founded and where he is as of 2022 executive chairman and the largest single shareholder, with 12.7% of voting rights.

Bezos said he has a vision that recreates "the 'daily ritual' of reading the Post as a bundle, not merely a series of individual stories..." He has been described as a "hands-off owner", holding teleconference calls with executive editor Martin Baron every two weeks. Bezos appointed Fred Ryan (founder and CEO of Politico) to serve as publisher and chief executive officer. This signaled Bezos' intent to shift the Post to a more digital focus with a national and global readership.

In 2015, the Post moved from the building it owned at 1150 15th Street to a leased space three blocks away at One Franklin Square on K Street. Since 2014 the Post has launched an online personal finance section, a blog, and a podcast with a retro theme. The Post won the 2020 Webby People's Voice Award for News & Politics in the Social and Web categories.

In 2017, the newspaper hired Jamal Khashoggi as a columnist. In 2018, Khashoggi was murdered by Saudi agents in Istanbul.

In 2018, Monica Hesse was appointed the paper's first ever gender columnist. 17 days later, the Post published "Why can’t we hate men?", a #MeToo-inspired op-ed written by Suzanna Danuta Walters, the director of women's studies at Northeastern University. Some media outlets objected to it, including The Atlantic, the American Enterprise Institute, The National Review, Quillette, and The Washington Post itself. Six months after Hesse's appointment, the Post published Amber Heard's op-ed, "I spoke up against sexual violence — and faced our culture’s wrath. That has to change." This article ultimately led to a lawsuit filed in 2019 by Johnny Depp against Amber Heard for defamation. After a 7-week jury trial, Heard was found liable for defaming Depp, who received $15 million in damages.

In October 2023, the Post announced it would cut 240 jobs across the organization by offering voluntary separation packages to employees. In a staff-wide email announcing the job cuts, interim CEO Patty Stonesifer wrote, "Our prior projections for traffic, subscriptions and advertising growth for the past two years — and into 2024 — have been overly optimistic". The Post has lost around 500,000 subscribers since the end of 2020 and was set to lose $100 million in 2023, according to The New York Times. The layoffs prompted Dan Froomkin of Presswatchers to suggest that the decline in readership could be reversed by focusing on the rise of authoritarianism (in a fashion similar to the role the Post played during the Watergate scandal) instead of staying strictly neutral, which Froomkin says places the paper into an undistinguished secondary role in competition with other contemporary media. As part of the shift in tone, in 2023 the paper closed down the "KidsPost" column for children, the "Skywatch" astronomy column, and the "John Kelly's Washington" column about local history and sights, which had been running under different bylines since 1947. KidsPost subsequently returned in 2025.

In May 2024, CEO and publisher William Lewis announced that the organization would embrace artificial intelligence to improve the paper's financial situation, telling staff it would seek "AI everywhere in our newsroom."

In June 2024, Axios reported the Post faced significant internal turmoil and financial challenges. Lewis quickly generated controversy with his leadership style and proposed restructuring plans. The abrupt departure of executive editor Sally Buzbee and the appointment of two white men to top editorial positions sparked internal discontent, particularly given the lack of consideration for the Post's senior female editors. Additionally, Lewis' proposed division for social media and service journalism was met with resistance from staff. Reports alleging Lewis' attempts to influence editorial decisions, including pressuring Buzbee to drop a story about his past ties to a UK phone hacking scandal, and offering NPR's media correspondent an exclusive interview about the Post's future in exchange for not publishing similar allegations, further impacted the newsroom's morale. Staffers also became worried about Lewis' drinking and uninvolved role in the newsroom. Lewis continued to grapple with declining revenue and readership, and sought strategies to regain subscribers lost since the Trump era.

Later that month, the paper ran a story allegedly exposing a connection between incoming editor Robert Winnett and John Ford, a man who "admitted to an extensive career using deception and illegal means to obtain confidential information." Winnett withdrew from the position shortly thereafter. In January 2025, the Post announced it will lay off 4% of its staff, less than 100 people. Newsroom employees will not be affected.

Also in January 2025, the Post scrapped the paper's "gender columnist" role and reassigned Hesse from the Style/Power section to the Opinions section after Post editors rejected an article she recently submitted. This change was confirmed by Hesse herself in an article she wrote in March 2025.

In June 2025, the Post announced the upcoming launch of Ripple, a section of the Post's website that will allow columnists and non-professional writers from various newspapers and blogs to write opinion pieces. Non-professional writers will be allowed to use Ember, an AI tool created by the Post to help them write articles.

On January 14, 2026, as part of the court case United States v. Aurelio Luis Perez-Lugones, the FBI raided the apartment of a Post journalist, Hannah Natanson, and seized her phone, two laptops, and a smartwatch. Investigators said to Natanson that the focus of the probe was not her but Aurelio Perez-Lugones, a system administrator with top-secret security clearance, under investigation for taking home classified intelligence reports. The day after, the Post's editorial board called the search an "aggressive attack on the press freedom of all journalists".

On February 4, 2026, it was announced that around 300 Post employees would be laid off. The paper's sports and books coverage are expected to be closed entirely, and its local news coverage will be substantially cut. Additionally, their daily news "Post Reports" podcast, which ran for seven years, has been suspended. Several foreign bureaus were closed, and at least one correspondent in Ukraine was laid off. According to The New York Times, in the week following these job cuts, more than 60,000 readers canceled their digital subscriptions. The layoffs were driven by a reported $100 million of losses in 2024, subscriber drops following the paper's refusal to endorse a presidential candidate in the 2024 US election, and falling search traffic from AI tools.

On February 7, 2026, it was announced that Will Lewis, the paper's publisher, would step down and be replaced in the interim by Jeff D'Onofrio, who served as the company's chief financial officer. The Washington Post Guild employees union welcomed the change in leadership, stating that Lewis will be remembered for "the attempted destruction of a great American journalism institution", and urged Bezos to "sell the paper to someone willing to invest in its future".

==== Editorial changes and staff departures ====
In February 2025, Bezos announced that the opinion section of the Post would publish only pieces that support "personal liberties and free markets". David Shipley, The Post's opinion editor, resigned after failing to persuade Bezos to reconsider. Within two days of the announcement, it was reported that more than 75,000 digital subscribers had canceled their subscriptions. The following month, publisher Will Lewis killed a column by opinion columnist and editor Ruth Marcus criticizing the new direction. Marcus resigned, ending her 40-year tenure with the newspaper.

After the killing of Charlie Kirk in September 2025, the Post fired columnist and founding global opinion editor Karen Attiah, citing violations of its social media policy. Attiah said she was punished for "speaking out against political violence, racial double standards, and America's apathy toward guns", arguing the US "accepts and worships" gun violence. Politico noted that only one post mentioned Kirk; it referred to his statement that Black women "do not have the brain processing power" to be taken seriously. Attiah said her posts "made clear that not performing over-the-top grief for white men who espouse violence was not the same as endorsing violence against them", and described being pushed out after 11 years of service "for doing my job as a journalist" as a deeply "cruel 180". She was the last Black full-time writer at the opinion desk.

On July 31, 2026, opinion editor Adam O'Neal, who was hired the previous year, announced his resignation, effective August 31. He did not state a reason for his departure.

== Political positions ==
=== 20th century ===
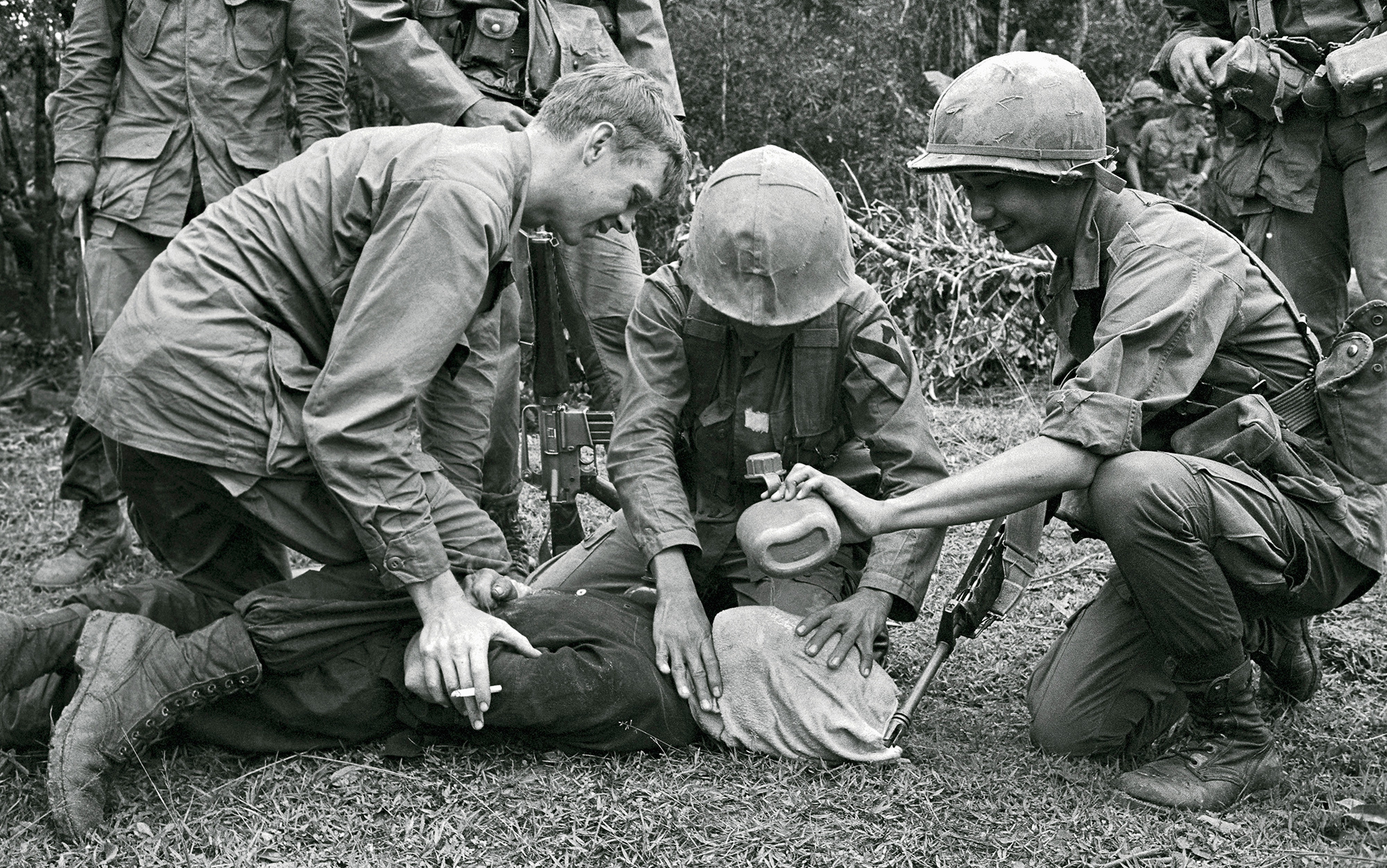
Two United States soldiers and a South Vietnamese soldier waterboard a captured North Vietnamese prisoner during the Vietnam War; the image, which appeared on the front cover of The Washington Post on January 21, 1968, led to the court-martial of a United States soldier, although The Washington Post described waterboarding as "fairly common".

In 1933, financier Eugene Meyer bought the bankrupt Post, and assured the public that neither he nor the newspaper would be beholden to any political party. But as a leading Republican who had been appointed Chairman of the Federal Reserve by Herbert Hoover in 1930, his opposition to Roosevelt's New Deal colored the paper's editorials and news coverage, including editorializing news stories written by Meyer under a pseudonym. His wife Agnes Ernst Meyer was a journalist from the other end of the spectrum politically. The Post ran many of her pieces including tributes to her personal friends John Dewey and Saul Alinsky.

In 1946, Meyer was appointed head of World Bank, and he named his son-in-law Phil Graham to succeed him as Post publisher. The post-war years saw the developing friendship of Phil and Kay Graham with the Kennedys, the Bradlees and the rest of the "Georgetown Set", including many Harvard University alumni that would color the Post's political orientation. Kay Graham's most memorable Georgetown soirée guest list included British diplomat and communist spy Donald Maclean.

The Post is credited with coining the term "McCarthyism" in a 1950 editorial cartoon by Herbert Block. Depicting buckets of tar, it made fun of Sen. Joseph McCarthy's "tarring" tactics, i.e., smear campaigns and character assassination against those targeted by his accusations. Sen. McCarthy was attempting to do for the Senate what the House Un-American Activities Committee had been doing for years—investigating Soviet espionage in America. The HUAC made Richard Nixon nationally known for his role in the Hiss/Chambers case that exposed communist spying in the State Department. The committee had evolved from the McCormack-Dickstein Committee of the 1930s.

Phil Graham's friendship with John F. Kennedy remained strong until they died in 1963. FBI Director J. Edgar Hoover reportedly told the new President Lyndon B. Johnson, "I don't have much influence with the Post because I frankly don't read it. I view it like the Daily Worker."

Ben Bradlee became the editor-in-chief in 1968, and Kay Graham officially became the publisher in 1969, paving the way for the aggressive reporting of the Pentagon Papers and Watergate scandals. The Post strengthened public opposition to the Vietnam War in 1971 when it published the Pentagon Papers. In the mid-1970s, some conservatives referred to the Post as "Pravda on the Potomac" because of its perceived left-wing bias in both reporting and editorials. Since then, the appellation has been used by both liberal and conservative critics of the newspaper.

=== 21st century ===
In the PBS documentary Buying the War, journalist Bill Moyers said in the year before the Iraq War there were 27 editorials supporting the Bush administration's desire to invade Iraq. National security correspondent Walter Pincus reported that he had been ordered to cease his reports that were critical of the administration. According to author and journalist Greg Mitchell: "By the Post's own admission, in the months before the war, it ran more than 140 stories on its front page promoting the war, while contrary information got lost".

On March 23, 2007, Chris Matthews said on his television program, "The Washington Post is not the liberal newspaper it was [...] I have been reading it for years and it is a neocon newspaper". It has regularly published a mixture of op-ed columnists, with some of them left-leaning (including E. J. Dionne, Dana Milbank, Greg Sargent, and Eugene Robinson), and some of them right-leaning (including George Will, Marc Thiessen, Michael Gerson and Charles Krauthammer).

Responding to criticism of the newspaper's coverage during the run-up to the 2008 presidential election, former Post ombudsman Deborah Howell wrote: "The opinion pages have strong conservative voices; the editorial board includes centrists and conservatives; and there were editorials critical of Obama. Yet opinion was still weighted toward Obama." According to a 2009 Oxford University Press book by Richard Davis on the impact of blogs on American politics, liberal bloggers link to The Washington Post and The New York Times more often than other major newspapers; however, conservative bloggers also link predominantly to liberal newspapers.

Since 2011, the Post has been running a column called "The Fact Checker" that the Post describes as a "truth squad". The Fact Checker received a $250,000 grant from Google News Initiative/YouTube to expand production of video fact checks.

In mid-September 2016, Matthew Ingram of Forbes joined Glenn Greenwald of The Intercept, and Trevor Timm of The Guardian in criticizing The Washington Post for "demanding that [former National Security Agency contractor Edward] Snowden ... stand trial on espionage charges".

After Donald Trump was elected in 2016, the Post adopted the slogan "Democracy Dies in Darkness" for its masthead. Communications Director of the Post Shani George said they choose this slogan because it "conveys who we are to the many millions of readers who have come to us for the first time over the last year". He also stated that the slogan was not added in response to Trump's actions.

In February 2025, Jeff Bezos announced that the paper's opinion pages would endorse "personal liberties and free markets" to the exclusion of other views. According to the NPR, the announcement suggested the Post was adopting a libertarian line. In October 2025, columnist Marc Thiessen stated that the paper's opinion section was now conservative.

In April 2026, Nathan J. Robinson wrote in The Nation that the Post has shifted from a centre-left economical stance to a hard-right one, opposing taxation of rich individuals, rent control, public transport, social housing and other social services. A significant number of articles in The Washington Post reportedly criticised labor unions and supported construction of new AI data centers.

==== Political endorsements ====
In the vast majority of U.S. elections, for federal, state, and local office, the Post editorial board has endorsed Democratic candidates. The paper's editorial board and endorsement decision-making are separate from newsroom operations. Until 1976, the Post did not regularly make endorsements in presidential elections. Since it endorsed Jimmy Carter in 1976, the Post has endorsed Democrats in presidential elections, and has never endorsed a Republican for president in the general election, although in the 1988 presidential election, the Post declined to endorse either Governor Michael Dukakis (the Democratic candidate) or Vice President George H. W. Bush (the Republican candidate). The Post editorial board endorsed Barack Obama in 2008 and 2012; Hillary Clinton in 2016; and Joe Biden in 2020. In 2024, the Post controversially announced that it would no longer publish presidential endorsements.

While the newspaper predominantly endorses Democrats in congressional, state, and local elections, it has occasionally endorsed Republican candidates. It endorsed Maryland Governor Robert Ehrlich's unsuccessful bid for a second term in 2006. In 2006, it repeated its historic endorsements of every Republican incumbent for Congress in Northern Virginia. The Post editorial board endorsed Virginia's Republican U.S. Senator John Warner in his Senate reelection campaign in 1990, 1996 and 2002; the paper's most recent endorsement of a Maryland Republican for U.S. Senate was in the 1980s, when the paper endorsed Senator Charlies "Mac" Mathias Jr. In U.S. House of Representatives elections, moderate Republicans in Virginia and Maryland, including Wayne Gilchrest, Thomas M. Davis, and Frank Wolf, have enjoyed the support of the Post; the Post also endorsed Republican Carol Schwartz in her campaign in Washington, D.C.

===== 2024 discontinuation of presidential endorsements =====
Eleven days before the 2024 presidential election, CEO and publisher William Lewis announced that the Post would not endorse a candidate for 2024. It was the first time since the 1988 presidential election that the paper did not endorse the Democratic candidate. Lewis also said that the paper would not make endorsements in any future presidential election. Lewis stated that the paper was "returning to our roots" of not endorsing candidates, and explained that the move was "a statement in support of our readers' ability to make up their own minds", and "consistent with the values the Post has always stood for and what we hope for in a leader: character and courage in service to the American ethic, veneration for the rule of law, and respect for human freedom in all its aspects." Sources familiar with the situation stated that the Post editorial board had drafted an endorsement for Kamala Harris, but that it had been blocked by order of the Post's owner Jeff Bezos.

The move was criticized by former executive editor Martin Baron, who considered it "disturbing spinelessness at an institution famed for courage", and suggested that Bezos was fearing retaliation from 2024 Republican candidate Donald Trump that could impact Bezos's other businesses if Trump were elected. Editor-at-large Robert Kagan and columnist Michele Norris resigned in the wake of the decision, and editor David Maraniss said that the paper was "dying in darkness", a reference to the paper's current slogan. Post opinion columnists jointly authored an article calling the decision to not endorse a "terrible mistake", and it was condemned by the Washington Post Guild, a union unit representing Post employees. More than 250,000 people (about ten percent of the Post's subscribers) canceled their subscriptions, and three members of the editorial board left the board, though they remain with the Post in other positions. An endorsement of Harris was subsequently published by the paper's humorist Alexandra Petri, who explained that "if I were the paper, I would be a little embarrassed that it has fallen to me, the humor columnist, to make our presidential endorsement", and that "I only know what's happening because our actual journalists are out there reporting, knowing that their editors have their backs, that there's no one too powerful to report on, that we would never pull a punch out of fear."

Condemning the Post's decision, several columnists, including Will Bunch, Jonathan Last, Dan Froomkin, Donna Ladd and Sewell Chan, described it as an example of what historian Timothy Snyder calls anticipatory obedience.

== Controversies ==
=== "Jimmy's World" fabrication ===
In September 1980, a Sunday feature story appeared on the front page of the Post titled "Jimmy's World" in which reporter Janet Cooke wrote a profile of the life of an eight-year-old heroin addict. Although some within the Post doubted the story's veracity, the paper's editors defended it, and assistant managing editor Bob Woodward submitted the story to the Pulitzer Prize Board at Columbia University for consideration. Cooke was awarded the Pulitzer Prize for Feature Writing on April 13, 1981. The story was subsequently found to be a complete fabrication, and the Pulitzer was returned.

=== Private "salon" solicitation ===
In July 2009, amid an intense debate over health care reform, Politico reported that a health-care lobbyist had received an "astonishing" offer of access to the Post's "health-care reporting and editorial staff". Post publisher Katharine Weymouth had planned a series of exclusive dinner parties or "salons" at her private residence, to which she had invited prominent lobbyists, trade group members, politicians, and business people. Participants were to be charged $25,000 to sponsor a single salon, and $250,000 for 11 sessions, which were closed to the public and to the non-Post press.

The idea drew swift criticism as an apparent ploy to allow insiders to purchase face time with Post staff. Weymouth quickly canceled the salons, saying, "This should never have happened." White House counsel Gregory B. Craig reminded officials that under federal ethics rules, they need advance approval for such events. Post Executive Editor Marcus Brauchli, who was named on the flier as one of the salon's "Hosts and Discussion Leaders", said he was "appalled" by the plan, adding, "It suggests that access to Washington Post journalists was available for purchase."

=== China Daily advertising supplements ===
Dating back to 2011, The Washington Post began to include "China Watch" advertising supplements provided by China Daily, an English language newspaper owned by the Publicity Department of the Chinese Communist Party, on the print and online editions. Although the header to the online "China Watch" section included the text "A Paid Supplement to The Washington Post", James Fallows of The Atlantic suggested that the notice was not clear enough for most readers to see. Distributed to the Post and multiple newspapers around the world, the "China Watch" advertising supplements range from four to eight pages and appear at least monthly. According to a 2018 report by The Guardian, "China Watch" uses "a didactic, old-school approach to propaganda."

In 2020, a report by Freedom House, titled "Beijing's Global Megaphone", criticized the Post and other newspapers for distributing "China Watch". In the same year, 35 Republican members of the U.S. Congress wrote a letter to the U.S. Department of Justice in February 2020 calling for an investigation of potential FARA violations by China Daily. The letter named an article that appeared in the Post, "Education Flaws Linked to Hong Kong Unrest", as an example of "articles [that] serve as cover for China's atrocities, including ... its support for the crackdown in Hong Kong." According to The Guardian, the Post had already stopped running "China Watch" in 2019.

In March 2020, China's Ministry of Foreign Affairs revoked the press credentials of American journalists working for the Post, The New York Times, and The Wall Street Journal, barring them from working as journalists in mainland China, Hong Kong, and Macau. Beijing described the expulsions as retaliation for U.S. restrictions on Chinese state media, which the Trump administration had designated as foreign missions the previous month.

=== Felicia Sonmez ===
In 2020, The Post suspended reporter Felicia Sonmez after she posted a series of tweets about the 2003 rape allegation against basketball star Kobe Bryant after Bryant's death. She was reinstated after over 200 Post journalists wrote an open letter criticizing the paper's decision. In July 2021, Sonmez sued The Post and several of its top editors, alleging workplace discrimination; the suit was dismissed in March 2022, with the court determining that Sonmez had failed to make plausible claims.

In June 2022, Sonmez engaged in a Twitter feud with fellow Post staffers David Weigel, criticizing him over what he later described as "an offensive joke", and Jose A. Del Real, who accused Sonmez of "engaging in repeated and targeted public harassment of a colleague". Following the feud, the newspaper suspended Weigel for a month for violating the company's social media guidelines, and the newspaper's executive editor Sally Buzbee sent out a newsroom-wide memorandum directing employees to "Be constructive and collegial" in their interactions with colleagues. The newspaper fired Sonmez, writing in an emailed termination letter that she had engaged in "misconduct that includes insubordination, maligning your co-workers online and violating The Post's standards on workplace collegiality and inclusivity." The Post faced criticism from the Post Guild after refusing to go to arbitration over the dismissal, stating that the expiration of the Post's contract "does not relieve the Post from its contractual obligation to arbitrate grievances filed prior to expiration."

=== Lawsuit by Covington Catholic High School student ===
In 2019, Covington Catholic High School student Nick Sandmann filed a defamation lawsuit against the Post, alleging that it libeled him in seven articles regarding the January 2019 Lincoln Memorial confrontation between Covington students and the Indigenous Peoples March. A federal judge dismissed the case, ruling that 30 of the 33 statements in the Post that Sandmann alleged were libelous were not, but allowed Sandmann to file an amended complaint as to three statements. After Sandmann's lawyers amended the complaint, the suit was reopened on October 28, 2019.

In 2020, The Post settled the lawsuit brought by Sandmann for an undisclosed amount.

=== Op-eds and columns ===
Several Washington Post op-eds and columns have prompted criticism, including a number of comments on race by columnist Richard Cohen over the years, and a controversial 2014 column on campus sexual assault by George Will.

The Post's decision to run an op-ed by Mohammed Ali al-Houthi, a leader in Yemen's Houthi movement, was criticized by some activists on the basis that it provided a platform to an "anti-Western and antisemitic group supported by Iran."

In 2022, actor Johnny Depp successfully sued ex-wife Amber Heard for an op-ed she wrote in The Washington Post where she described herself as a public figure representing domestic abuse two years after she had publicly accused him of domestic violence.

=== Criticism by elected officials ===
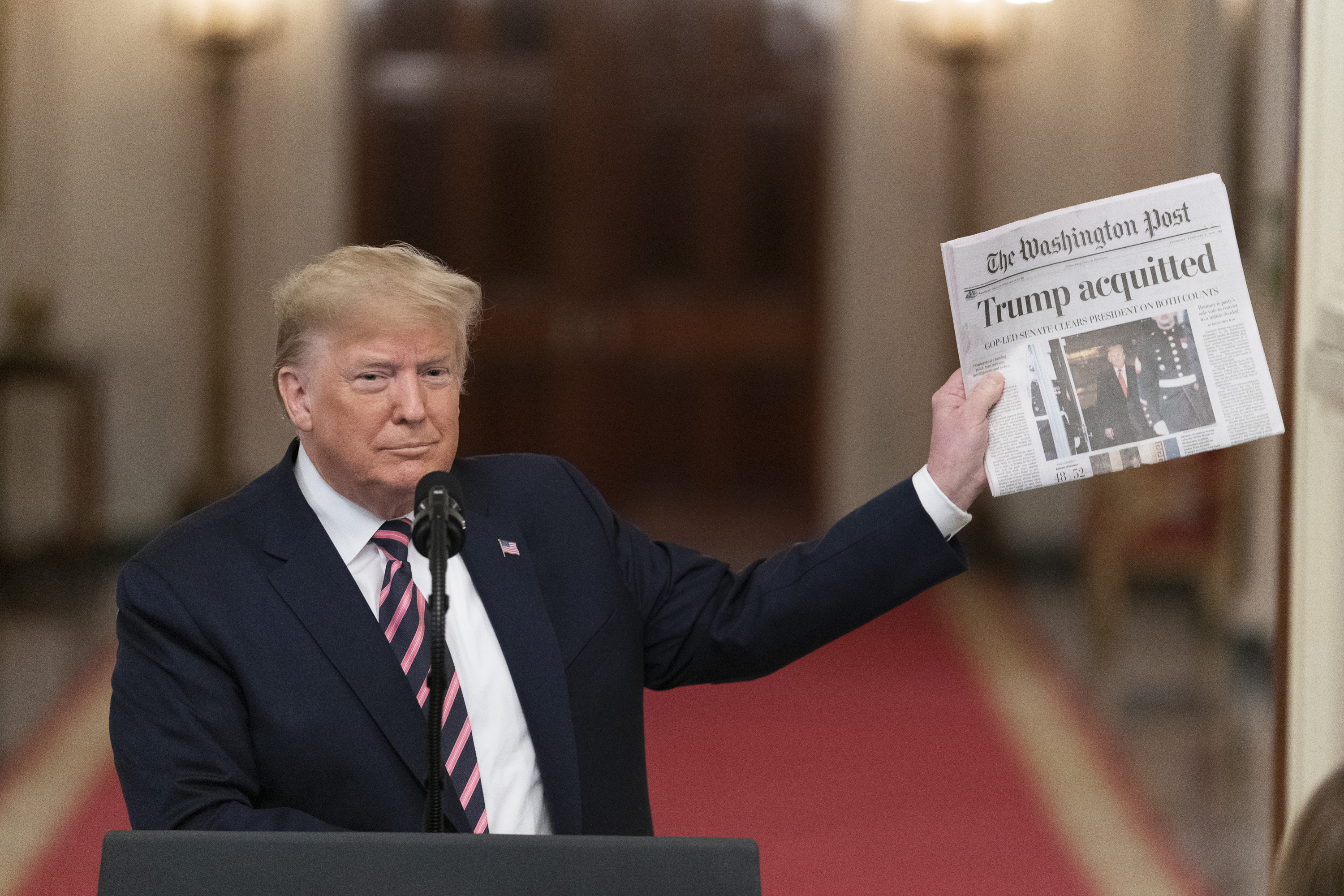
Donald Trump holds up a copy of The Washington Post during remarks on February 6, 2020, in the East Room of the White House.

Speaking on behalf of President Nixon, White House Press Secretary Ron Ziegler accused The Washington Post of "shabby journalism" for their focus on Watergate, only to apologize when the damning reporting on Nixon was proven correct.

45th/47th president Donald Trump repeatedly spoke out against The Washington Post on his Twitter account, having "tweeted or retweeted criticism of the paper, tying it to Amazon more than 20 times since his campaign for president" by August 2018. In addition to often attacking the paper itself, Trump used Twitter to blast various Post journalists and columnists.

During the 2020 Democratic Party presidential primaries, Senator Bernie Sanders repeatedly criticized The Washington Post, saying that its coverage of his campaign was slanted against him and attributing this to Jeff Bezos' purchase of the newspaper. Sanders' criticism was echoed by the socialist magazine Jacobin and the progressive journalist watchdog Fairness and Accuracy in Reporting. Washington Post executive editor Martin Baron responded by saying that Sanders' criticism was "baseless and conspiratorial".

=== Fossil fuel advertising ===
A 2023 investigation by The Intercept, The Nation, and DeSmog found that The Washington Post creates and publishes advertising ("advertorial") for the fossil fuel industry. Journalists who cover climate change for the Post said they were concerned that conflicts of interest with the companies and industries that caused climate change and obstructed action would reduce the credibility of their reporting on climate change and cause readers to downplay the climate crisis.

== Organization ==
=== Executive officers and editors ===
Major stockholders

1. Stilson Hutchins (1877–1889)
2. Frank Hatton and Beriah Wilkins (1889–1905)
3. John R. McLean (1905–1916)
4. Edward (Ned) McLean (1916–1933)
5. Eugene Meyer (1933–1948)
6. The Washington Post Company (1948–2013)
7. Nash Holdings (Jeff Bezos) (since 2013)

Publishers

1. Stilson Hutchins (1877–1889)
2. Beriah Wilkins (1889–1905)
3. John R. McLean (1905–1916)
4. Edward (Ned) McLean (1916–1933)
5. Eugene Meyer (1933–1946)
6. Philip L. Graham (1946–1961)
7. John W. Sweeterman (1961–1968)
8. Katharine Graham (1969–1979)
9. Donald E. Graham (1979–2000)
10. Boisfeuillet Jones Jr. (2000–2008)
11. Katharine Weymouth (2008–2014)
12. Frederick J. Ryan Jr. (2014–2023)
13. William Lewis (2024–2026)
14. Jeff D'Onofrio (since 2026)

Executive editors

1. James Russell Wiggins (1955–1968)
2. Ben Bradlee (1968–1991)
3. Leonard Downie Jr. (1991–2008)
4. Marcus Brauchli (2008–2012)
5. Martin Baron (2012–2021)
6. Sally Buzbee (2021–2024)
7. Matt Murray (since 2024)

=== Journalists ===
Current journalists at The Washington Post include: Yasmeen Abutaleb, Dan Balz, Will Englund, Marc Fisher, Robin Givhan, David Ignatius, Ellen Nakashima, Ashley Parker, Sally Quinn, Michelle Singletary, Ishaan Tharoor, and Joe Yonan.

Former journalists of The Washington Post include: Scott Armstrong, Melissa Bell, Ann Devroy, Edward T. Folliard, Malvina Lindsay, Mary McGrory, Christine Emba, Walter Pincus, and Bob Woodward.

=== Publishing service ===
Arc XP is a department of The Washington Post, which provides a publishing system and software for news and media organizations such as the Boston Globe, Le Parisien, The Irish Times, Libération, Dallas Morning News, The Globe and Mail, Record, Graham Media Group, and Sky News.

Mary Jordan was the founding editor, head of content, and moderator for Washington Post Live, the Post's editorial events business, which organizes political debates, conferences and news events for the media company. This includes "The 40th Anniversary of Watergate" in June 2012, that featured key Watergate figures including former White House counsel John Dean, Washington Post editor Ben Bradlee, and reporters Bob Woodward and Carl Bernstein, which was held at the Watergate hotel. Regular hosts include Frances Stead Sellers. Lois Romano was formerly the editor of Washington Post Live.

=== Unions ===
In 1975, the Washington Post pressmen's union went on strike. The Post hired replacement workers to replace the pressmen's union, and other unions returned to work in February 1976.

In 1986, during negotiations between the Post and the Newspaper Guild union over a new contract, five employees, including Newspaper Guild unit chairman Thomas R. Sherwood and assistant Maryland editor Claudia Levy, sued the Post for overtime pay, stating that the newspaper had claimed that budgets did not allow for overtime wages.

In June 2018, over 400 employees of The Washington Post signed an open letter to the owner Jeff Bezos demanding "fair wages; fair benefits for retirement, family leave and health care; and a fair amount of job security." The open letter was accompanied by video testimonials from employees, who alleged "shocking pay practices" despite record growth in subscriptions at the newspaper, with salaries rising an average of $10 per week, which the letter claimed was less than half the rate of inflation. The petition followed on a year of unsuccessful negotiations between The Washington Post Guild and upper management over pay and benefit increases.

As of 2023, the Washington Post Guild represented around 1,000 staff members at the Post. In December 2023, more than 750 journalists and staffers at the Post went on strike, accusing the company of refusing to "bargain in good faith" on issues including issues including pay increases, pay equity, remote work policies, and mental health resources. Later the same month, the Washington Post Guild won a new three-year contract with the paper, ending 18 months of negotiations.

In May 2025, a majority of technology workers at the Post voted to unionize as the Washington Post Tech Guild, representing more than 300 engineering, product design, and data workers at the Post.

== See also ==
- 1975–76 Washington Post pressmen's strike
- All the President's Men, a 1974 book by Carl Bernstein and Bob Woodward about the Watergate scandal
- All the President's Men, a 1976 film based on Bernstein's and Woodward's book
- List of prizes won by The Washington Post
- The Post, a 2017 film based on the publication of the Pentagon Papers
- The Washington Star (1852–1981)
- The Lily, publication of the Post
- Washington Post Radio, a former radio news service
