= William Lewis (journalist) =

British media executive (born 1969)

Sir William Lewis
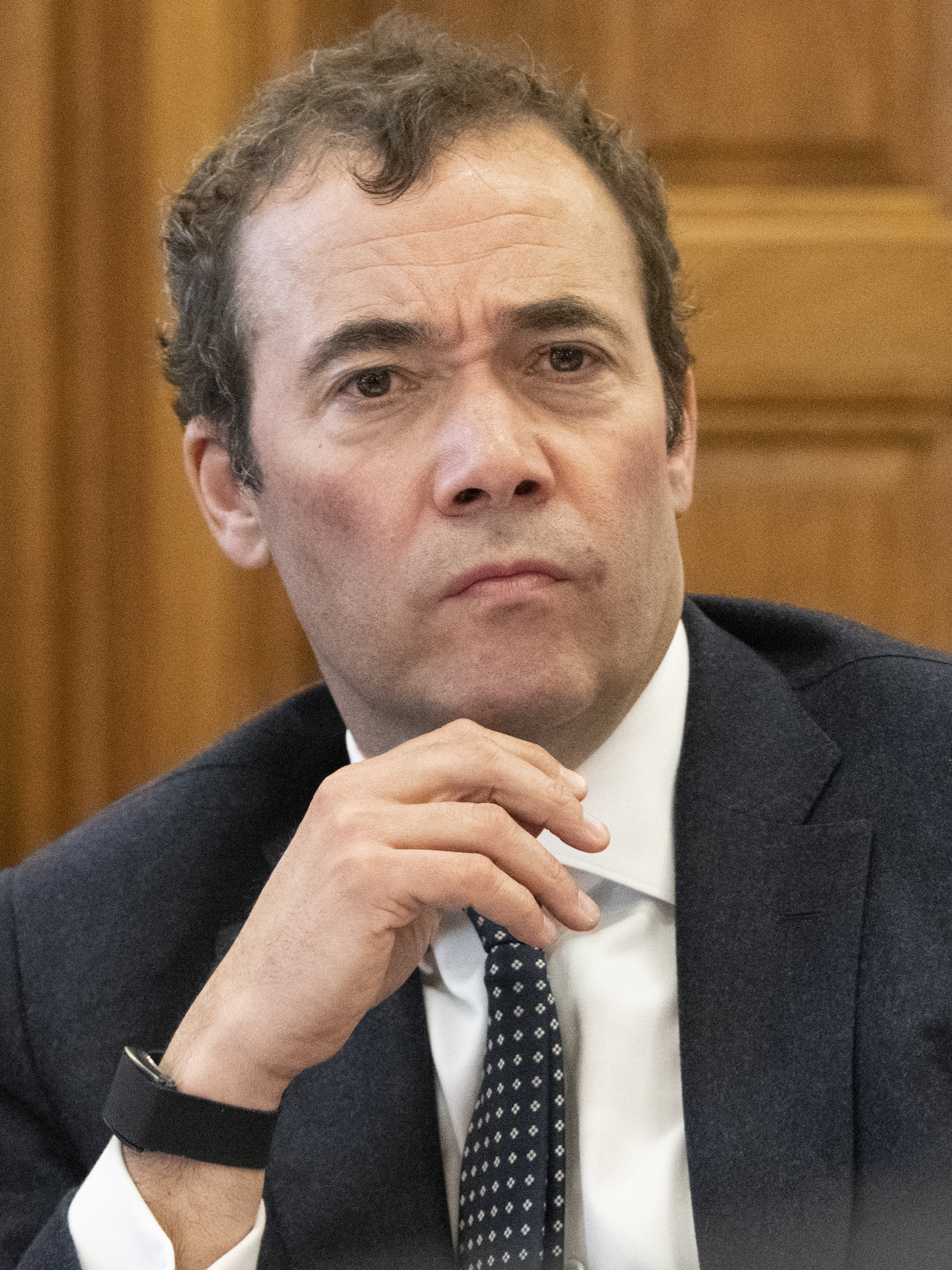
- William Lewis in 2019
- Born: William John Lewis; 2 April 1969 (age 57); London, England, UK
- Education: University of Bristol (BSc); City University London (PgDip)
- Relatives: Simon Lewis (brother)

Sir William John Lewis (born 2 April 1969) is a British media executive who served as the publisher and chief executive officer of The Washington Post from 2024 to 2026. He was formerly chief executive of Dow Jones & Company and publisher of The Wall Street Journal. Earlier in his career, he was known as a journalist and then editor.

While editor of The Daily Telegraph, Lewis led the team that broke the story of the MPs' expenses scandal, which led to the resignations of six government ministers and Speaker of the House of Commons Michael Martin, and to the creation of the Independent Parliamentary Standards Authority.

From September 2010 to July 2011, Lewis worked as general manager of the newspaper publisher News International, playing a role in the company's response to the phone hacking crisis. In July 2011, following the closure of the News of the World, Lewis left News International to join the Management and Standards Committee, an independent division led by Lord Grabiner KC, created by the News Corp board to orchestrate cooperation with multiple law enforcement investigations into News International.

On 5 November 2023, Lewis was named as the new publisher and CEO of The Washington Post. During his tenure, he clashed with executive editor Sally Buzbee over his attempt to reorganize the newsroom structure and to prevent coverage of his role in the phone hacking crisis.

== Early life and career ==
William Lewis was born and raised in Hampstead Garden Suburb, North London, England. His father David Lewis M.B.E, worked as a Managing Director of a packaging company and his mother Sally was a teacher. Lewis's primary education was at Brookland Junior school in Hampstead Garden Suburb. His secondary education was at Whitefield school, a comprehensive school in the London Borough of Barnet. After achieving his A levels, Lewis studied for a BSc in politics and economics at Bristol University, where he wrote for the student newspaper, Epigram, and captained the University 1st football team. Following university, Lewis completed a postgraduate diploma in Periodical Journalism at City University.

In 1991, Lewis was hired as a finance reporter by The Mail on Sunday. In 1994, he left the tabloid to take a job in the Financial Times' investigative unit. He later became fund management correspondent and then mergers and acquisitions correspondent. In 1999, while posted at the New York office he broke the story of the ExxonMobil merger, the biggest industrial merger in US corporate history. The scoop surprised the US business media and helped establish the Financial Times in the US. Following this Lewis was promoted to Global News Editor. He was then poached to become business editor at the Sunday Times, where he remained for three years, from 2002 to 2005.

== Telegraph Media Group ==
Lewis joined the Telegraph Media Group (TMG) as city editor in August 2005 and was made deputy editor of The Telegraph while he was still working out his notice from The Sunday Times. In October 2006 he became The Daily Telegraph's youngest ever editor. On joining The Telegraph, Lewis described the newspaper as a "shambles", with "no innovation, no culture of improvement, no understanding of the need to perform, of needing to work with your colleagues rather than be at war with them."

As an editor, he took control of the newspaper during a period of tumultuous change due to the decline in print sales and display advertising revenue. Lewis designed the layout of the Telegraph's new Victoria newsroom and saw through the modernisation program which involved senior staff cuts. The move was initially felt to be in conflict with the newspaper's brand and ageing readership.

In 2007 he was made editor-in-chief of TMG.

During his time as editor, he also attempted a broader debate at The Telegraph about the environment. While the newspapers and website continued to house global warming deniers such as Christopher Booker and James Delingpole, he also recruited Geoffrey Lean, the environmental commentator to write a weekly column and lead the Telegraph's global warming coverage.

== Role in the parliamentary expenses scandal ==
Lewis's involvement in the scandal began when he was told by colleagues that they had been approached by an intermediary on behalf of a source who said that they had four years' worth of MPs' data copied onto a disk. After establishing that the paper would not be breaking the law by accepting the disc, and that the story was in the public interest, Lewis approved negotiation with the intermediary.

The intermediary, a former SAS officer John Wick, had already offered the story to a number of other newspapers, all of whom had been reluctant to take the risk of publishing, or meet the price set by Wick. Once Lewis's team concluded negotiations with the source, the Telegraph team had only ten days to investigate the data on the disk which meant wading through more than a million documents.

Lewis stressed to his colleagues that he wanted the Telegraph to be seen as fair and balanced in their approach.

The next stage involved the team writing to each MP to put them on notice that a story was being written, and then to wait for the replies. The first MP to revert to the Telegraph team was Secretary of State for Justice Jack Straw. Straw replied, confirming the information in the letter and explaining his expenses. Lewis told the Leveson enquiry: "Only then did I feel able to give the green light to publication that evening."

The publication of the story led to the resignation of the Speaker of the House of Commons, Michael Martin, a further six government ministers and the creation of the Independent Parliamentary Standards Authority. A police investigation into the leak was called off in May 2009. A statement issued by Scotland Yard said that although the unauthorised disclosure of information appeared to "breach public duty", much of the information was in the process of being prepared for release under the Freedom of Information Act.

== Departure from the Telegraph Group ==
In the summer of 2009, Lewis took a two-month sabbatical from TMG to attend the Advanced Management Program at Harvard Business School – a compressed version of the college's famed Masters in Business Administration. Towards the end of this period Lewis was joined by TMG chief executive Murdoch MacLennan who stayed to hammer out Lewis's future at TMG.

In November 2009, Lewis returned to the UK, and founded Euston Partners, a digital development division based in Euston, London, staffed by a team of Telegraph employees. The aim of the division was to find a way for newspapers to make money from the emerging App economy. In January 2010 Lewis took the title of Managing Director Digital, while retaining his position of group editor in chief. Shortly after this he gave up the daily running of Sunday and Daily Telegraph. He was succeeded in the editor's chair by Tony Gallagher in late 2009, but remained editor-in-chief.

At the 2010 British Press Awards, The Telegraph was named the "National Newspaper of the Year" for its coverage of the MPs' expenses scandal (named "Scoop of the Year"), with Lewis winning "Journalist of the Year" for his role.

Accepting his award Lewis said: "If there was ever a story that proved that news still sells newspapers I suspect this was it."

Despite this success, all was not well within TMG. Lewis wanted to create a standalone business with a "start-up mentality" from the digital unit, whereas MacLennan wanted the Euston-based project to remain within his control at TMG. Unable to come to an agreement with MacLennan, Lewis departed on 5 May 2010. The split was described in the press as "amicable" but that Maclennan had been "impatient to see results". TMG said they would continue to maintain the digital division.

== News International ==
In September 2010 Lewis was hired by News International as group general manager. A key part of this new role was to modernise the company and create streamlined digital newsrooms as he had done at TMG.

Almost immediately after Lewis joined the group, an article in The New York Times drew attention to the ongoing issue of illegal phone message interception by the News of the World. Towards the end of 2010, Lewis was informed that the company was facing a large number of civil actions relating to phone hacking. On 10 January, Lewis sent out a formal instruction to the IT staff at News International that all evidence relevant to various civil and criminal actions was to be retained on News International's email servers.

Lewis remained as general manager as the crisis grew. In the aftermath of revelations by The Guardian that News of the World reporters had deleted voicemails of the murdered school girl, Milly Dowler, the News of the World was closed on 7 July 2011. Lewis stepped down as group general manager to take a role as an executive member of the Management and Standards Committee, an independent division of News Corp mandated by the board to cooperate fully with all authorities investigating wrongdoing at News International.

In July 2024, former British Prime Minister Gordon Brown announced Scotland Yard were looking into claims Lewis was involved in a 2011 mass cover-up of phone hacking by British tabloids.

== Management and Standards Committee ==
The formal establishment of the Management and Standards Committee was confirmed on 18 July 2011. The MSC was chaired by Lord Grabiner QC, a senior commercial lawyer, taking legal advice from the law firm Linklaters. The MSC reported directly to News Corp board members Joel Klein and Viet Dinh. Both Dinh and Klein were former US Assistant Attorney Generals. Lewis, was named in the press release as a "full time executive member." He was joined in the role by Simon Greenberg.

The Terms of Reference were published on 21 July 2011. "The MSC was authorised to cooperate fully with all relevant investigations and inquiries in the News of the World phone hacking case, police payments and all other related issues across News International, as well as conducting its own enquiries where appropriate."

The MSC included 100 legal staff from Linklaters, as well as forensic advisers from PricewaterhouseCoopers. Their role was to review all law enforcement requests for evidence and comply if those requests were relevant to the various ongoing investigations.

Metropolitan Police Service investigations Operation Weeting (phone hacking) and Operation Elveden (corruption of public officials) resulted in a string of arrests of News International journalists from October 2011 to Mid 2012, prompting complaints from Sun staff that the paper was subject to a "witch hunt." Though no Sun journalists were successfully convicted by Operation Elveden, News of the World feature writer Dan Evans received a 10-month suspended sentence. Operation Weeting successfully convicted News of the World journalists Neville Thurlbeck and Greg Miskiw who were both sentenced to six months in prison. Former News of the World editor Andy Coulson received an 18-month sentence.

As of 20 July 2012, Lewis began the process of departing the MSC.

=== Vince Cable leak allegation ===
In December 2010, Daily Telegraph reporters secretly recorded the UK Business Secretary Vince Cable making a number of unguarded remarks about the UK government and his view that "we have declared war on Murdoch". The Telegraph reported the remarks about government, but did not publish his views on Murdoch. These views were controversial, because Cable was overseeing in a sub-judicial role the bid by Murdoch's News Corporation for all of BSkyB. The remarks about Murdoch were leaked to the BBC's Business Editor, Robert Peston, who wrote an article on it. The Telegraph stated that it had been preparing to publish a follow-up story on Murdoch's remarks before it leaked.

Telegraph management hired the detective agency Kroll to find the source of the leak.

In July 2011, Reuters reported that the corporate investigations firm Kroll had "strong reason" to suspect that Lewis had been involved in the leak to Peston. The leaks took place three months after Lewis left The Telegraph. They were seen to be of commercial benefit to News Corporation, the parent company of News International, in relation to the News Corporation takeover bid for BSkyB. The New York Times noted the existing relationship between Lewis and Peston, who had worked closely together at the Financial Times.

Reuters also reported that Kroll had identified that TMG's information security systems were porous and too many people had access to the relevant systems for the leaker to be pinpointed. Kroll advised The Telegraph that because of the number of people who had access to databanks (which included employees for telecoms giant BT), a continued investigation would be unlikely to produce a conclusive result. Kroll did not interview Lewis in the course of the investigation. Kroll found that around 15 people at The Telegraph had access to the Cable audio file. Kroll concluded that there was circumstantial evidence that Lewis was behind the leak, but no direct proof.

== Dow Jones and The Wall Street Journal ==
Lewis was appointed interim CEO of Dow Jones and Company on 21 January 2014. On 9 May 2014, Lewis was confirmed as CEO of Dow Jones and Company and publisher of The Wall Street Journal, following the departure of previous CEO Lex Fenwick in 2014. Lewis had responsibility for publishing The Wall Street Journal, Factiva (a business information and research tool), Barron's, and the Dow Jones Financial News.

In 2016, Dow Jones retained an outside consultancy, Willis Towers Watson, as part of a review into its hiring and compensation practices. Lewis vowed to address all pay disparities within the company.

Lewis focused on modernising the Wall Street Journal newsroom and developing its technology and data businesses. In 2017, the company announced a partnership with the UK's National Theatre to support international engagement for the Theatre company. In an interview with The New York Times he commented on his leadership approach: "I think that the chief executive or leader should often be the agitator in chief as well... You constantly think about the next iteration of the model and structure."

The staff of The Wall Street Journal won a Pulitzer Prize in 2019 for uncovering President Trump's relationship with Michael Cohen and payoffs to the adult movie actress, Stormy Daniels.

Lewis left his positions at Dow Jones and The Wall Street Journal in 2020.

=== Criticism of Google and Facebook ===
Lewis has regularly made the case for professional media and has criticised technology companies for contributing to the rise of fake news. In a panel at the Cannes Lions in 2015, Lewis said:

"...the issue for us, and I think the broader industry, is do we run headless chicken-like towards offers from companies like Apple and Facebook to put our content in their walled gardens?. Or do we pause and think together about what the most appropriate way of dealing with these opportunities are and make sure that we don't repeat the mistakes of the past? Professionally created news is of incredible importance in society and has deep moral purpose".

In an interview with the Evening Standard in 2017 he commented: "Everyone can now see very clearly the grave problem with fake news. Google has played an incredibly destructive role. And when professional media disappears, bad things follow".

Lewis has since led negotiations with Apple and Facebook. In a newsroom meeting about the WSJ deal with Apple News+ Lewis said that the deal "will enable us to get our journalism in front of millions of people who may never have paid for our journalism before."

In October 2019, News Corp signed a deal with Facebook who agreed to pay a licensing fee to carry WSJ news on its platform.

=== China tensions ===
In February 2020 China threatened that it would expel three Wall Street Journal staff following an opinion piece published on 3 February titled "The Real Sick Man of Asia". The piece was critical of the Chinese government's secretive and slow response to the Coronavirus crisis.

China's announcement that it would expel the three journalists followed one day after the Trump administration redesignated five major Chinese news organizations as government not journalistic entities.

On 19 February, Lewis responded, stating that while he regretted the upset caused, "The need for quality, trusted news reporting from China is greater than ever; today's decision to target our News department journalists greatly hinders that effort."

Following the expulsion threat, four dozen Wall Street Journal journalists based in China, under pressure from the Chinese authorities, wrote a letter to Lewis asking him to correct the headline and apologize to the Journal's readers as well as others who might be offended by it.

Geng Shuang, a spokesman for China's Ministry of Foreign Affairs, passed on a Chinese Government demand that the Wall Street Journal "recognize the seriousness of the error, openly and formally apologize, and investigate and punish those responsible, while retaining the need to take further measures against the newspaper."

Lewis did not apologize.

=== Resignation from Dow Jones ===
Lewis resigned as CEO on 8 April 2020. In an official company statement News Corp Chief Executive Robert Thomson said, "Will Lewis has overseen a remarkable period of growth and digital transformation at Dow Jones, making it the finest news and professional information business in the world." Lewis was quoted in the press coverage as saying that his departure from the company was amicable and that he was looking forward to spending more time with his family in London. He was replaced by Almar Latour.

In May 2020 he appeared in a shortlist alongside three other candidates to become Director-General of the BBC in succession to Tony Hall, Baron Hall of Birkenhead.

== The News Movement ==
In May 2021, it was reported that Lewis joined former BBC newsman Kamal Ahmed in founding The News Movement, a digital news company aiming to counter misinformation. Ahmed will serve as its editor-in-chief.

During this time Lewis was vice-chair of the Associated Press news agency.

In 2025 The Guardian reported that Lewis had acted as an adviser to British Prime Minister Boris Johnson for six months in 2022, which Johnson did not disclose in official transparency records. During this period Johnson was dealing with a series of scandals. On the eve of Johnson's resignation announcement, Lewis spent a day working closely with Johnson and other advisers.

== The Washington Post ==
On 5 November 2023 Lewis was named chief executive officer and publisher of The Washington Post, replacing Fred Ryan. Lewis began the job on 2 January 2024.

In April 2024, Lewis announced a plan to reorganize the newsroom, splitting off a new division focused on reporting for social media and service journalism. He offered executive editor Sally Buzbee a role leading the new division, which she viewed as a demotion and helped prompt her resignation in June 2024. Lewis also clashed with Buzbee over the Post's publication of an article that reported on a judge's decision to let him be named as potentially involved in the News International phone hacking scandal, in which Lewis deleted implicating emails before a police search. NPR reporter David Folkenflik reported Lewis had previously tried to offer him an exclusive interview in exchange for suppressing the story.

Lewis resigned as publisher and CEO of the Post in February 2026, days after the company announced cutting nearly one-third of its staff. He was immediately succeeded by Jeff D'Onofrio, the Post's chief financial officer since June 2025.

== Honours ==
- Honorary Degree of Doctor of Laws from Bristol University July 2010
- Honorary Degree of Doctor of Letters from the University of Lincoln September 2010
- Honorary Degree of Doctor of Science from Cass Business School, 2019
- Appointment as Knight Bachelor on 9 June 2023 as part of the 2022 Prime Minister's Resignation Honours

Media offices
Preceded by John Bryant	Editor of The Daily Telegraph; 2006–2009	Succeeded by Tony Gallagher
Preceded by Fred Ryan	Publisher of The Washington Post; 2 January 2024 – present	Succeeded by Incumbent
Preceded by Patty Stonesifer (interim)	CEO of "The Washington Post"; 2 January 2024 – present	Succeeded by Incumbent
