= Jeff D'Onofrio =

American businessman

- Born: Jeffrey D'Onofrio
- Education: Penn State University (BS); Cornell University (MBA)

Jeffrey D'Onofrio is an American businessman who has served as the acting chief executive of The Washington Post since February 2026.

== Early life and education ==
Jeffrey D'Onofrio graduated from the Cornell Johnson Graduate School of Management in 2011.

== Career ==
=== Early positions ===
D'Onofrio served as the chief financial officer of the Skip Barber Racing School and MLB Advanced Media. While pursuing his Master of Business Administration in 2010, he became the chief financial officer of Zagat. D'Onofrio helped negotiate Zagat's sale to Google in 2011. Following the acquisition, he remained with Zagat to lead its finance and operations departments.

=== Tumblr (2014–2022) ===
D'Onofrio joined the social media service Tumblr as its chief financial officer in December 2013 and became its president and chief operating officer in October 2014. He became the site's chief executive officer after David Karp's resignation. As chief executive of Tumblr, D'Onofrio permanently banned adult content from the site using automated systems and introduced an internet literacy campaign ahead of the 2020 United States presidential election. D'Onofrio sought individual advertising campaigns, in comparison to mass targeted advertising present on other social media services. He resigned in February 2022. Concurrently, D'Onofrio briefly served as the general manager of Yahoo News while it was a subsidiary of Verizon Media.

=== CafeMedia and Raptive (2022–2025) ===
After serving as Tumblr's chief executive, D'Onofrio became the chief financial officer of CafeMedia, an advertising management company. CafeMedia later became Raptive.

=== The Washington Post (2025–present) ===
In June 2025, D'Onofrio was named as the chief financial officer of The Washington Post. In February 2026, he became the acting president and chief executive of The Washington Post following William Lewis's resignation. In a memorandum, D'Onofrio wrote that the Post was "ending a hard week of change with more change", in reference to layoffs Lewis instituted.
