= Fred Ryan =

American newspaper executive and political consultant (born 1955)

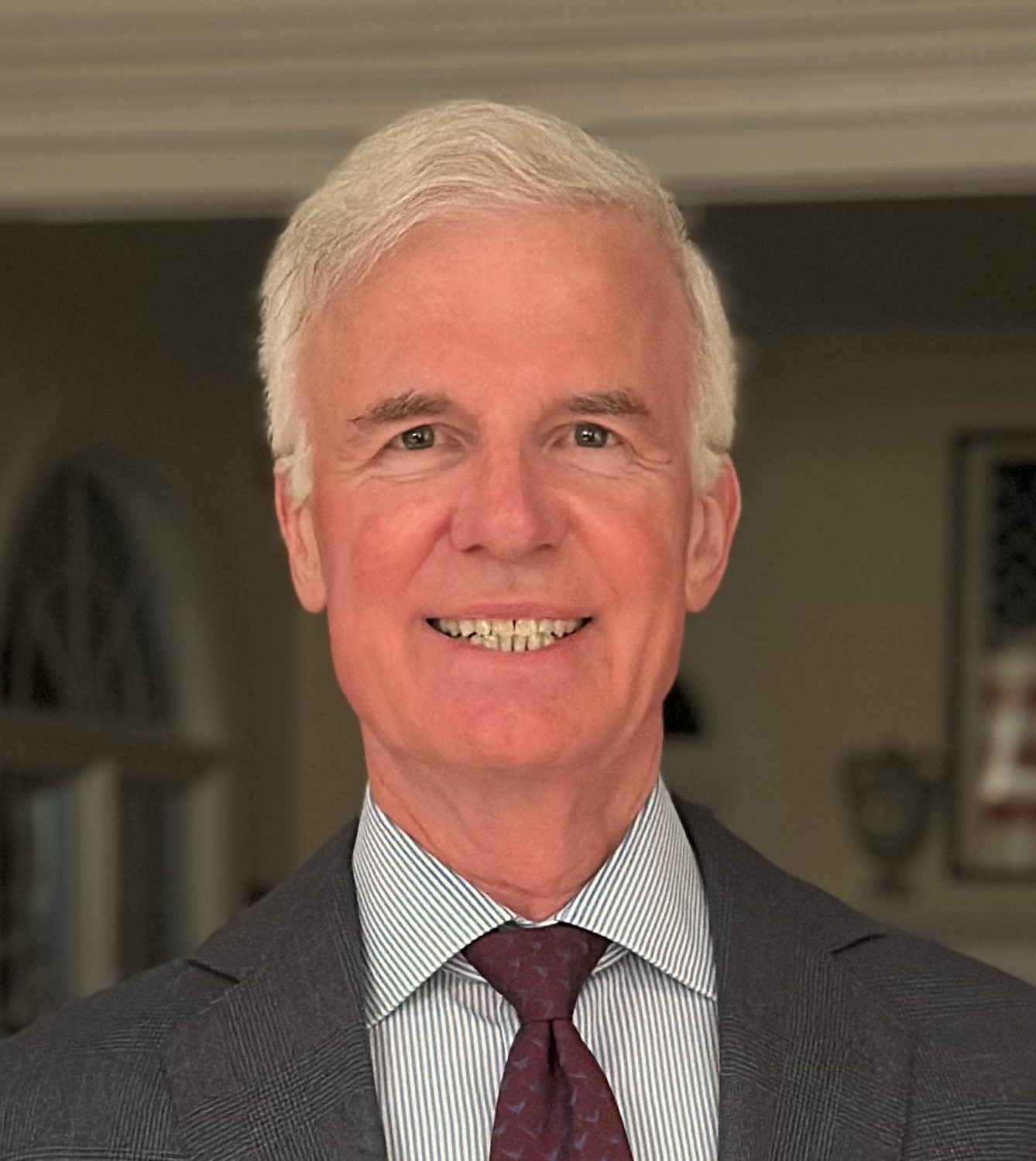

Chairman of the Ronald Reagan Presidential Foundation and Institute
- Incumbent
- Assumed office 1995
- Preceded by: Lodwrick Cook

Personal details
- Born: Frederick Joseph Ryan Jr. April 12, 1955 (age 71) Tampa, Florida, U.S.
- Party: Republican
- Spouse: Genevieve Ryan
- Education: University of Southern California (BA, JD)
- Known for: Founding CEO of Politico; President of Allbritton Communications; Publisher and CEO of The Washington Post

Frederick Joseph Ryan Jr. (born April 12, 1955) is an American media entrepreneur, author, and lawyer who served as the publisher and chief executive officer of The Washington Post from 2014 to 2023. He was the president and chief operating officer of Allbritton Communications Company and the founding chief executive officer and president of Politico. He served as the chief of staff for former President Ronald Reagan from 1989 to 1995 and is the chairman of the board of trustees of the Ronald Reagan Presidential Foundation and Institute and Director of the Center on Civility and Democracy.

== Early life ==
Ryan was born on April 12, 1955, in Tampa, Florida. His parents, Fred and Beth Ryan, were both military veterans. He grew up on military bases in the US and abroad.

== Education ==
In 1977, Ryan graduated magna cum laude with a bachelor's degree from the University of Southern California. In 1980, Ryan graduated with honors from the USC Law School.

Ryan received an honorary doctorate and delivered the commencement address at the Wake Forest University graduation ceremony in 2019.

== Early career ==
Ryan worked as an attorney at the Los Angeles, California law firm of Hill, Farrer, and Burrill before joining 1980 Reagan-Bush presidential campaign.

== White House years ==
Ryan began serving at the White House in February 1982 during the Reagan administration as Deputy Director of Presidential Appointments and Scheduling. He was appointed a year later to the position of Director of Presidential Appointments and Scheduling. In 1985, Ryan was appointed by the President to head the White House Office of Private Sector Initiatives, as well as maintaining his position as Director of Presidential Appointments and Scheduling.

From 1982-1989, Ryan served as the Assistant to the President under Reagan.

When President Reagan left office in 1989, Ryan was selected to be his Chief of Staff. In this role, Ryan was responsible for the establishment and operation of Reagan's office in Century City. Ryan worked on the design, fundraising, planning, and overseeing the construction of the Ronald Reagan Presidential Library. Ryan left his position as Chief of Staff in 1995.

== Media career ==
Following his service as Chief of Staff to former President Reagan, Ryan became vice-chairman of the television, cable, and internet company Allbritton Communications. As President and COO of the company, he managed the broadcast and cable properties.

In 2007, Ryan co-founded Politico and served as its first president and chief executive officer. During his tenure as president and CEO, Politico received its first Pulitzer Prize in 2012 and was recognized by Fast Company Magazine for Excellence as one of the "World's Most Innovative Companies" in March 2010. The May 2013 issue of Washington Life included Ryan in the "Power 100" list of the One Hundred Most Influential People in Washington.

In September 2014, Jeff Bezos, owner of The Washington Post, named Ryan Publisher and CEO. During his tenure, The Post won 13 Pulitzer Prizes and was twice recognized by Fast Company as the "World's Most Innovative Media Company." by Fast Company He guided the publication through multiple years of growth and profitability while significantly expanding its readership and subscriber base.

Ryan has advocated for the importance of independent journalism. He produced a Super Bowl ad featuring Tom Hanks to highlight the work of journalists worldwide. Ryan also founded the Press Freedom Partnership following the killing of Post journalist Jamal Khashoggi in Istanbul and the detention of Austin Tice in Syria.

To expand The Post's reach, Ryan formed created a joint venture with Creative Artists Agency and Imagine Entertainment to produce films based on its journalism.

After 9 years, Ryan stepped down from his role and helped launch the Ronald Reagan Center on Civility and Democracy.

== Reagan Foundation ==
In 1995, Ryan became the chairman of the board of trustees for the Ronald Reagan Presidential Foundation. He manages the foundation and takes part in Reagan Presidential Library events, with a mission of "preserving Ronald Reagan's legacy."

Under Ryan's chairmanship, the Reagan Foundation obtained Air Force One, the Presidential Aircraft that had flown Reagan and six other Presidents of the United States. Through funds contributed by his friend T. Boone Pickens and other donors, the Air Force One Museum was built at the Reagan Presidential Library in Simi Valley, CA. Ryan also led the launch of the Ronald Reagan Institute, a Washington-based policy center affiliated with the Reagan Presidential Foundation.

Ryan made a personal contribution to the Reagan Presidential Library by purchasing the Ronald Reagan Pub in County Tipperary, Ireland while visiting it on a family vacation in 2004. The working pub was completely disassembled and transported by container ship to Los Angeles where it was reassembled under the wing of Air Force One at the Reagan Presidential Library. Presidential journalist, Hugh Sidey, joined in for the formal dedication of the Ronald Reagan Pub at the Library. In making the gift, Ryan expressed his pride in his Irish heritage which may account for the reason he and his wife host a large St. Patrick's Day party at their Potomac, Maryland home each year.

Ryan led the team that organized the national tribute and funeral for Ronald Reagan in June 2004. He was a pallbearer at President Reagan's request.

Ryan headed the year-long celebration of Ronald Reagan's 100th Birthday in 2011. President Obama appointed him to the bipartisan Ronald Reagan Centennial Commission created by an act of Congress. Ryan was elected Chairman of the commission by the bipartisan group of United States Senators and Members of Congress that served on the commission with him. Events were held across the country and in major European Capitals celebrating the impact of Reagan policies in promoting freedom and democracy.

In the years following the Reagan Administration, Ryan was close to Nancy Reagan and is said to have advised her on important matters.

== White House Historical Association ==
Ryan served as a director of the White House Historical Association from 2001 to 2023 and from 2012-2022, he served as Chairman of White House Historical Association. He currently serves as Chairman of the White House Acquisition Trust.

As part of the "Campaign for White House History", Ryan worked with First Ladies Laura Bush, Michelle Obama, Melania Trump, and Jill Biden as well as former First Family members of both political parties to provide funding for educational and preservation projects for the White House.

David M. Rubenstein, former White House aide and philanthropist, supported this effort through a $10 million gift to create the David M. Rubenstein National Center for White House History. Another major project of the fundraising campaign was the White House Visitors Center.

== Recognition and Awards ==
Ryan's leadership in journalism and First Amendment advocacy was recognized with Adweek's "Publishing Executive of the Year Award" in 2017, the "2018 Leadership Award" from the International Women's Media Foundation, and the "2019 Freedom of Speech Award" for advancing free speech and the First Amendment by the Media Institute.

His other awards and recognition include the University of Southern California Alumni Award, the French Chevalier of Arts and Letters, Commander of the Order of Merit of the Republic of Italy, Commandeur du Ouissam Alaouite of Morocco and "Lion" of Venice. On August 23, 2025, he was awarded the "Order for Merit" by President Volodymyr Zelenskyy of Ukraine.

== Wine Writer and Author ==
Ryan authored Wine and the White House: A History (1st Ed. 2021, 2nd Ed. 2024) for the White House Historical Association. The book was recognized with 14 major book awards including the OIV Award from France. His wine writings have appeared in multiple publications, including The Wall Street Journal.

Ryan is the author of Ronald Reagan: The Great Communicator (2001, Harper Collins) and Ronald Reagan, the Wisdom and Humor of the Great Communicator (1995, Harper Collins). He also served as executive producer of the highly acclaimed documentary "The Reagan Years" (1988). In July 2026, he led the launch of The Civility Handbook produced by the Center on Civility and Democracy.

Media offices
Preceded by Katharine Weymouth	Publisher of The Washington Post; 2014 - 2023	Succeeded by William Lewis (journalist)
Preceded by Katharine Weymouth	CEO of "The Washington Post"; 2014 - 2023	Succeeded by Patty Stonesifer (interim)
