= Tumblr =

Microblogging and social networking website

- Screenshot Homepage showing a feed
- Company type: Subsidiary
- Available in: 15 languages
- List of languages Chinese (Simplified and Traditional, including Hong Kong and Taiwan), English, Dutch, French, German, Hindi, Indonesian, Italian, Japanese, Korean, Polish, Portuguese (Brazil and Portugal), Russian, Spanish, Turkish
- Founded: February 2007; 19 years ago
- Headquarters: San Francisco, California, US
- Founder: David Karp
- Key people: Matt Mullenweg (former CEO)
- Industry: Microblogging, social networking service
- Employees: 411 (as of June 2017)
- Parent: Tumblr, Inc.
- Website: tumblr.com
- Registration: Optional (required for blogging and reblogging, commenting, liking and following blogs)

Tumblr (/ˈtʌmblər/ TUM-blər) is a microblogging and social media platform founded by David Karp in 2007 and operated by American company Tumblr, Inc., a subsidiary of Automattic. The service allows users to post multimedia and other content to a short-form blog. It has attracted significant attention and controversy for hosting a wide range of progressive user-generated content.

== History ==
=== Beginnings (2006–2012) ===
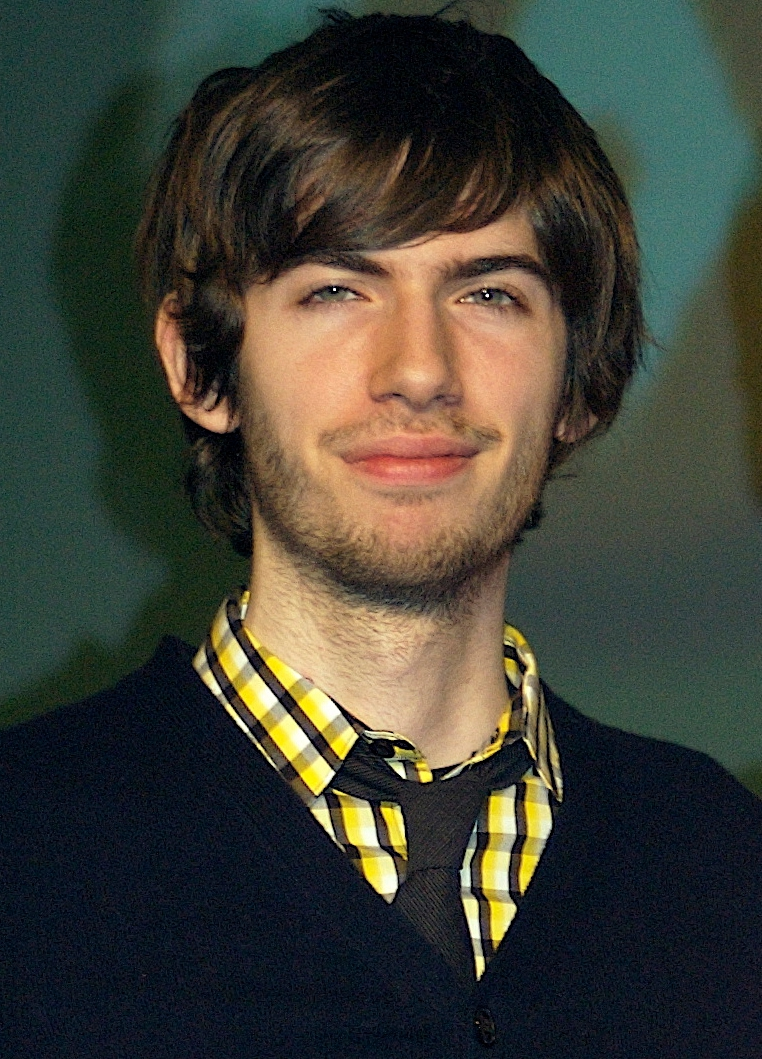
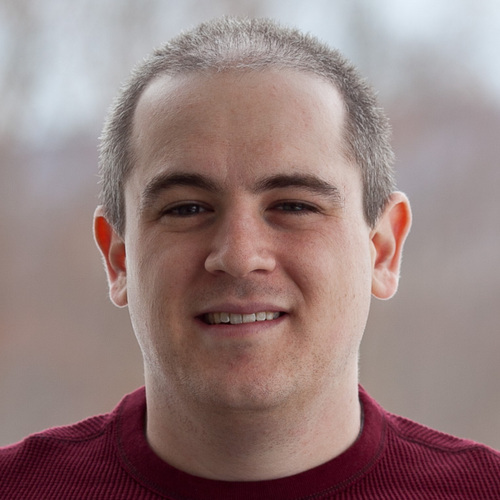
Tumblr (original logo shown) was founded by David Karp (left) and Marco Arment (right).

Development of Tumblr began in 2006 during a two-week gap between contracts at David Karp's software consulting company, Davidville. Karp had been interested in tumblelogs (short-form blogs, hence the name Tumblr) for some time and was waiting for one of the established blogging platforms to introduce their own tumblelogging platform.

As none had done so after a year of waiting, Karp and developer Marco Arment began working on their own platform. Tumblr was launched in February 2007, and within two weeks had gained 75,000 users. Arment left the company in September 2010 to work on Instapaper.

In June 2012, Tumblr featured its first major brand advertising campaign in collaboration with Adidas, who launched an official soccer Tumblr blog and bought ad placements on the user dashboard. This launch came only two months after Tumblr announced it would be moving towards paid advertising on its site.

=== Ownership by Yahoo! (2013–2018) ===
On May 20, 2013, it was announced that Yahoo and Tumblr had reached an agreement for Yahoo! Inc. to acquire Tumblr for $1.1 billion in cash. Many of Tumblr's users were unhappy with the news, causing some to start a petition, achieving nearly 170,000 signatures. David Karp remained CEO and the deal was finalized on June 20, 2013. Advertising sales goals were not met and in 2016 Yahoo wrote down $712 million of Tumblr's value.

Verizon Communications acquired Yahoo in June 2017, and placed Yahoo and Tumblr under its Oath subsidiary. Karp announced in November 2017 that he would be leaving Tumblr by the end of the year. Jeff D'Onofrio, Tumblr's president and COO, took over leading the company.

The site, along with the rest of the Oath division (renamed Verizon Media Group in 2019), continued to struggle under Verizon. In March 2019, Similarweb estimated Tumblr had lost 30% of its user traffic since December 2018, when the site had introduced a stricter content policy with heavier restrictions on adult content (which had been a notable draw to the service).

In May 2019, it was reported that Verizon was considering selling the site due to its continued struggles since the purchase (as it had done with another Yahoo property, Flickr, via its sale to SmugMug). Following this news, Pornhub's vice president publicly expressed interest in purchasing Tumblr, with a promise to reinstate the previous adult content policies.

=== Automattic (2019–present) ===
On August 12, 2019, Verizon Media announced that it would sell Tumblr to Automattic, the operator of blog service WordPress.com and corporate backer of the open source blog software of the same name. The sale was for an undisclosed amount, but Axios reported that the sale price was less than $3 million, less than 0.3% of Yahoo's original purchase price. Automattic CEO Matt Mullenweg stated that the site will operate as a complementary service to WordPress.com, and that there were no plans to reverse the content policy decisions made during Verizon ownership.

In November 2022, Mullenweg stated that Tumblr will add support for the decentralized social networking protocol ActivityPub. In November 2023, most of Tumblr's product development and marketing teams were transferred to other groups within Automattic. Mullenweg stated that focus would shift to core functionality and streamlining existing features.

In February 2024, Automattic announced that it would begin selling user data from Tumblr and WordPress.com to Midjourney and OpenAI. Tumblr users are opted-in by default, with an option to opt out.

In August 2024, Automattic announced that it would migrate Tumblr's backend to an architecture derived from WordPress, in order to ease development and code sharing between the platforms. The company stated that this migration would not impact the service's user experience and content, and that users "won't even notice a difference from the outside". In January 2025, Mullenweg stated that the migration, once completed, would also "unlock" ActivityPub access for Tumblr, including native support for the company's official ActivityPub plugin for WordPress.

In April 2025, Automattic announced layoffs for 16% of its workforce, reducing a large portion of Tumblr staff.

On March 16, 2026, Tumblr implemented a change to how notes were assigned to reblogs, making it more similar to sites like Twitter and Bluesky. The change was rolled back the next day after heavy user backlash.

== Features ==
=== Blog management ===
- Dashboard: The dashboard is the primary tool for the typical Tumblr user. It is a live feed of recent posts from blogs that they follow. Through the dashboard, users are able to comment, reblog, and like posts from other blogs that appear on their dashboard. The dashboard allows the user to upload text posts, images, videos, quotes, or links to their blog with a click of a button displayed at the top of the dashboard. Users are also able to connect their blogs to their Twitter and Facebook accounts, so that whenever they make a post, it will also be sent as a tweet and a status update. As of June 2022, users can also turn off reblogs on specific posts through the dashboard.
- Queue: Users are able to set up a schedule to delay posts that they make. They can spread their posts over several hours or even days.
- Tags: Users can help their audience find posts about certain topics by adding tags. If someone were to upload a picture to their blog and wanted their viewers to find pictures, they would add the tag #picture, and their viewers could use that word to search for posts with the tag #picture.
- HTML editing: Tumblr allows users to edit their blog's theme using HTML to control the appearance of their blog. Custom themes are able to be shared and used by other users, or sold.
- Custom domains: Tumblr allows users to use custom domains for their blogs. Users must purchase a domain from Tumblr Domains, an in-house registrar that provides domains that can only be used with Tumblr unless removed from the user's blog and transferred to another registrar. Blogs previously were able to be linked with any domain/subdomain from any registrar, however following the introduction of the Tumblr Domains service, now requires you to purchase a domain directly from Tumblr to be used with a blog. Users who kept their blogs connected to a domain after the introduction got to keep their custom domain, as long as they do not disconnect it from Tumblr or let the domain expire.

=== Tags ===
The tagging system on the website operates on a hybrid tagging system, involving both self-tagging (user write their own tags on their posts) and an auto-manual function (the website will recommend popular tags and ones that the user has used before.) Only the first 20 tags added to any post will be indexed by the site. The tags are prefaced by a hashtag and separated by commas, and spaces and special characters are allowed, but only up to 140 characters total per tag.

There are two main types used by Tumblr users: descriptive tagging, and opinion or commentary tagging. Descriptive tags are usually introduced by the original poster, and describe what is in the post (e.g. #art, #sky). These are important for the original poster to use, so their post will be indexed and searchable by others wishing to view that subject of content.

Tags used as a form of communication are unique to Tumblr, and are typically more personal, expressing opinions, reactions, meta-commentary, background information, and more. Instead of adding onto the reblogged post (with their comments becoming an addition to each subsequent reblog from them) a user may add their comments in the tags, not changing the content or appearance of the original post in any way. Not all users choose to use tags this way, but those who do use tags for commentary may prefer it over adding a comment on the actual post.

=== Mobile ===
With Tumblr's 2009 acquisition of Tumblerette, an iOS application created by Jeff Rock and Garrett Ross, the service launched its official iPhone app. The site became available to BlackBerry smartphones on April 17, 2010, via a Mobelux application in BlackBerry World. In June 2012, Tumblr released a new version of its iOS app, Tumblr 3.0, allowing support for Spotify integration, hi-res images and offline access. An app for Android is also available. A Windows Phone app was released on April 23, 2013. An app for Google Glass was released on May 16, 2013.

=== Inbox and messaging ===
Tumblr blogs have the option to allow users to submit questions, either as themselves or anonymously, to the blog for a response. Tumblr also previously offered a "fan mail" function, allowing users to send messages to blogs that they followed.

On November 10, 2015, Tumblr introduced an integrated instant messaging function, allowing users to chat with other Tumblr users. The feature was rolled out in a "viral" manner; it was initially made available to a group of 1,500 users, and other users could receive access to the messaging system if they were sent a message by any user that had received access to the system itself. The messaging platform replaces the fan mail system, which was deprecated. The ability to send posts to others via the Dashboard was added the following month.

=== Discontinued features ===
In May 2012, Tumblr launched Storyboard, a blog managed by an in-house editorial team which features stories and videos about noteworthy blogs and users on Tumblr. In April 2013, Storyboard was shut down.

In March 2018, Tumblr began to syndicate original video content from Verizon-owned video network go90, as part of an ongoing integration of Oath properties, and reported plans to wind down go90 in favor of using Oath properties to distribute its content instead. This made the respective content available internationally, since go90 is a U.S.-only service. Go90 shut down at the end of the following July.

In November 2019, Tumblr introduced "group chats"—ephemeral chat rooms surfaced via searches, designed to allow users to share content in real-time with users who share their interests. Posts would disappear after 24 hours and could not be edited. The group chat function was discontinued on September 22, 2021.

On July 21, 2021, Tumblr launched Post+ for some beta users, allowing bloggers to monetize their content. Post+ was removed in January 2024 due to low usage.

At the end of 2022, Tumblr announced a livestreaming service called Tumblr Live. Tumblr Live was an adapted version of The Meet Group's product Livebox. In 2024, Tumblr announced that they would be discontinuing Tumblr Live as of January 24, with options for users to migrate to MeetMe.

A feature that allowed users to tip small amounts of money to other users, introduced in February 2022, was removed on June 1, 2024, due to low usage.

== Usage ==
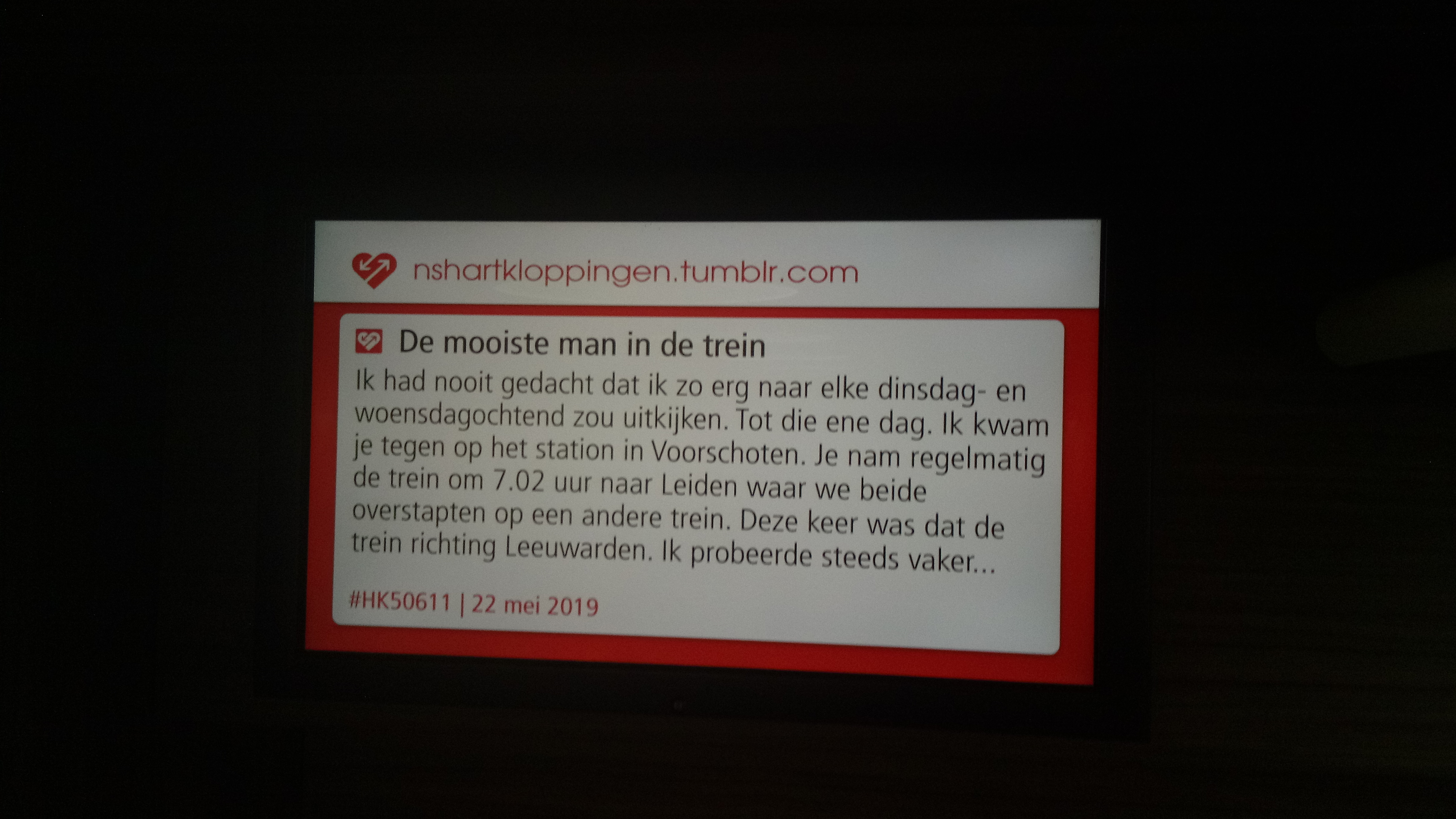
A Tumblr blog post shown on an information screen in a Dutch train station, 2019

Tumblr has been noted for the socially progressive views of its users. In 2011, the service was most popular with the teen and college-aged user segments, with half of Tumblr's visitor base being under the age of 25. In April 2013, the website received more than 13 billion global page views.

User activity, measured by the number of blog posts per quarter, peaked at over 100 million in early 2014 and declined in each of the next three years, to approximately 30 million by October 2018.

As of May 2019, Tumblr hosted over 465 million blogs and more than 172 billion posts in total with over 21 million posts created on the site each day.

According to then-CEO Jeff D'Onofrio, members of Generation Z made up 48% of active and 61% of new users, reflecting a resurgence in activity on the platform.

=== LGBTQ+ content and community ===
Multiple researchers looking into Tumblr have found that the website is often used for community-building and a place to explore identity formation and gender expression for LGBTQ+ groups. Prior to the 2018 adult content ban, transgender users posted their personal gender transitioning experiences, including photos of post gender-confirming surgery and the healing process.

Many users felt that the ability to be anonymous, or cultivate the identity they were transitioning to, made posting personal information to the website acceptable and safe. In more recent times, however, the LGBTQ+ community on Tumblr has been subject to transphobic moderation practices, including actions by Matt Mullenweg, the most recent CEO.

=== Adult content ===
At the time of its acquisition by Yahoo, Tumblr was described by technology journalists as having a sizable amount of pornographic content. An analysis conducted by news and technology site TechCrunch on May 20, 2013, showed that over 22% of all traffic in and out of Tumblr was classified as pornography. In addition, a reported 16.45% of blogs on Tumblr exclusively contained pornographic material.

Following July 2013 and its acquisition by Yahoo, Tumblr progressively restricted adult content on the site. In July 2013, Tumblr began to filter content in adult-tagged blogs from appearing in search results and tagged displays unless the user was logged in. In February 2018, Safe Mode (which filters "sensitive" content and blogs) became enabled by default for all users on an opt-out basis.

On December 3, 2018, Tumblr announced that effective December 17, all images and videos depicting sex acts, and real-life images and videos depicting human genitalia or "female-presenting" nipples, would be banned from the service. Exceptions are provided for illustrations or art that depict nudity, nudity related to "political or newsworthy speech", and depictions of "female-presenting" nipples in relation to medical events such as childbirth, breastfeeding, mastectomy and gender reassignment surgery. The rules do not apply to text content.

All posts in violation of the policy are hidden from public view, and repeat offenders may be reprimanded. Shortly prior to the announcement, Tumblr's Android app was patched to remove the ability to disable Safe Mode.

The change faced wide criticism among Tumblr's community; in particular, it has been argued that the service should have focused on other major issues (such as controlling hate speech or the number of porn-related spambots on the service), and that the service's adult community provided a platform for sex education, independent adult performers (especially those representing LGBTQ+ communities who feel that they are under-represented by a heteronormative mainstream industry) seeking an outlet for their work, and those seeking a safe haven from "over-policed" platforms to share creative work with adult themes.

Tumblr stated that it was using various algorithms to detect potential violations, in combination with manual reviews. Users quickly discovered a wide array of false positives. A large number of users scheduled protest actions on December 17.

On the day the ban took effect, Tumblr issued a new post clarifying the new policy, showcasing examples of adult images still allowed on the service, and stating that it "fully recognized" its "special obligation" to serving its LGBTQ userbase, and that "LGBTQ+ conversations, exploration of sexuality and gender, efforts to document the lives and challenges of those in the sex worker industry, and posts with pictures, videos, and GIFs of gender reassignment surgery are all examples of content that is not only permitted on Tumblr but actively encouraged."

Wired cited multiple potential factors in the ban, including that the presence of adult content made the service unappealing to potential advertisers, the Stop Enabling Sex Traffickers Act (a U.S. federal law which makes websites liable for knowingly assisting or facilitating illegal sex trafficking), as well as heavy restrictions on adult content imposed by Apple for software offered on the iOS App Store (which similarly prompted several Reddit clients to heavily frustrate the ability for users to access forums on the site that contain adult content).

In January 2022, Tumblr reached a settlement with New York City's Commission on Human Rights, which had claimed that the 2018 ban on adult content disproportionately affected LGBTQ+ users. The agreement required the company to review its algorithms, revise its appeals process and review closed cases, and train its human moderators on diversity and inclusion issues. In November 2022, Tumblr changed its rules to allow nudity, but not sexually explicit images.

== Corporate affairs ==
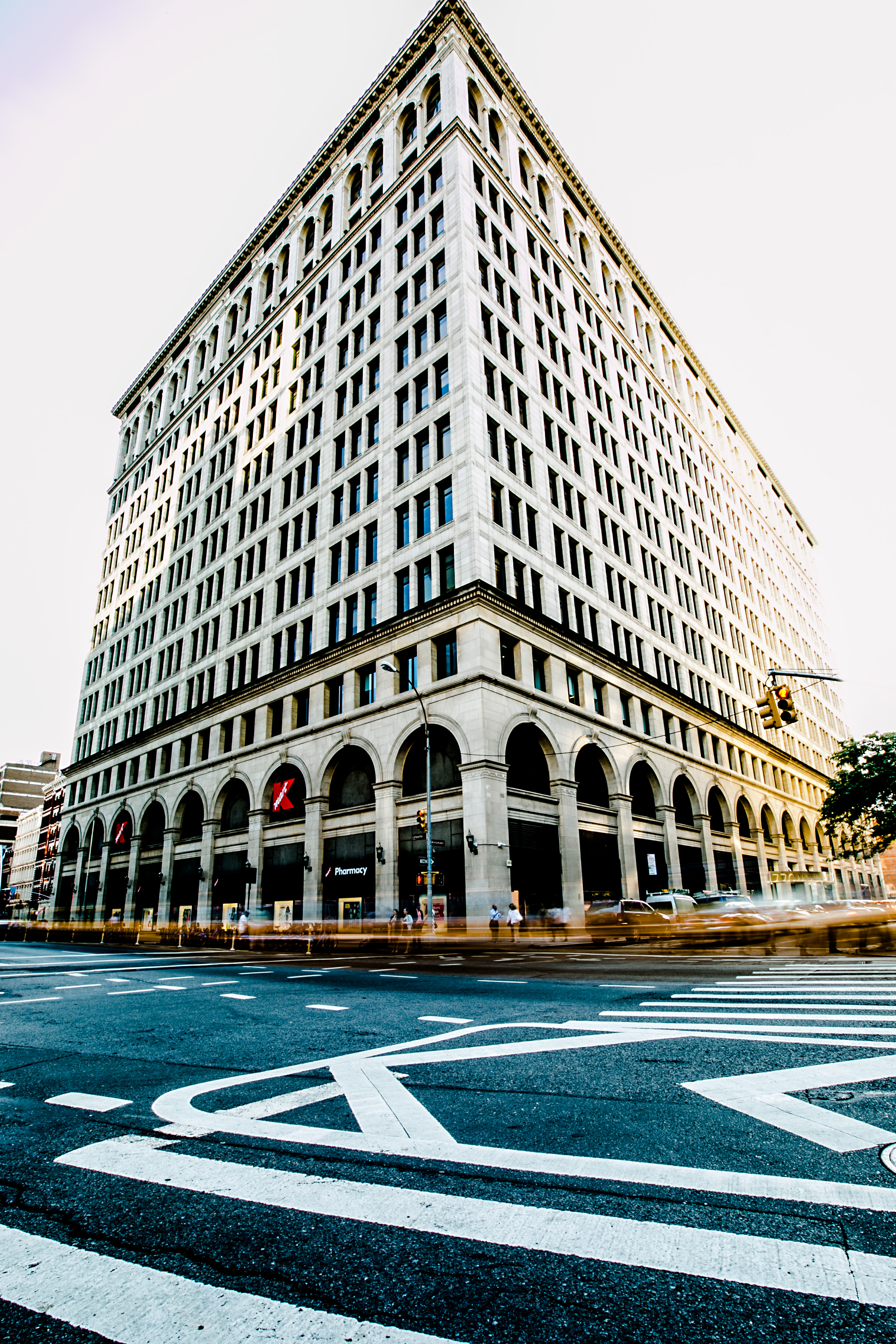
Tumblr's headquarters were located in the 770 Broadway building in New York City.

Tumblr's headquarters were at 770 Broadway in New York City. The company also maintains a support office in Richmond, Virginia. As of June 1, 2017, Tumblr had 411 employees. Tumblr (and Automattic) now has a mostly distributed workforce, with a small office in San Francisco.

The company's logo is set in Bookman Old Style with some modifications.

=== Funding ===
As of 2011, Tumblr had received about $125 million of funding from investors. The company has raised funding from Union Square Ventures, Spark Capital, Martín Varsavsky, John Borthwick (Betaworks), Fred Seibert, Krum Capital, and Sequoia Capital (among other investors).

In its first round of funding in October 2007, Tumblr raised $750,000 from Spark Capital and Union Square Ventures. In December 2008 the company raised $4.5 million in Series B funding and a further $5 million in April 2010. In December 2010, Tumblr raised $30 million in Series D funding. The company had an $800 million valuation in August 2011. In September 2011, the company raised $85 million in a round of funding led by Greylock Partners and Insight Venture Partners.

=== Revenue sources ===
In an interview with Nicole Lapin of Bloomberg West on September 7, 2012, David Karp said the site was monetized by advertising. Their first advertising launch started in May 2012 after 16 experimental campaigns. Tumblr made $13 million in revenue in 2012 and hoped to make $100 million in 2013. Tumblr reportedly spent $25 million to fund operations in 2012.

In 2013, Tumblr began allowing companies to pay to promote their own posts to a larger audience. Tumblr Head of Sales, Lee Brown, has quoted the average ad purchase on Tumblr to be nearly six figures. Tumblr also allows premium theme templates to be sold for use by blogs.

In July 2016, advertisements were implemented by default across all blogs. Users may opt-out, and the service stated that a revenue sharing program would be implemented at a later date.

In February 2022, Tumblr launched an ad-free subscription option that removes the marketing from microblogs for $5 per month, or $40 per year.

During an AMA on July 11, 2023, the CEO said that Tumblr was financially in the red, losing $30 million a year.

== Criticism ==
=== Copyright issues ===
Tumblr has received criticism for copyright violations by participating bloggers; however, Tumblr accepts Digital Millennium Copyright Act (DMCA) take-down notices. Tumblr's visual appeal has made it ideal for photoblogs that often include copyrighted works from others that are re-published without payment. Tumblr users can post unoriginal content by "Reblogging", a feature on Tumblr that allows users to re-post content taken from another blog onto their own blog with attribution.

In addition to these copyright infringements, Tumblr has at times been weaponized by individuals seeking to raise DMCA notices against other sites. Investigative news site Project Brazen stated that, shortly after publishing a story on 10 October 2023, an account was created on Tumblr that republished the content of their story and backdated it to 8 October 2023, two days before their article came out. Following a copyright infringement complaint filed on legal archive Lumen and without checking the veracity of the source, Google delisted the Project Brazen article. After learning of the complaint, Tumblr removed the account and its posts.

=== Security ===
Tumblr has been forced to manage spam and security problems. For example, a chain letter scam in May 2011 affected 130,000 users.

On December 3, 2012, Tumblr was attacked by a cross-site scripting worm deployed by the internet troll group Gay Nigger Association of America. The message urged users to harm themselves and criticized blogging in general.

=== User interface changes ===
In 2015, Tumblr faced criticism by users for changes to its reblog mechanisms. In July 2015, the system was modified so that users cannot remove or edit individual comments by other users when reblogging a post; existing comments can only be removed all at once. Tumblr staff argued that the change was intended to combat "misattribution", though this move was met by criticism from 'ask blogs' and "RP blogs', which often shortened long chains of reblogs between users to improve readability.

In September 2015, Tumblr changed how threads of comments on reblogged posts are displayed; rather than a nested view with indentations for each post, all reblogs are now shown in a flat view, and user avatars were also added. The change was intended to improve the legibility of reblogs, especially on mobile platforms, and complements the inability to edit existing comments.

Although some users had requested such a change to combat posts made illegible by extremely large numbers of comments on a reblogged post, the majority of users (even those who had requested such a change) criticized the new format. The Verge was also critical of the changes, noting that it was cleaner, but made the site lose its "nostalgic charm".

=== Userbase behaviour ===
While Tumblr's userbase has generally been received as accommodating people from a wide range of ideologies and identities, a common point of criticism is that attitudes from users on the site stifle discussion and discourse. In 2015, members of the Steven Universe fandom on Tumblr drove a fan artist to the point of attempting suicide via bullying them over their work, which depicted characters from the series in their own style; the abuse stemmed from the artist's depiction of 'fat' characters as being thin. In 2018, Kotaku reporter Gita Jackson described the site as a 'joyless black hole', citing how the website's design and functionality led to 'fandoms spinning out of control', as well as an environment that inhibited discussion and discourse.

=== Promotion of self-harm and suicide ===
In February 2012, Tumblr banned blogs that promote or advocate suicide, self-harm and eating disorders (pro-ana).

The suicide of a British teenager, Tallulah Wilson, raised the issue of suicide and self-harm promotion on Tumblr as Wilson was reported to have maintained a self-harm blog on the site. A user on the site is reported to have sent Wilson an image of a noose accompanied by the message: "here is your new necklace, try it on." In response to the Wilson case, Maria Miller, the UK's minister for culture, media, and sport at the time, said that social media sites like Tumblr needed to remove "toxic" self-harm content.

Searching terms like "depression", "anxiety", and "suicide" on Tumblr now brings up a PSA page directing the user to resources like the National Suicide Prevention Lifeline, The Trevor Project, the National Eating Disorders Association, and RAINN, as well as an option to continue to the search results.

There are concerns of some Tumblr posts glorifying suicide and depression among young people.

=== Politics ===
In February 2018, BuzzFeed published a report claiming that Tumblr was utilized as a distribution channel for Russian agents to influence American voting habits during the 2016 presidential election.

Despite policies forbidding hate speech, Tumblr has been noted for hosting content from Neo-Nazis and white supremacists. In May 2020, Tumblr announced that it would remove reblogs of terminated hate speech posts, specifically Nazi and white supremacist content.

=== Censorship ===
Several countries have blocked access to Tumblr because of pornography, religious extremism or LGBTQ content. These countries include China, Indonesia, Kazakhstan and Iran. In February 2016, the Indonesian government temporarily blocked access to Tumblr within the country because the site hosted pages that carried pornography. The government shortly reversed its decision to block the site and said it had asked Tumblr to self-censor its pornographic content.

==== Adult content ban ====
In November 2018, Tumblr's iOS app was removed by Apple from its App Store after illegal child pornography was found on the service. Tumblr stated that all images uploaded to the service are scanned against an industry database, but that a "routine audit" had revealed images that had not yet been added to the database. In the wake of the incident, a number of Tumblr blogs—particularly those dealing primarily in adult-tagged artwork such as erotica, as well as art study and anatomy resources—were also deleted, with affected users taking to other platforms (such as Twitter) to warn others and complain about the deletions, as well as encourage users to back up their blog's contents.

Tumblr subsequently removed the ability to disable "safe mode" from its Android app, and announced a wider ban on explicit images of sex acts and nudity on the platform, with certain limited exceptions. Tumblr deployed an automatic content recognition system which resulted in many non-pornographic images being removed. In December 2018, about a month after it was banned, Tumblr's iOS app was restored to the App Store.

In 2019, Cosmopolitan wrote that Tumblr had been known for providing adult content that attracted women and catered for other under-served audiences.

=== Transphobia ===
Tumblr and its users often spar about the application of the website's adult content ban allegedly being maliciously misused to target transgender people, especially transgender women. Repeated bans of black, transgender, as well as leftist political blogs removed alongside alleged legitimate propaganda accounts accused of election interference during the 2020 and 2024 US presidential elections have led affected communities to view Tumblr as an anti-black, transphobic, rainbow capitalist, and rightist website, though with a larger focus on its alleged history of transphobia.

==== January 2022 ====
In January 2022, Tumblr came under fire as the Commission Law Enforcement Bureau began investigating the use of the website's adult content ban disproportionately targeting LGBTQ posts. This was quickly followed by a stipulation and order between the New York City Commission on Human Rights (NYCCHR) and Tumblr titled Settlement of Complaint Tumblr Inc. v. NYCCHR in 2022 (Tumblr Nycchr Settlement).

Highlights of the settlement include:

- The mandatory hiring of a sexual orientation and gender identity (SOGI) trainer for Tumblr content moderation employees who provides at least 2 hours of interactive cissexism knowledge and avoidance training,
- Providing the name and qualifications of the SOGI trainer, as well as a draft of their training materials, to the NYCCHR within 90 calendar days,
- An electronic attendance sheet for the SOGI trainer whose attendance data would be provided to the NYCCHR for 90 calendar days,
- Proof of completion of SOGI training by the SOGI trainer provided to the NYCCHR within 10 calendar days, which could anonymize SOGI trainees in accordance with data protection compliance, including GDPR,
- Required SOGI training by the SOGI trainer for all Tumblr employees, agents, interns, and independent contractors who work on the adult content classifier, globally, within 120 calendar days following the Tumblr NYCCHR Settlement,
- Required revision of the adult content appeal form to include text and text entry boxes within 90 calendar days,
- Required revision of adult content appeal reviews to include searching for SOGI terms within 60 calendar days,
- Required manual review of 500 appeals from 6 days (for a total of 3,000 flagged posts) randomly selected within 1 day from the past 6 months prior to the Tumblr NYCCHR Settlement to then be provided to the NYCCHR for review of SOGI bias, including using a random sample of 500 or 75% (whichever amount was smaller) of the incorrectly flagged images and subsequent successful appeals to retrain the adult content classifier on a monthly basis,
- Required reporting of the number of SOGI-related appeals from the first business day of the second month following the Tumblr Nycchr Settlement and continuing for the next 18 months to the NYCCHR, including monthly reports of the monthly number and percentage (of the whole of appeals) of SOGI-related appeals, plus the same information from the prior month, within 10 business days of the first business day of each month,
- An allocation for Tumblr to request being absolved from any infeasible steps of the prior list with NYCCHR approval, which would require a detailed description of why it was infeasible, including economic records if the reason presented were economic,
- A required review report of the classifier expert's analysis of the adult content classifier's SOGI bias, steps taken to correct the bias, and ultimate evaluation of the adult content classifier and SOGI discrimination written in plain English and submitted to the NYCCHR within 180 calendar days of the Tumblr NYCCHR Settlement,
- Required public posting of new company obligations under the Tumblr NYCCHR Settlement in the employee notice area in compliance with NYC Human Rights Law (NYCHRL), alongside the commission's Notice of Rights and LGBTQ Rights posters in both English and Spanish in colour, with proof of compliance submitted to the NYCCHR, within 30 calendar days of the Tumblr NYCCHR Settlement, and
- A required assignment of 9 Tumblr employees to assist with Tumblr NYCCHR Settlement processes and reviews as needed for at least 6 months following the settlement

==== February 2024 ====
In February 2024, Tumblr CEO Matt Mullenweg (under his alias, photomatt) personally enforced and responded to the banning of the user predstrogen (who is often referred to as Rita) for her alleged death threats against the CEO, where she made a post stating the following:

I hope photomatt dies forever a painful death involving a car covered in hammers that explodes more than a few times and hammers go flying everywhere.

She later continued the thread:

How long until death wishes against the CEO get me banned or flagged. Right now I'm pissed off enugh that I want to find out

Mullenweg later suggested this was a request to be banned as a martyr in a public response on Tumblr. The situation quickly devolved into an elaborate argument between the two users, ultimately culminating in a potentially illegal disclosure of Rita's private side-blog information by Mullenweg. This is often satirically referred to as the Hammercar Incident or Mullenweg Meltdown. Black and transgender users of the site have alleged that this is connected to a larger rightward movement on the site, including in Tumblr staff, despite Mullenweg and Tumblr staff's public disagreements.

== Notable events ==
On October 21, 2011, then-U.S. President Barack Obama created a Tumblr account.

In late 2015, a user on the website went viral after allegedly having collected human bones at a graveyard, sparking a controversy known as "Boneghazi" (a portmanteau of bone + Benghazi). The user, from New Orleans, Louisiana, had offered to share the human bones reportedly procured from Holt Cemetery by making a post in a Facebook group known as the "Queer Witch Collective". The Facebook post was later re-posted to Tumblr by another user, and the account from Facebook was traced to a profile on Tumblr due to the profile pictures matching. In January 2016, the user's home was searched by law enforcement, where they found 11 bones and four teeth.

== See also ==
- Comparison of microblogging and similar services
- Comparison of free blog hosting services
- List of social networking services
