= 1975–1976 Washington Post pressmen's strike =

Strike action by The Washington Post's pressmen

The 1975–1976 Washington Post pressmen's strike was a strike action by The Washington Post's pressmen. The strike began on October 1, 1975. The Washington Post hired replacement workers to replace the union in December 1975. The last unions supporting the pressmen's strike returned to work in February 1976.

The Post had previously agreed to the demands of a strike by the printer's guild in 1973, while a strike by the Newspaper Guild in 1974 had failed to find support by other unions. The pressmen's strike also had trouble in finding support. Over 500 journalists refused to support the strike.

== Background ==
Eugene Meyer purchased the Washington Post at a bankruptcy auction in 1933 and generally had a good relationship with labor unions at the company. In 1946, his son-in-law Phil Graham took over as publisher, and Meyer's daughter Katharine Graham took over in 1963 after Phil Graham's suicide. The Post became a publicly-traded company in 1971.

The Post had suffered multiple strikes in previous years. In 1973, the printer's guild went on strike, and management quickly agreed to demands. In 1974, the Newspaper Guild went on strike, but other unions did not support the strike.

== Preparation ==
In preparation for an expected strike, the Post sent executives to the Newspaper Production Research Center in Oklahoma to learn how to operate presses. Preparations had started over two years before the strike began.

== Start of the strike ==
The strike began in the early-morning hours of October 1. Around 4AM, a group of pressmen disabled the printing presses and causing other damage. The damage was initially reported by the Post as being in the millions; later estimates by the Post were of $269,000 in damages. Other sources gave even lower damage estimates of $12,900.

The Washington Post did not publish a paper on October 2 as a result of the damage to the presses.

Later, the Post used a helicopter to access the building during the strike. This required special approval from the State Department due to restricted airspace in Washington D.C.

Multiple other unions refused to cross the picket line of the pressmen and engaged in strikes of their own. The main exception was the Newspaper's Guild; over 500 journalists refused to support the strike.

== Negotiations ==
The strike initially had a dramatic effect on the Post's circulation and revenue. The Post estimated that in the first two weeks of the strike, they lost $3 million in revenue. By December, the Post's revenues had significantly recovered, but were still below pre-strike levels.

In December 1975, the Post began to hire replacement workers to replace the pressmen's union. Many of them were African-American, in contrast to the mostly-white pressmen's union.

In February 1976, the Post reached an agreement with the remaining unions, which ended their sympathy strikes. The mailers' union reached an agreement on February 15.

== Aftermath and impact ==
The outcome of the strike was viewed as a victory for the Post and a defeat for the labor unions involved. The Post was estimated to save $2 million in 1976 as a result of hiring non-union pressmen.

On October 2, 1976, to commemorate the 1-year anniversary of the start of the strike, a crowd of over 1000 supporting the pressmen met at McPherson Square. They proceeded to the Post's headquarters, where they burned Graham in effigy.

In May 1977, 14 pressmen were sentenced for their participation in the initial sabotage; sentences ranged from fines to 1 year in jail.
