= Sally Buzbee =

American journalist and editor

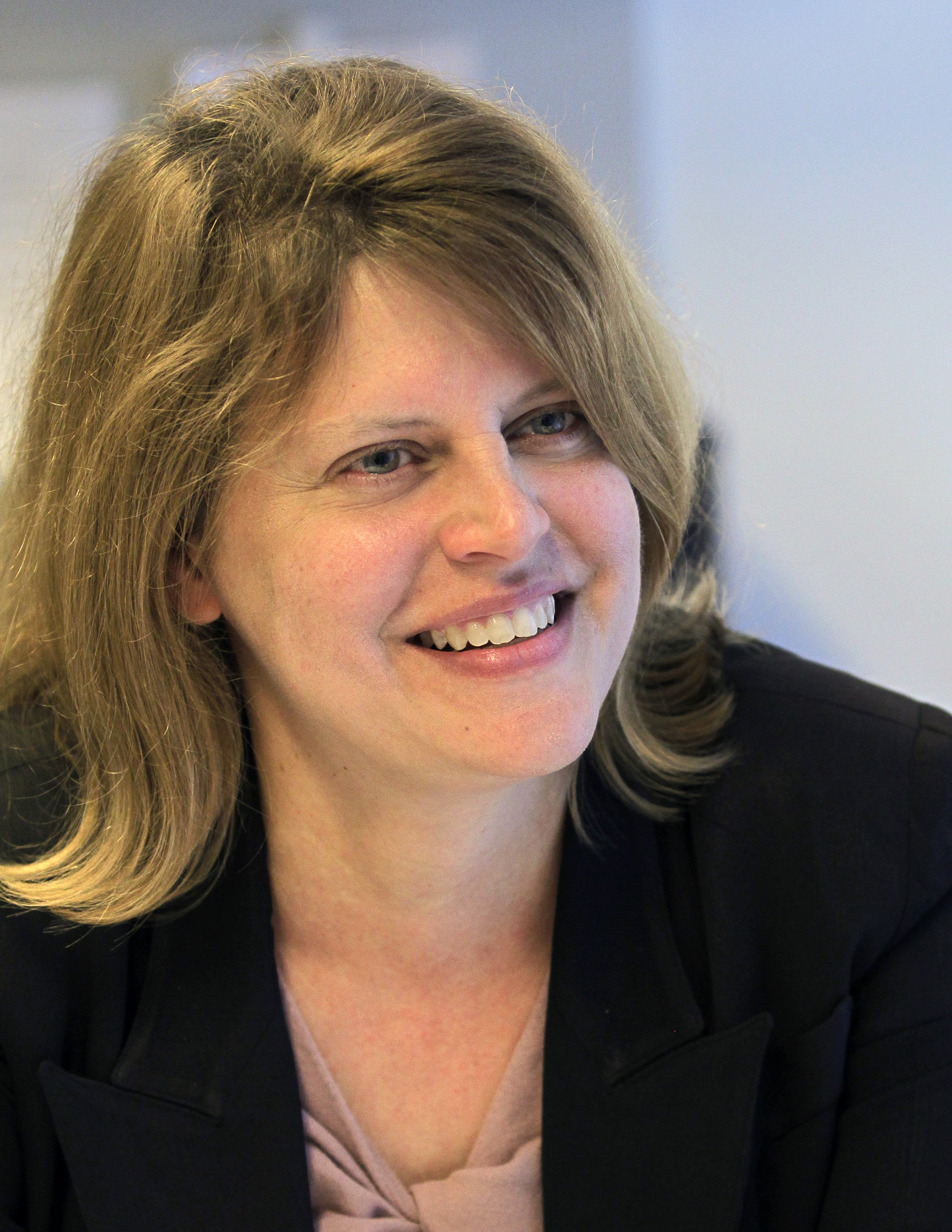
- Buzbee in 2010
- Born: Sally Streff; 1965 or 1966 (age 59–60); Walla Walla, Washington, U.S.
- Education: University of Kansas (BA); Georgetown University (MBA)
- Occupations: Journalist; editor
- Spouse: John Buzbee (died 2016)

Sally Streff Buzbee (born 1965 or 1966) is an American journalist and former executive editor of The Washington Post who started working for Reuters as their News Editor for the United States and Canada on December 11, 2024.

Before joining the Post, Buzbee worked at the Associated Press for more than three decades, serving as executive editor and senior vice president for the last four-and-a-half years of her tenure.

== Early life and education ==
Sally Streff was born in Walla Walla, Washington. She lived in the Bay Area and the suburbs of Dallas before graduating from high school in Olathe, Kansas. She earned a bachelor's degree from the University of Kansas and joined the Associated Press in 1988. She earned her Master of Business Administration from Georgetown University.

== Career ==
Buzbee began her career with the Associated Press as a reporter in Topeka and San Diego. She later worked as the organization's Middle East regional editor, based in Cairo. She returned to the United States to be the AP's Washington bureau chief during the 2012 and 2016 elections. In 2017, Buzbee became senior vice president and executive editor of AP.

When Buzbee became executive editor of The Washington Post on June 1, 2021, she was the paper's first female editor-in-chief. In a November 2021 interview with Kara Swisher, Buzbee said the journalistic independence of The Washington Post from its billionaire owner Jeff Bezos was "never in question at any point" during her hiring process. After Sir William Lewis became the CEO and publisher in January 2024, he pushed Buzbee to not run unflattering stories about him. She abruptly stepped down on June 2, 2024 "amid a broader shake-up."

== Awards ==
- 2019 William Allen White Award
- 2021 'Badass 50' list.

== Marriage ==
Buzbee's husband, John Buzbee, served as a Foreign Service officer and Middle East specialist. He died on September 15, 2016, at the age of 50, from Colorectal cancer.

Media offices
Preceded by Martin Baron	Executive Editor of The Washington Post; June 1, 2021 – June 2, 2024	Succeeded by Matt Murray
