= Patty Stonesifer =

American businesswoman (born 1956)

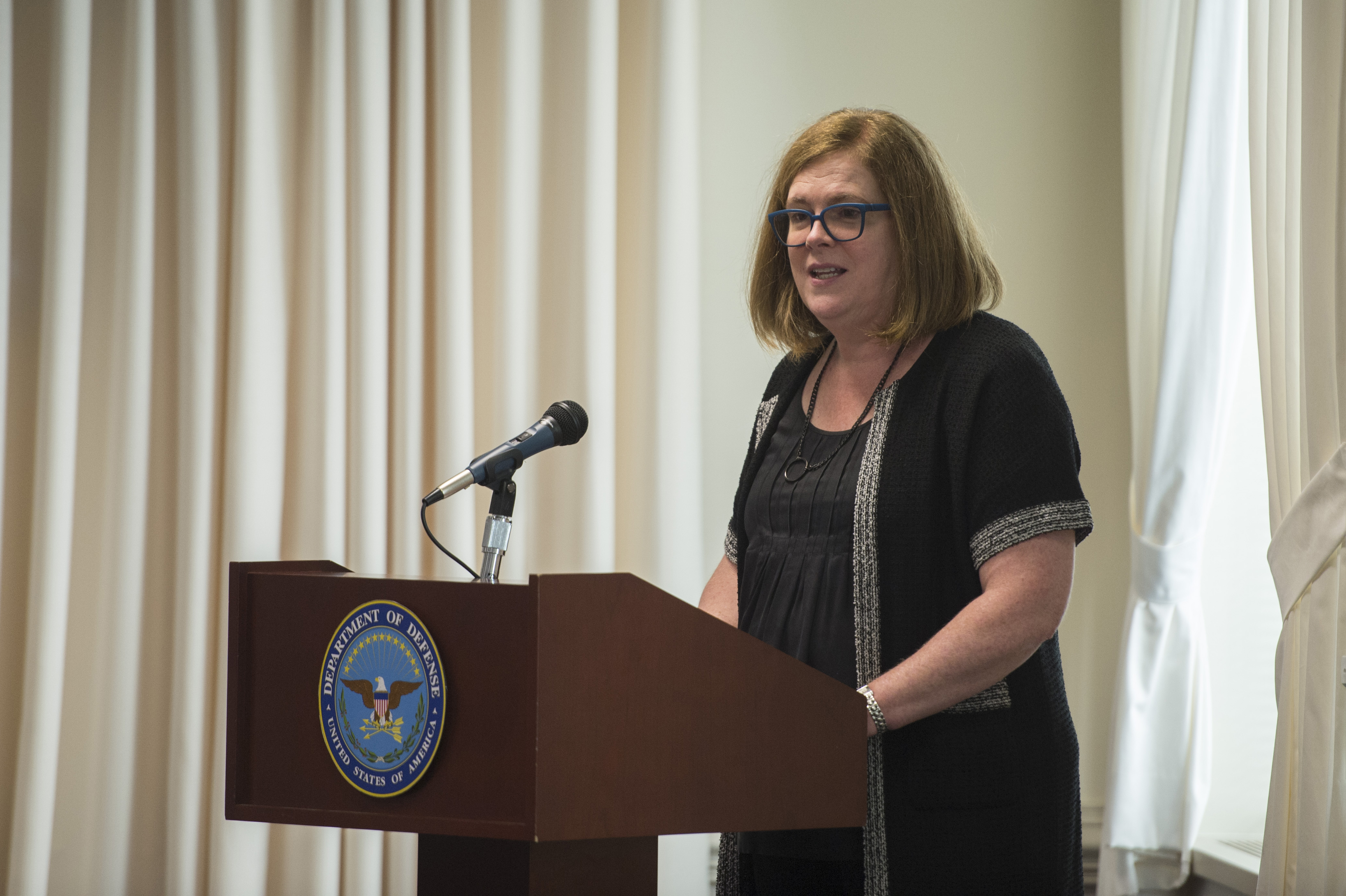
- Stonesifer in 2015
- Born: 1956 (age 68–69); Indianapolis, Indiana, U.S.
- Education: Indiana University, Bloomington (BA)
- Occupation(s): Interim CEO, The Washington Post; Board Member Amazon, Rockefeller Foundation, Co-Impact and TheDream.us
- Spouse: Michael Kinsley
- Children: 2

Patricia Q. Stonesifer /ˈstoʊnsaɪfər/ (born 1956) is an American executive. From June 2023 to January 2024, she was the interim CEO of The Washington Post and is on the board of Amazon. She began her career in various executive roles at Microsoft before becoming the founding CEO of the Bill & Melinda Gates Foundation. She previously was the president and CEO of Martha's Table, a Washington D.C.–based non-profit that provides community-based solutions to poverty.

== Early life and education ==
Born in Indianapolis, Indiana, Stonesifer is the sixth of nine children in a Roman Catholic family. Her father, Bill Quigley, was a car salesman and her mother was a physical therapist. Volunteering was a core value of her family and childhood; in addition to the nine children, the family hosted foster children for "a significant part of the time that I was growing up". She graduated from Indiana University in 1982.

== Career ==
=== Technology ===
Stonesifer spent two decades working at for-profit technology companies as a consultant to DreamWorks SKG and at Microsoft in various vice president positions. She began her tenure at Microsoft in 1988 running its Canadian division before being promoted to vice president and revamping Microsoft's Product Support operations. Later she oversaw the Consumer Products Group and served as senior vice president of the Interactive Media Division. In the latter position, Stonesifer was responsible for an $800 million business responsible for interactive entertainment, news, information and service products, and she oversaw the launch of MSNBC (cable TV) and MSN. The Interactive Media Division produced software titles including Encarta Encyclopedia, Magic School Bus Series and Microsoft Flight Simulator. In 1996 she negotiated a Microsoft and DreamWorks SKG joint venture, DreamWorks Interactive, which was subsequently acquired by Electronic Arts.

In July 1996, while she worked at Microsoft, she was named as one of the 25 Most Influential People in America by Time. By the time she left Microsoft in 1997, she was the highest-ranking woman there.

=== Nonprofit work ===
She helped Bill and Melinda Gates found their foundation, growing it from its inception in 1997 to the world's largest philanthropy with 500 employees by the time she stepped down in 2008. In 1997, Bill and Melinda Gates asked Stonesifer to launch the Gates Library Foundation, which later merged with the William H. Gates Foundation in 2000. She was its CEO from 2006 to 2008 and President and co-chair from 1997 to 2006. Even after she stepped down, she continued her involvement as senior advisor until January 2012.

Next, she served as chair of the Board of Regents of the Smithsonian Institution, a position created as part of the Smithsonian's large-scale reform, from January 2009 to January 2012 and as Vice Chair from January 2012 to January 2013.

Stonesifer is a founding board member of the Academy of Interactive Arts and Sciences. She served on the board of the GAVI Fund, which helps to provide vaccines to developing countries. Stonesifer has also served on the U.S. delegation to the United Nations General Assembly Special Session on AIDS. She is a founding co-chair of the CITIES board, which promotes expanding the use of technology in Seattle's community colleges.

Stonesifer donates both time and resources to a number of other regional nonprofit organizations; serves on the boards of the National Museum of African American History and Culture, Center for Global Development, and the Broad Institute; is a member of the Circle of Allies and Champions for the National Council of Young Leaders, the advisory board for America Achieves, and the executive committee of RaiseDC; and is a Hope Street Group advisor. Stonesifer served as a member of the U.S. delegation to the Joint United Nations Programme on HIV/AIDS and is a member of the American Academy of Arts and Sciences and the Council on Foreign Relations.

In 2010, President Barack Obama appointed Stonesifer to serve as the Chair of the White House Council for Community Solutions.

== Personal life ==
Stonesifer has received honorary degrees from Tufts University, Rensselaer Polytechnic Institute, Trinity University, and American University, in addition to her alma mater.

She is married to Michael Kinsley, a political columnist and founding editor of the Microsoft-funded online journal Slate. She has two children, a son and a daughter, from a previous marriage, as well as two grandchildren.

Media offices
Preceded by Fred Ryan	CEO of "The Washington Post"; 2023 - 2024 (interim)	Succeeded by William Lewis (journalist)
