= VIVmag =

VIVmag is one of the earliest exclusively digital, interactive women's lifestyle magazines. Launched in 2006 and backed by Canadian industrialist David Gilmour (the founder of Fiji Water), the bimonthly magazine is distributed by Zinio Systems, Inc. The first issue appeared in January–February 2007. There is no print version. The paperless title can be viewed in most browsers or downloaded to your computer and read via the Zinio Reader. The magazine is based in Thousand Oaks, California.

Editor in chief Anne M. Russell is the former editor of Shape magazine and, like Shape, VIVmag offers service journalism in areas of fashion, beauty and nutrition, in addition to overall fitness and health. VIVmag, however, targets a slightly older (35+), more upscale demographic. The magazine had a robust staff of affluent women from advertising and media at its state-side helm, Jeanniey Mullen was its CMO, Adrienne A.Wallace formerly of Time Warner and EMI was the Global Vice President of Marketing, and Jocelyn R. Taylor, formerly of UPTOWN Magazine was its Publisher.
