= Service journalism =

Consumer-oriented features and advice

Service journalism is journalism focused on providing useful information and advice to readers, particularly consumer information.

While public service journalism is about reporting issues that concern citizens and equipping them to form reasoned opinions on matters of shared interest, service journalism is generally consumer-oriented and includes advice, ranging from the serious to the frivolous. Service journalism is "actionable" for the reader and is described as "news you can use".

== History ==
Service journalism was pioneered in part by Clay Felker, who launched New York magazine in 1968. Published among lengthy investigative and literary pieces were tips and features on fashion, food, and travel. Service journalism appears in magazines as varied as Maxim and U.S. News & World Report.

News publishers perceived less relevance for service journalism in 2025, concurrent with the general availability of generative AI.

== Selected magazines ==
- Better Homes and Gardens
- Cosmopolitan
- Family Circle
- FHM
- Glamour
- Good Housekeeping
- Health
- Marie Claire
- Men's Fitness
- Maxim
- Ladies' Home Journal
- Men's Health
- More
- Redbook
- Seventeen
- Self
- Shape
- VIVmag
- Women's Health
