= List of artwork associated with Agnes E. Meyer =

List of artwork associated with Agnes E. Meyer includes works donated by her and her husband Eugene Meyer to the National Gallery of Art, or works of her.

== National Gallery of Art ==
A selection of pieces of art donated to the National Gallery of Art in Washington, DC. by Eugene and Agnes E. Meyer.

=== Antoine-Louis Barye ===
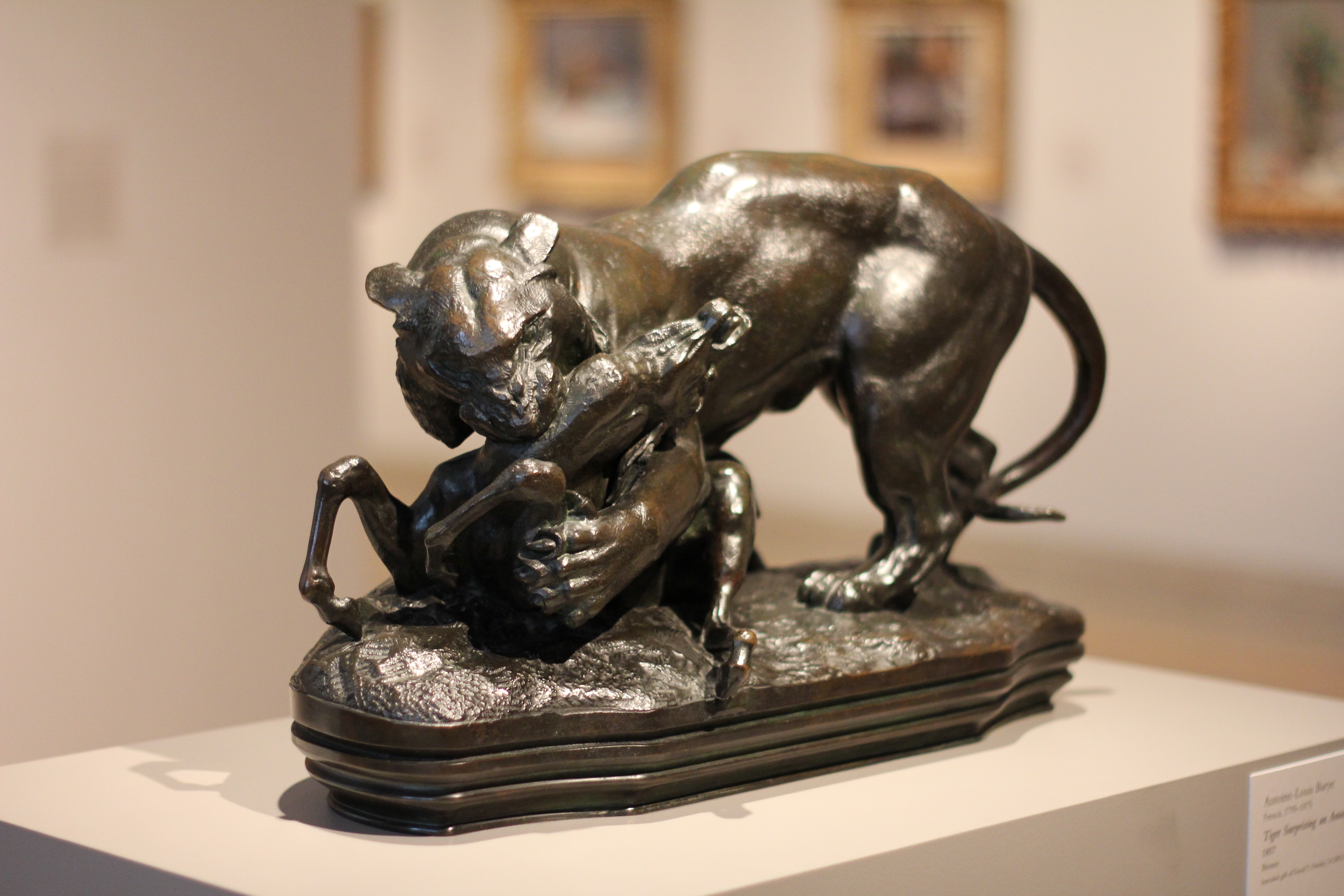
Tiger Surprising an Antelope Antoine-Louis Barye model c. 1831, cast after 1855

=== Paul Cézanne ===
The Gardener Vallier Paul Cézanne 1906

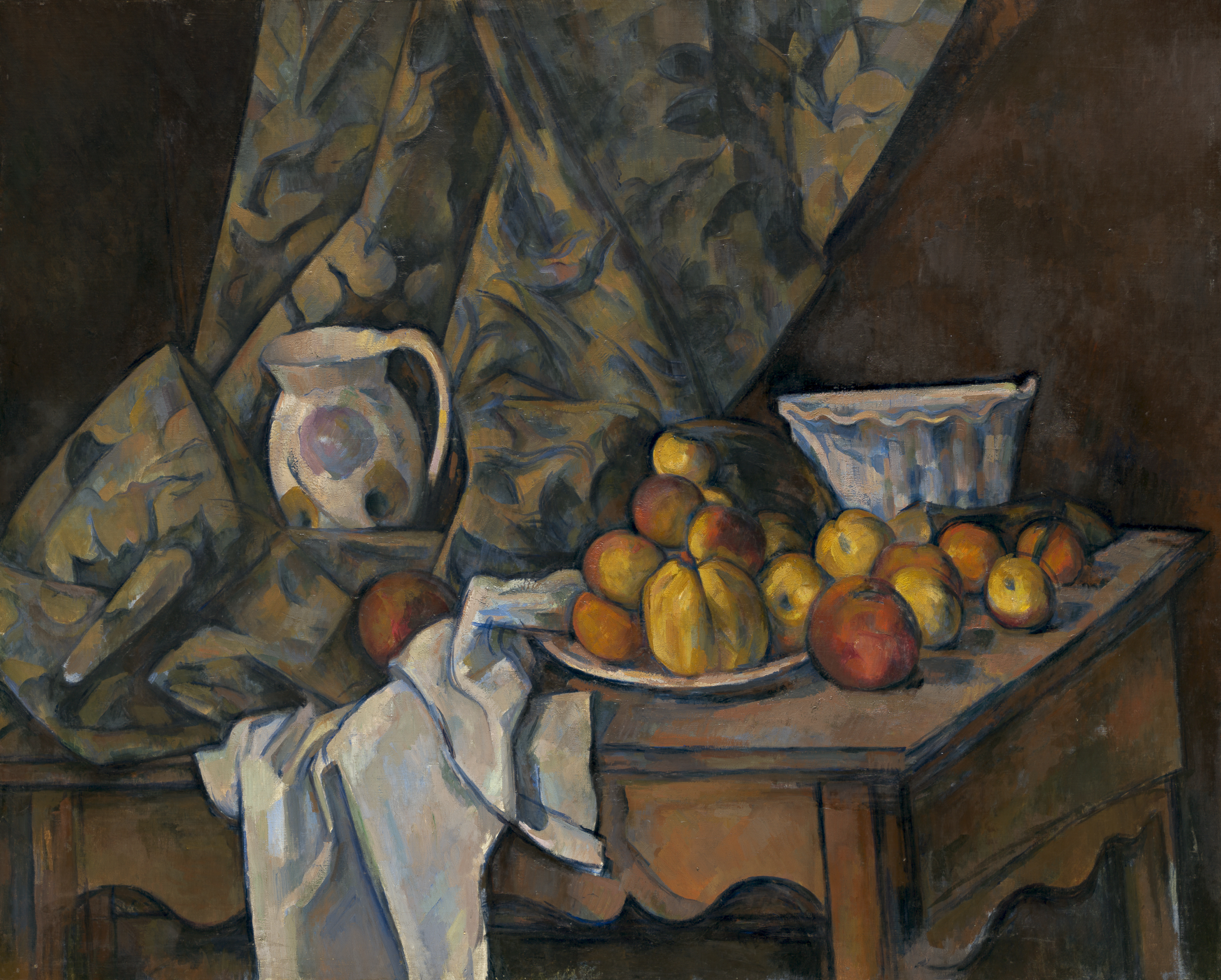
Still Life with Apples and Peaches Paul Cézanne 1905

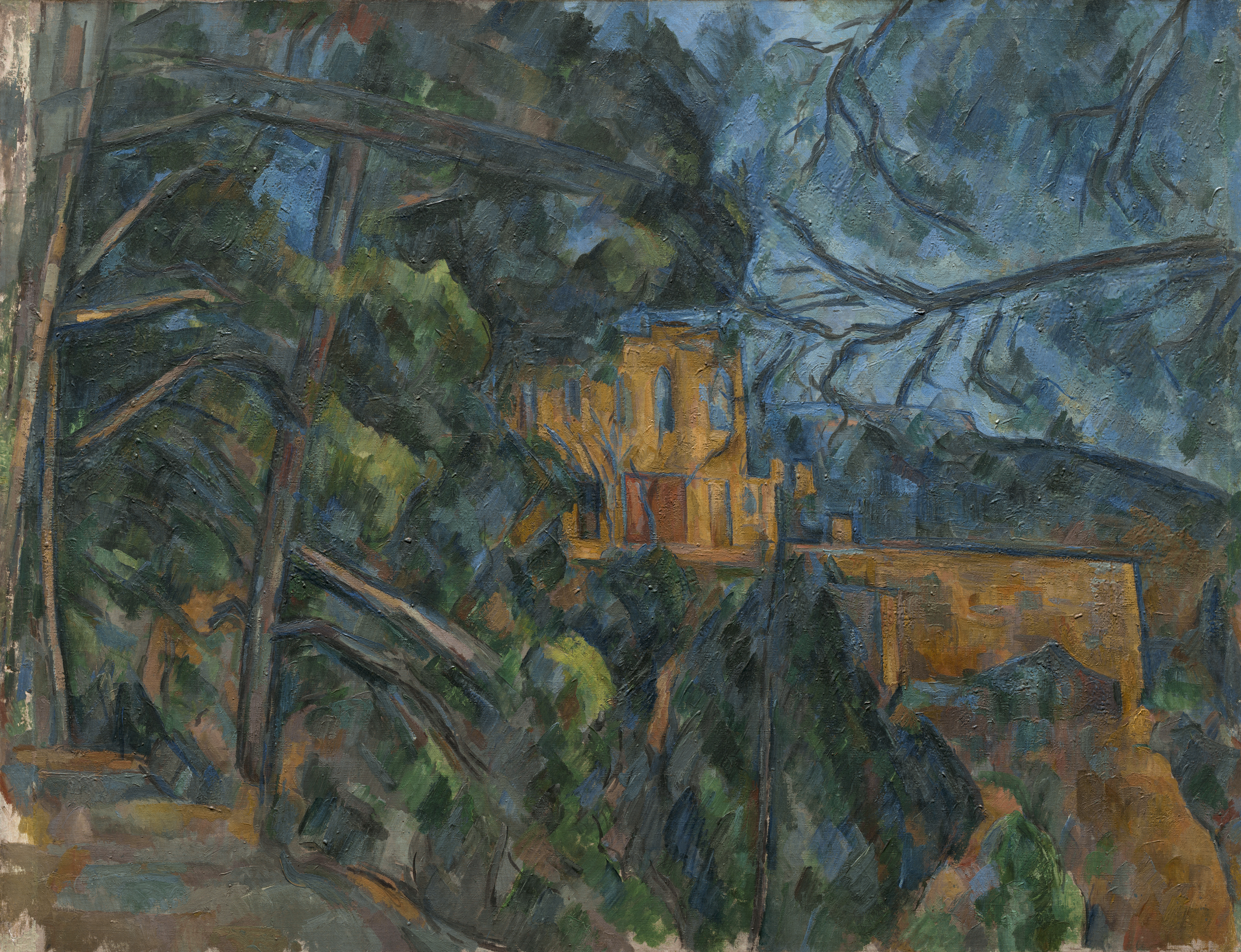
Château Noir Paul Cézanne 1900/1904

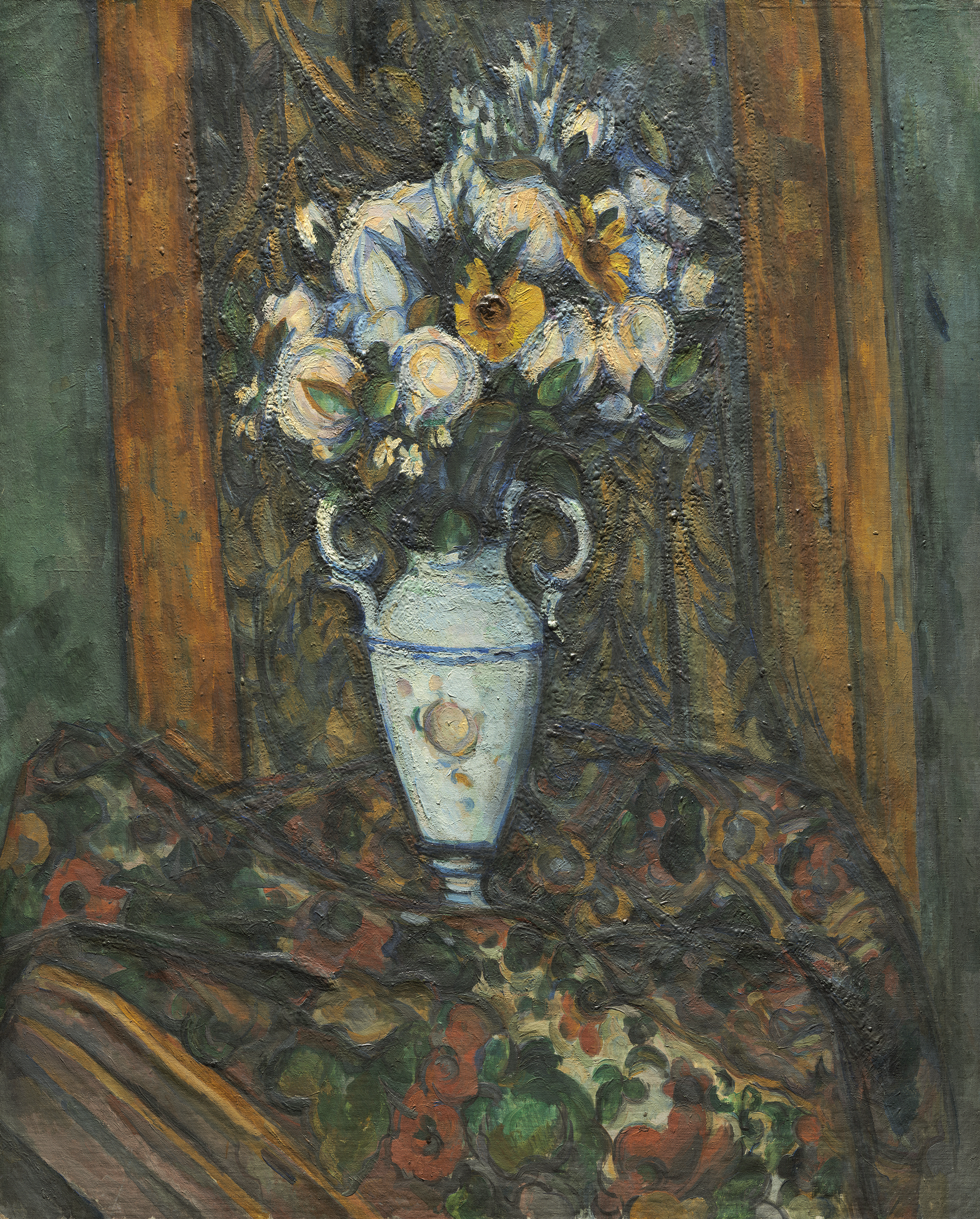
Vase of Flowers Paul Cézanne 1900/1903

=== Édouard Manet ===
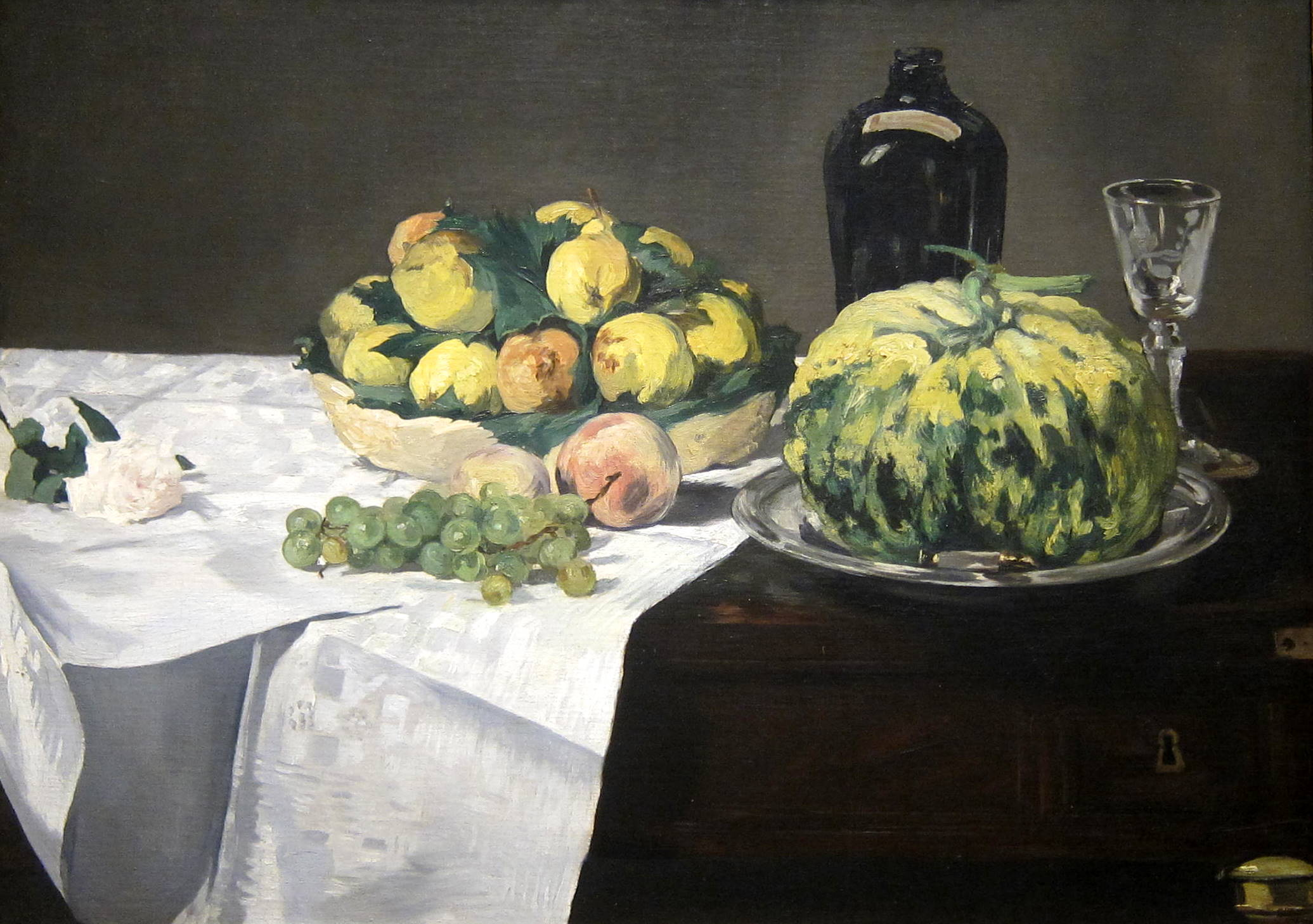
Still Life with Melon and Peaches Édouard Manet 1866

=== Pierre-Auguste Renoir ===
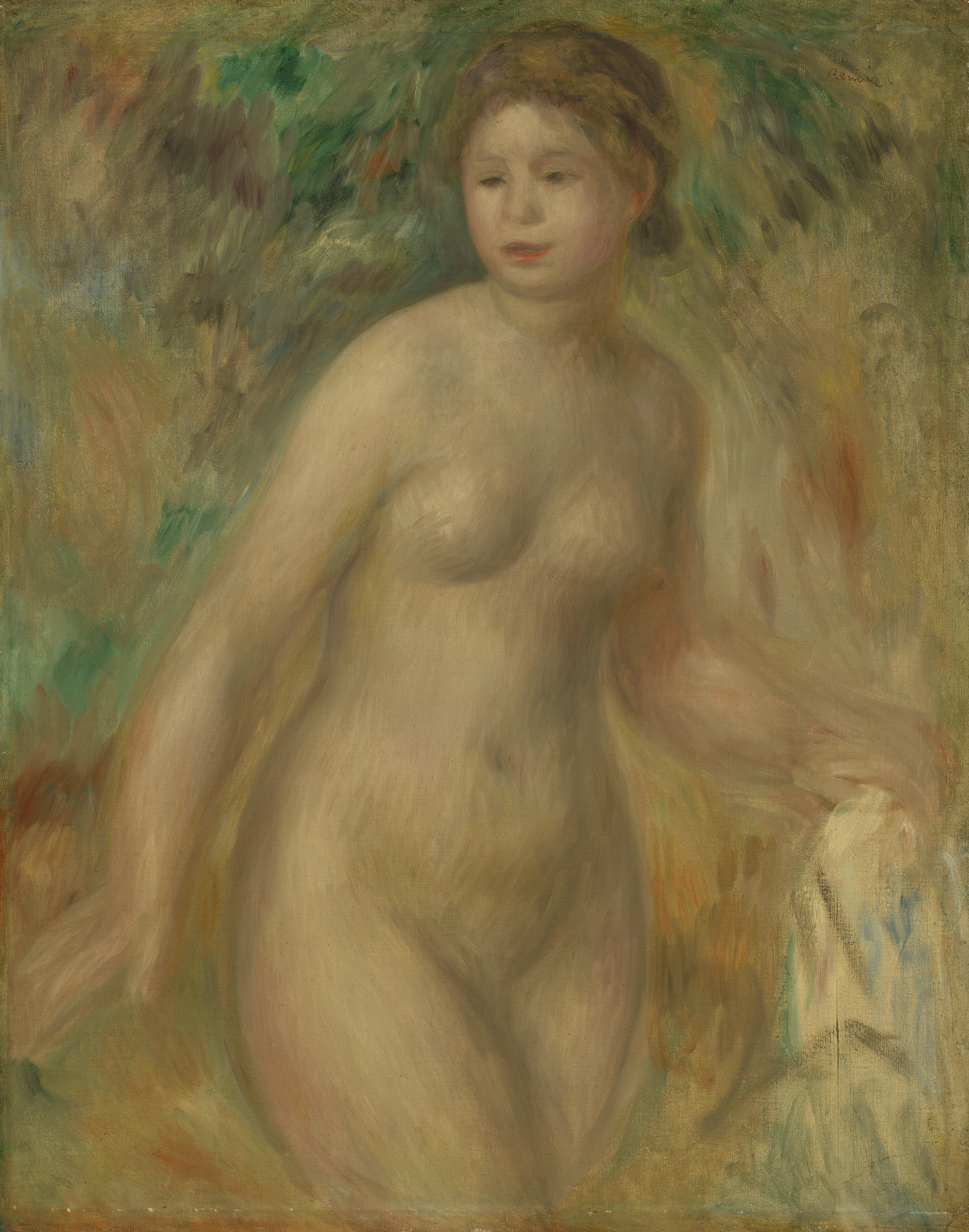
Nude Pierre-Auguste Renoir 1895

=== Auguste Rodin ===
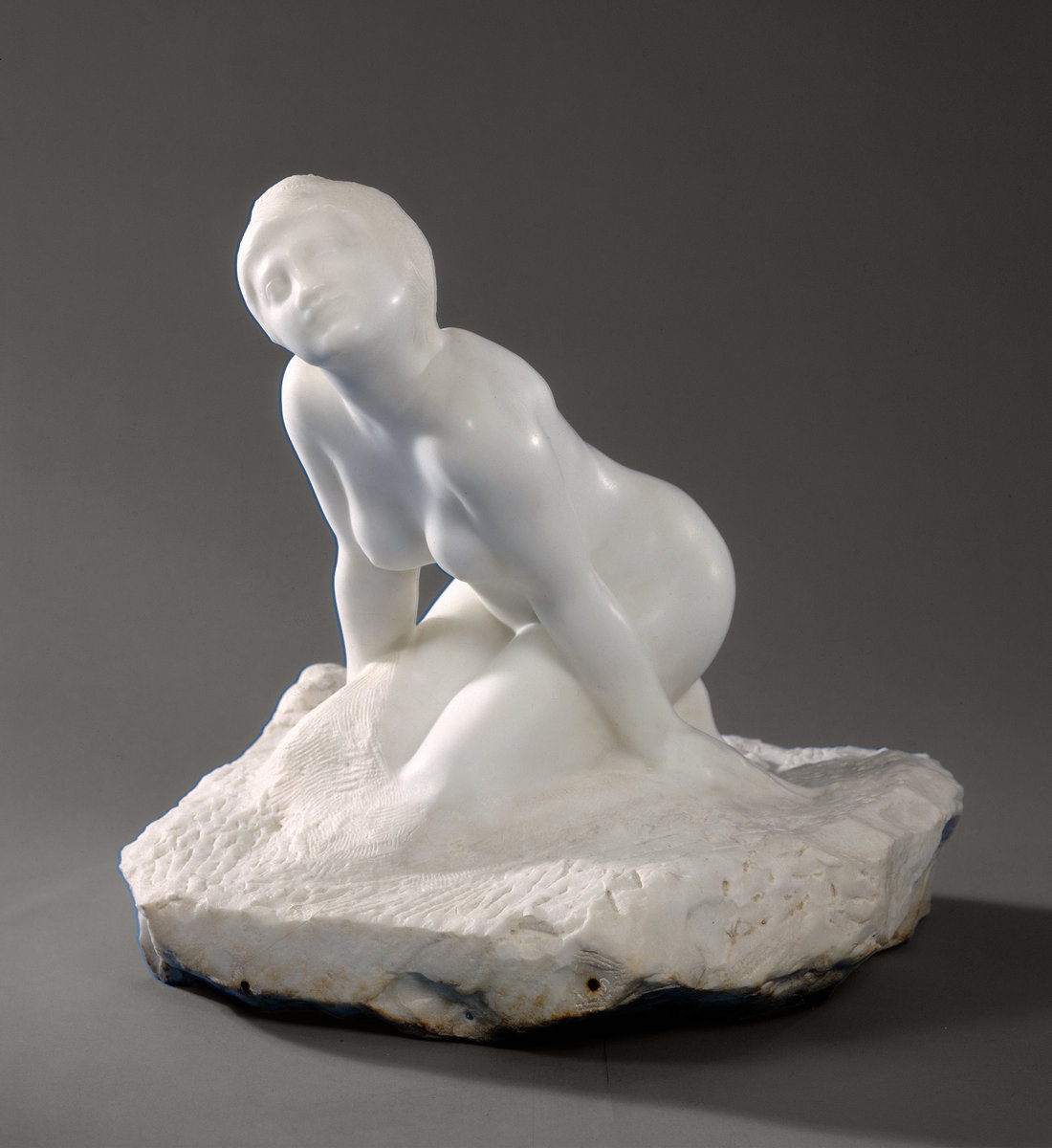
Figure of a Woman"The Sphinx" Auguste Rodin, model early 1880s, carved 1909

== Portraits of Agnes E. Meyer ==
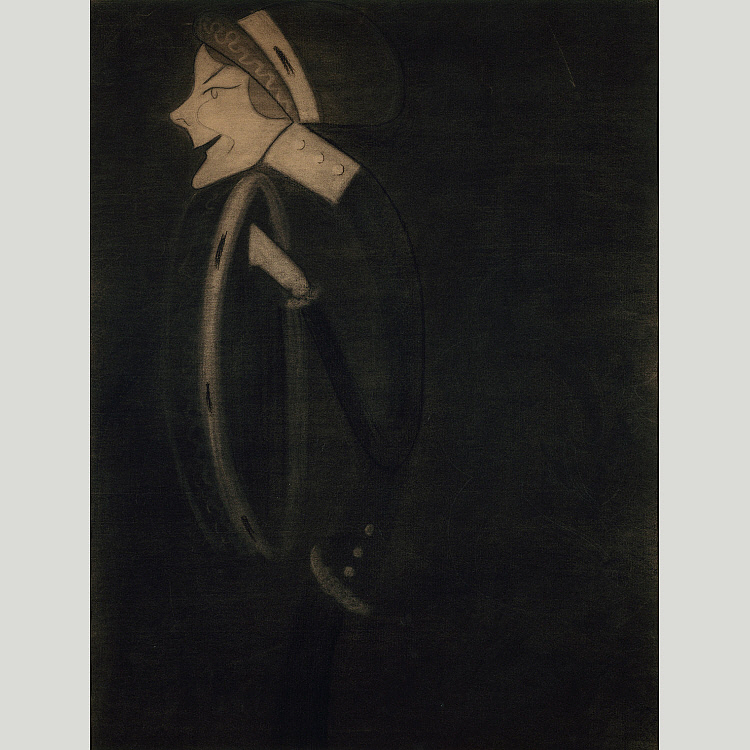
Portrait of "Agnes Meyer", Marius de Zayas, 1910

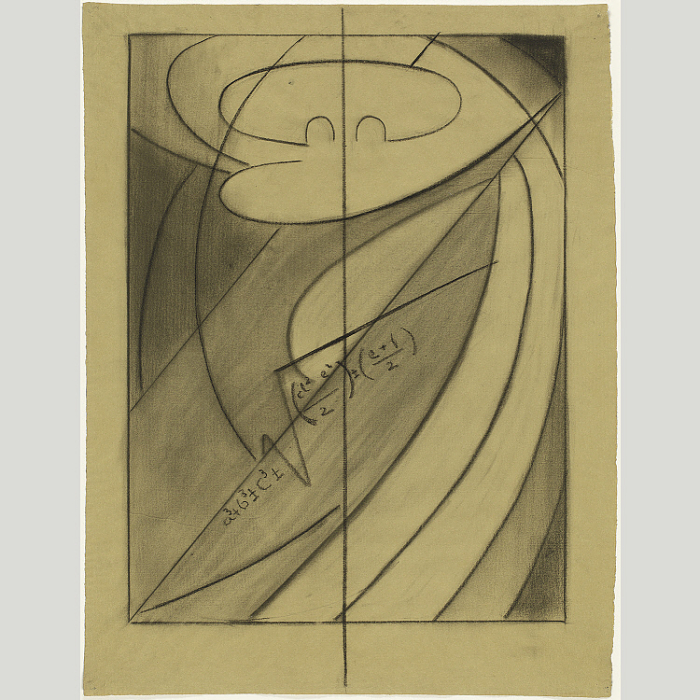
Agnes Meyer, by Marius de Zayas, 1912-13

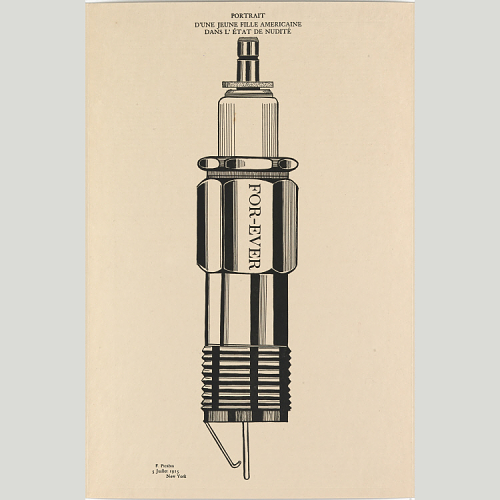
Agnes Meyer, Francis Picabia, 1915

== Other ==
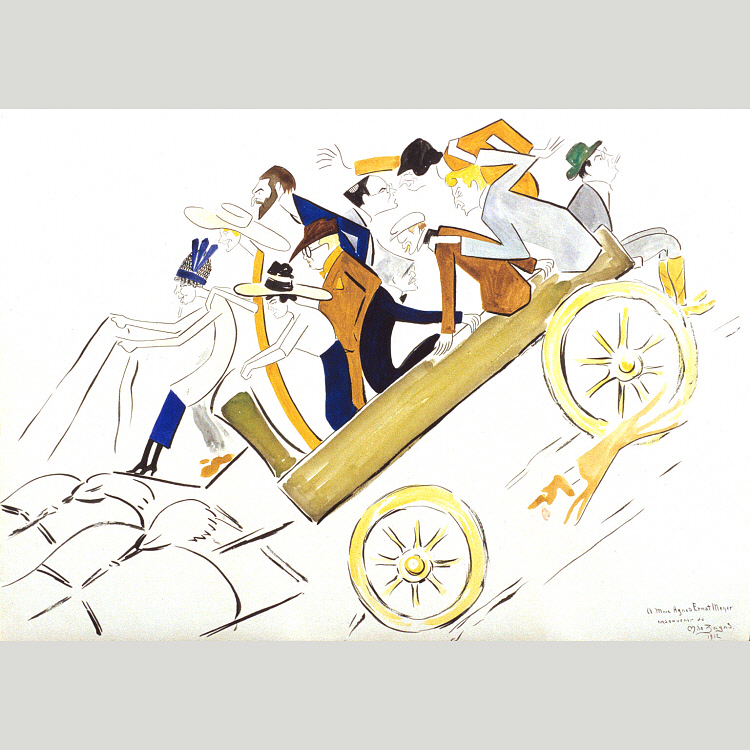
The Picnic, Marius de Zayas, 1912
