= SS Kaiser Wilhelm II =

German-built ocean liner

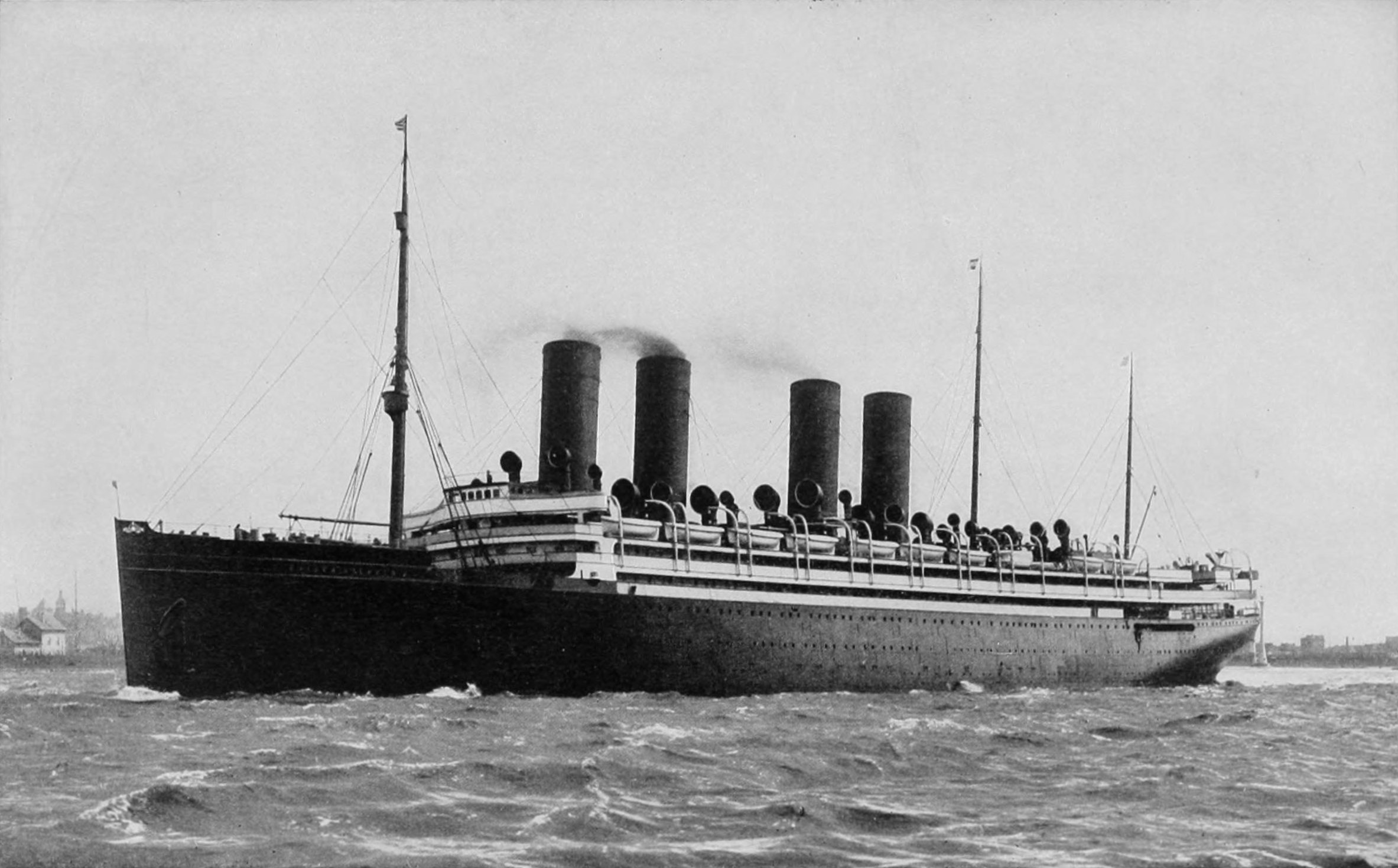
- Kaiser Wilhelm II, about 1905

History
- Name: 1902: Kaiser Wilhelm II; 1917: Agamemnon; 1927: Monticello
- Namesake: 1902: Wilhelm II; 1917: Agamemnon; 1927: Monticello
- Owner: Norddeutscher Lloyd
- Operator: 1917: United States Navy; 1927: United States Army
- Port of registry: 1903: (German Empire) Bremen
- Route: Bremen – New York
- Builder: AG Vulcan Stettin
- Yard number: 250
- Launched: 12 August 1902
- Commissioned: into US Navy, 21 August 1917
- Decommissioned: from US Navy, August 1919
- Maiden voyage: 14 April 1903
- Out of service: 1914–17, 1919–40
- Identification: 1903: code letters QHNL; by 1913: call sign DKM; 1917: Naval Registry ID-3004; 1917: code letters GQLH
- Fate: scrapped 1940

General characteristics
- Class & type: Kaiser-class ocean liner
- Tonnage: 19,361 GRT, 6,353 NRT
- Displacement: 25,530 long tons (25,940 t)
- Length: 706 ft 3 in (215.27 m) overall; 1 ft (0.30 m) registered
- Beam: 72.3 ft (22.0 m)
- Draught: 29 ft 10 in (9.1 m)
- Depth: 40.2 ft (12.3 m)
- Decks: 4
- Installed power: 4,243 NHP
- Propulsion: 2 × quadruple-expansion engines; 2 × screws
- Speed: 23.5 knots (43.5 km/h)
- Capacity: passengers: 775 × 1st class, 343 × 2nd class, 770 × 3rd class
- Complement: 962 officers & enlisted
- Sensors & processing systems: by 1906: submarine signalling
- Armament: 4 × 6 in (150 mm) guns; 2 × 1-pounder guns; 2 × Colt Lewis .30-cal. machine guns; 10 × depth charges

SS Kaiser Wilhelm II was a Norddeutscher Lloyd (NDL) Kaiser-class ocean liner. She was launched in 1902 in Stettin, Germany. In the First World War she was laid up in New York from 1914 until 1917, when the US Government seized her and renamed her USS Agamemnon. In 1919 she was decommissioned from the Navy and laid up. In 1927 she was transferred to the United States Army, who renamed her USAT Monticello. She was scrapped in 1940.

When launched, Kaiser Wilhelm II was the largest ship registered in Germany. The weight of her hull and machinery was surpassed only by the British White Star Liners RMS Cedric and Celtic. She served NDL's transatlantic route between Bremen and New York. She won the Blue Riband in 1904. Her passengers included the composers Gustav Mahler in 1910 and Jean Sibelius in 1914.

== Building ==
Kaiser Wilhelm II was launched at Stettin on 12 August 1902, in the presence of the German Emperor, for whom it was named by Miss Wiegand, daughter of Heinrich Wiegand, one of the directors of NDL. She was designed with places to mount guns, allowing her to be converted into an auxiliary cruiser for the Imperial German Navy.

She had a full double bottom. 16 transverse bulkheads and one longitudinal bulkhead divided her into 26 watertight compartments. The longitudinal bulkhead separated her two engine rooms. She was designed to remain afloat with any two compartments flooded. 52 watertight doors were distributed between the bulkheads, 24 of which could be closed from the bridge via the Dörr mechanism.

== Interiors ==
The ship had berths for 1,888 passengers: 775 in 290 cabins in First Class, 343 in 102 cabins in Second Class, and 770 in Third Class. The two First Class "Imperial" suites were the finest accommodation aboard, each having a dining room, drawing room, bedroom, and bathroom. There were eight suites with sitting room, bedroom, and bathroom; and another eight cabins with an en suite bathroom.

Johann Poppe, who had designed the interiors of Kaiser Wilhelm der Grosse and Kronprinz Wilhelm, also designed the interior of Kaiser Wilhelm II. The First Class dining saloon was three decks high and was in Poppe's signature German Baroque revival style. It was 108 feet long and 69 feet wide, the full beam of the ship. It could seat 554 diners. Other First Class amenities included a children's saloon, a typewriting room, smoking room, drawing room, reading and writing room, and two cafés on the bridge deck.

== German career ==
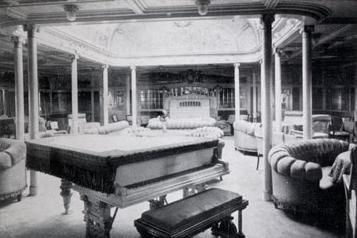
First Class Drawing Room

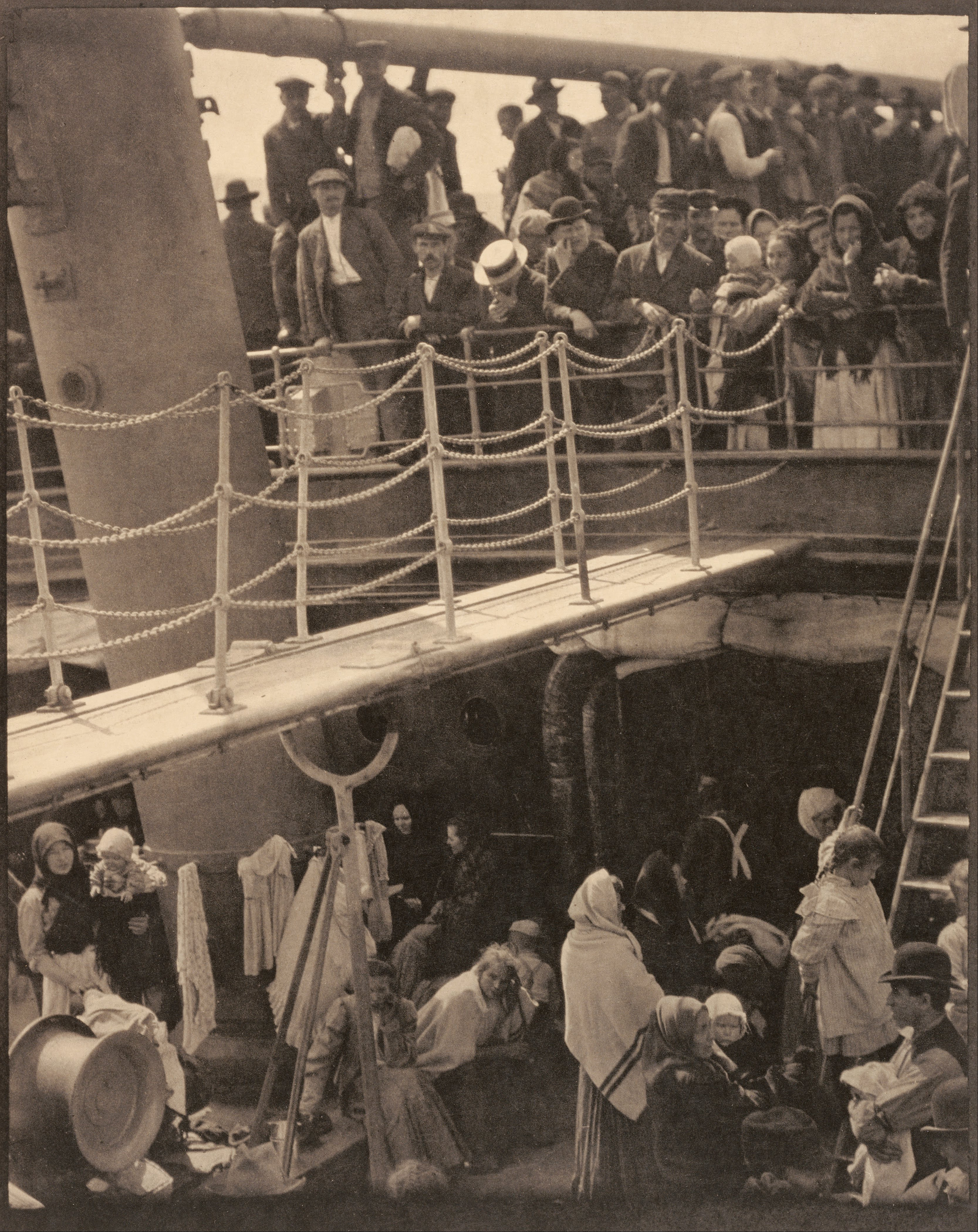
The Steerage by Alfred Stieglitz

NDL registered Kaiser Wilhelm II at Bremen. Her code letters were QHNL. She joined her sister ships on NDL's scheduled service between Bremen and New York. In 1904 she won the Blue Riband for the fastest eastbound crossing of the North Atlantic.

In 1907 Alfred Stieglitz took a photograph aboard Kaiser Wilhelm II called The Steerage. It records the crowded conditions in which steerage passengers, many of them emigrants, traveled on even the largest and most prestigious ocean liners.

In 1906 (after 7 March), in fog outside Cherbourg, Kaiser Wilhelm II was reported to have used submarine signalling to indicate her presence (Le Matin, Nouvelles en trois lignes: 'Pris dans la brume devant Cherbourg, le K.-Wilhelm-II révéla sa présence par le système nouveau de la cloche sous-marine').

On 25 February 1909 Kaiser Wilhelm II was entering New York in fog as the Hamburg America Line ship Prinz August Wilhelm was leaving. At about 07:30 hrs that morning Kaiser Wilhelm II was moving slowly in Gedney Channel when she sighted Prinz August Wilhelm ahead. Both ships took evasive action, and Kaiser Wilhelm II ran aground on a mudbank rather than hit Prinz August Wilhelm. Some of the passengers who saw the incident said that the ships cleared each other by less than 30 feet (9 m).

By 1910 the ship was equipped with wireless telegraphy. By 1913 her wireless call sign was DKM.

On 17 June 1914 Kaiser Wilhelm II collided with the 3,060 GRT British cargo steamship Incemore in thick fog off the Needles. The liner's hull was holed below the waterline, but her watertight bulkheads held and she returned to Southampton under her own power. Kaiser Wilhelm II was westbound on 3–4 August 1914 when Germany declared war on France and the United Kingdom declared war on Germany. She evaded Entente naval patrols, and reached New York two days later.

== US career ==
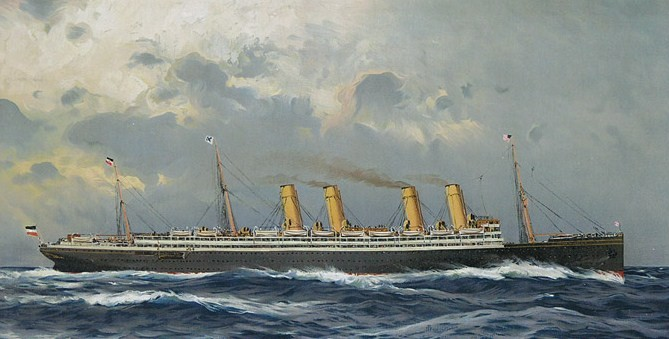
Postcard of Kaiser Wilhelm II

When the US Government declared war on Germany on 6 April 1917, it seized German ships in US-controlled ports, including Kaiser Wilhelm II. Her German crew had sabotaged her machinery, so she was repaired at Brooklyn Navy Yard, and used as a barracks ship while being repaired.

Late in August 1917 the US Navy commissioned her as USS Kaiser Wilhelm II (ID-3004). At the beginning of September she was renamed Agamemnon. At the end of October she entered service, carrying troops to France. At sea on 9 November 1917 she was damaged in a collision with another large ex-German transport, USS Von Steuben, but completed her crossing to Europe a few days later. After her return to the US in December and subsequent repairs, Agamemnon steamed to France in mid-January 1918 and thereafter regularly crossed the North Atlantic in support of the American Expeditionary Forces on the Western Front. She occasionally encountered real or suspected U-boats. In the fall of 1918 Spanish flu broke out aboard.

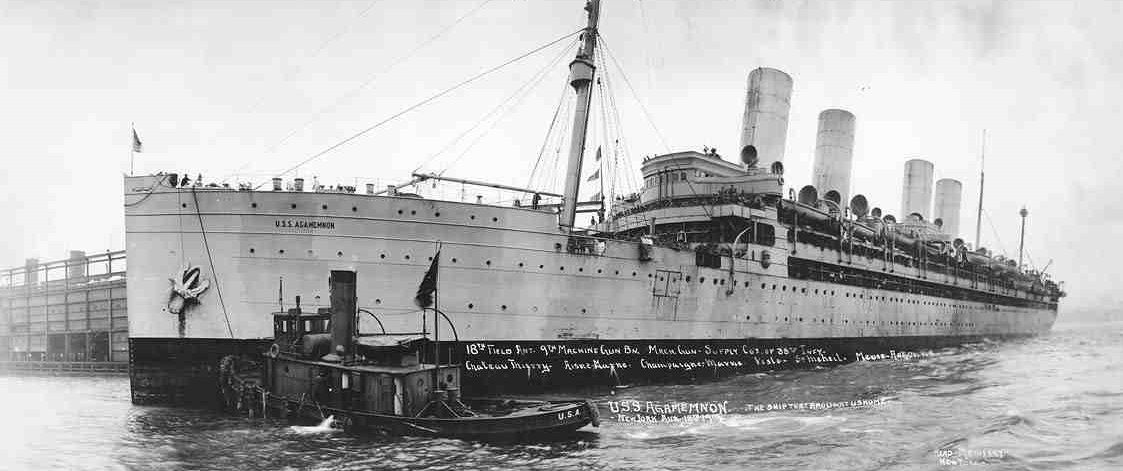
USS Agamemnon

In mid-December 1918, just over a month after the Armistice with Germany, Agamemnon began to repatriate US troops from France. She made nine voyages by August 1919, carrying nearly 42,000 service personnel, some four thousand more than she had taken overseas during the war. USS Agamemnon was decommissioned late in August and turned over to the War Department for use as a US Army Transport. She was laid up after the mid-1920s. In 1927 she was renamed Monticello, but saw no further service. She was considered too old for further use in World War II, and was sold for scrap in 1940.

Records
Preceded by Deutschland	Atlantic Eastbound Record; 1904–1907	Succeeded by Lusitania
