= George de Zayas =

- Born: 1882
- Died: 1967 (aged 84–85)
- Known for: Caricature
- Father: Rafael de Zayas Enriquez

George de Zayas (1882–1967) was a Mexican caricature artist, best known for work that appeared in Collier's, Harper's Bazaar, and the magazine section of the New York Herald Tribune.

His father, Rafael de Zayas Enriquez (1848–1932), was a noted historian, orator, and lawyer, named Poet Laureate of his country. In 1907, opposition to the dictatorship of Porfirio Diaz forced the de Zayas family to flee their homeland and settle in New York. There, George's brother, Marius de Zayas (1880–1961), became a well-known caricature artist and art dealer. At the age of 16, George left for Paris to study art, where he met some of the most important artists of the day. In 1919, he contributed eleven caricatures to the portfolio by Curnonsky, pseudonym of the French writer Maurice Edmond Sailland (1872–1956), who later became a well-known food critic. The portfolio was entitled Huit Peintres, deux sculpteurs et un musician tres modernes. The eight painters mentioned in the title were Marcel Duchamp, Albert Gleizes, Henri Matisse, Marie Laurencin, Jean Metzinger, Francis Picabia, Pablo Picasso and Georges Ribemont-Dessaignes; the sculptors Alexander Archipenko and Constantin Brâncuși; and the musician Eric Satie. It was also while living in Paris that de Zayas gave Marcel Duchamp a comet-shaped tonsure which was photographed by Man Ray, an image that has often been reproduced in the literature on this famous French artist.

De Zayas returned to the United States in 1926, where he worked for a variety of magazines on a free-lance basis. In 1933, he designed the Huey Long Medal, and in 1938, joined the Artists Guild, where, for a brief period, he served as president. He ended his career as a commercial photographer, working for many years for the International Division of RCA.
