= 291 (magazine) =

Magazine

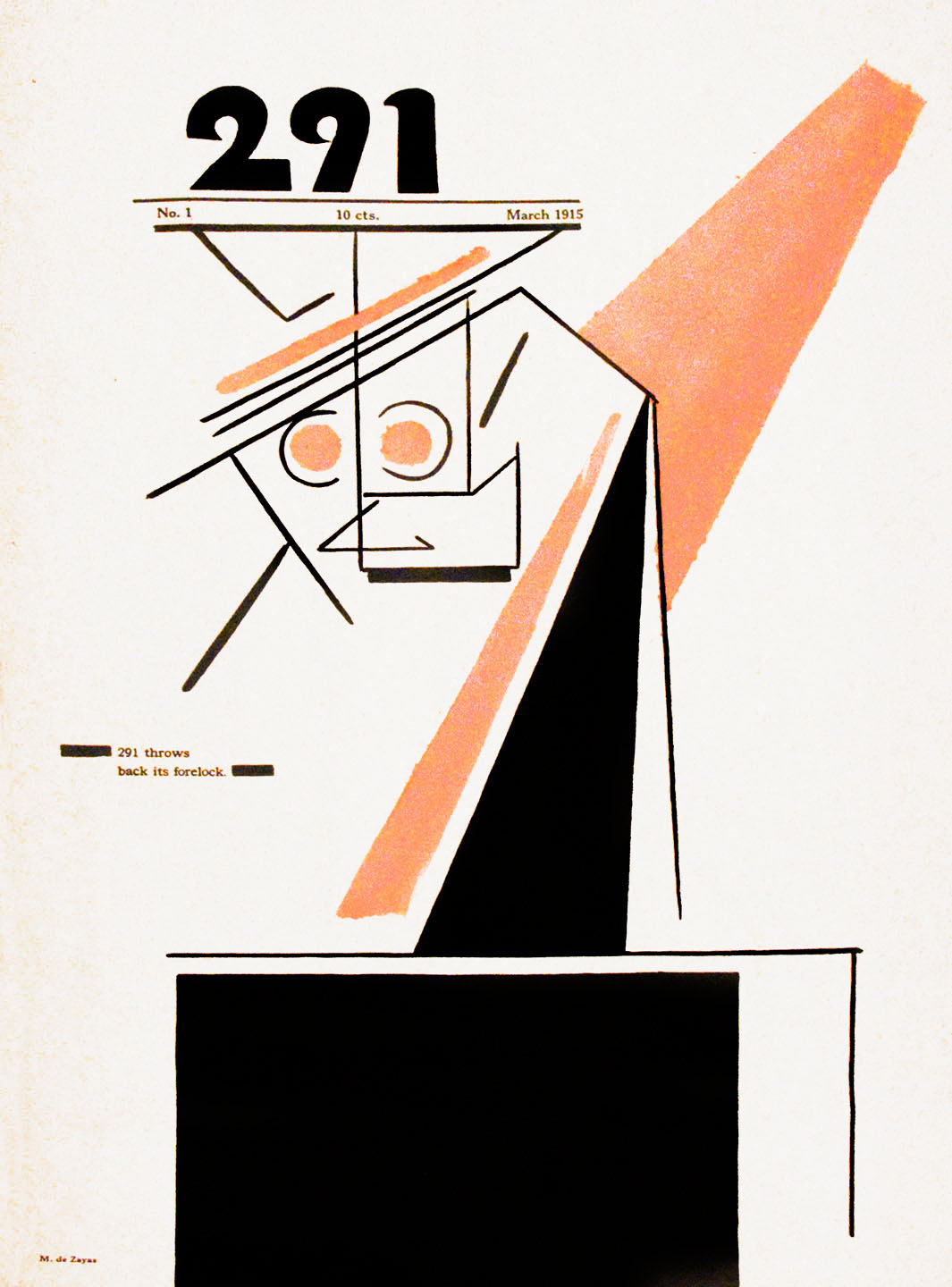
- Editor: Marius de Zayas, Paul Haviland, Agnes E. Meyer, Alfred Stieglitz
- Categories: Literature, visual arts
- Frequency: Monthly
- Publisher: Stieglitz
- First issue: 1915
- Final issue: 1916
- Country: United States
- Based in: New York City
- Language: English
- OCLC: 29656182

291 was an arts and literary magazine that was published from 1915 to 1916 in New York City. It was created and published by a group of four individuals: photographer/modern art promoter Alfred Stieglitz, artist Marius de Zayas, art collector/journalist/poet Agnes E. Meyer and photographer/critic/arts patron Paul Haviland. Initially intended as a way to bring attention to Stieglitz's gallery of the same name (291), it soon became a work of art in itself. The magazine published original art work, essays, poems and commentaries by Francis Picabia, John Marin, Max Jacob, Georges Ribemont-Dessaignes, de Zayas, Stieglitz and other avant-garde artists and writers of the time, and it is credited with being the publication that introduced visual poetry to the United States.

== Background ==
Alfred Stieglitz was one of the most active arts promoters in the world in the early 1910s. He was already famous for his own photography, he published the well-known magazine Camera Work and he ran the progressive art gallery 291 in New York. After the Armory Show in 1913, a trio of artists and supporters (de Zayas, Meyer and Haviland) gathered around Stieglitz at his gallery, encouraged by his recent interest in promoting other art forms in addition to photography. In January 1915 they proposed the idea of starting a new magazine that would showcase the most avant-garde art of Europe and the U.S., and at the same time bring attention to Stieglitz's gallery. They named the new magazine after the gallery, and with Stieglitz's blessing the four of them began working on the first issue.

Compared with his other publications, Stieglitz was fairly detached from the project. He later said, "I was more or less an onlooker, a conscious one, wishing to see what they would do so far as policy was concerned if left to themselves." Nonetheless, Stieglitz was not one to sit idly aside while something went on around him. He helped set the tone and direction of the magazine, beginning with its design and production.

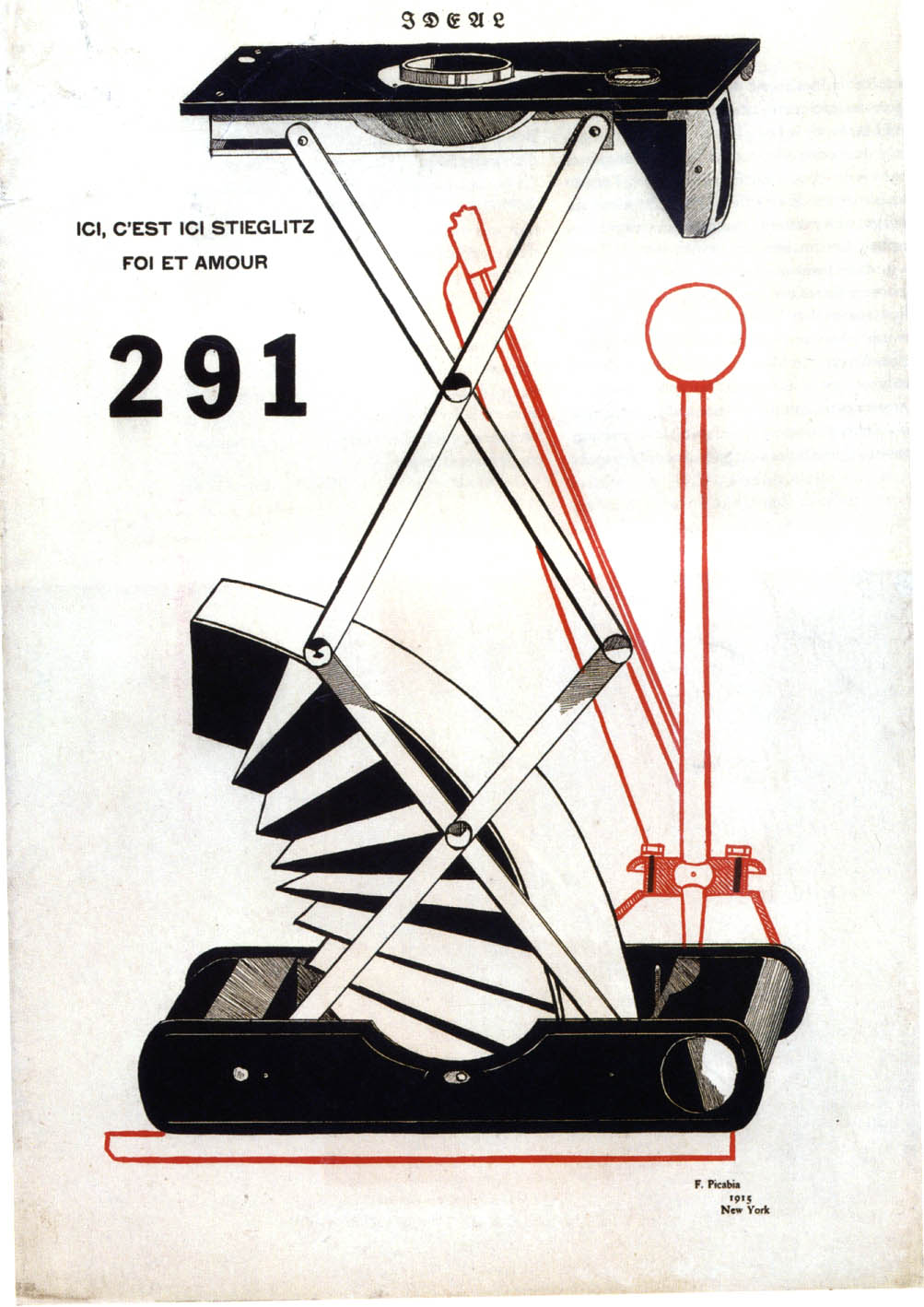
Francis Picabia, Ici, c'est ici Stieglitz, foi et amour, cover of 291, No. 1, 1915

Wanting to live up to the high standards set in Camera Work, Stieglitz and his colleagues decided to publish two editions of the magazine: a standard subscription printed on heavy white paper and a deluxe edition, limited to 100 copies, printed on Japanese vellum. Both were published in a large folio format (20" x 12"/50.8 cm x 30.5 cm).

Each issue contained just four to six pages, sometimes hinged together to provide a fold-out spread, and there were no advertisements. Due to its size and cutting edge presentation, it had the look and feel of a work of art itself, not a magazine about art. It has been called a "proto-Dadaist statement" in part because much of the content was in the form of visual poetry, a literary and design format attributed to Picabia's friend the French surrealist Guillaume Apollinaire. The design and layout was inspired by the second series of the magazine Les Soirées de Paris, edited in France by Apollinaire, and it was de Zayas who brought the concepts from the French magazine and put them into place in the new magazine. Because of these influences art historian William Innes Homer has said "In design and content, there was no periodical in America more advanced than 291.

A regular subscription initially cost ten cents per issue or one dollar a year; the deluxe edition cost five times as much. Little attempt was made to attract subscribers, and no more than one hundred signed up for the regular edition. There were only eight known subscribers to the deluxe edition.

Stieglitz had 500 extra copies printed of Issue No. 7–8, which featured his photograph The Steerage. Because it had recently been published for the first time and attracted very positive comments, he anticipated a huge demand for the image. The demand did not materialize, and none of the additional copies was sold.

Only twelve numbers of 291 were published, but three of them were double numbers so just nine actual issues were printed. It never attracted a wide audience, and the high costs of production became too much to sustain. Stieglitz had hundreds of unsold copies at his gallery when he closed it in 1917; he sold all of them to a rag picker for $5.80. In 1917, Francis Picabia founded the magazine 391 in Barcelona, the title inspired by 291.

All issues are highly valued now, and a complete set of the original issues is very rare. One of the complete sets is in the collection of the U.S. Library of Congress in Washington, DC (LC Control No 00204566). A bound reprint edition was published by the Arno Press in 1972 (ISSN 1054-7193) and may be found in large university and public libraries.

== Issues and content ==
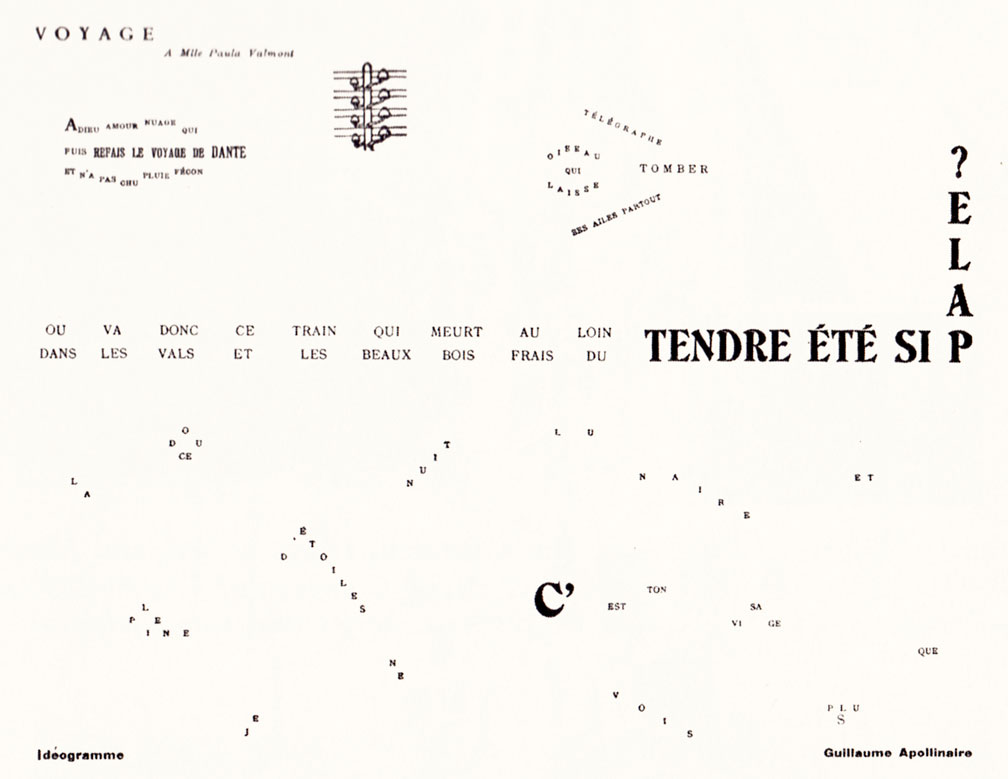
Voyage by Guillaume Apollinaire (published in 291, No. 1, 1915)

=== No. 1, March 1915 ===
- Cover: 291 Throws Back Its Forelock by Marius de Zayas
- Page 2: How Versus Why, essay by Agnes E. Meyer
- Page 3: Voyage, calligram by Guillaume Apollinaire; One Hour's Sleep – Three Dreams, text by Alfred Stieglitz
- Page 4: 291, text by Paul B. Haviland
- Page 5: Oil and Vinegar Castor, drawing by Picasso; Simultanism, essay by Marius de Zayas
- Back cover: What is Rotten in the State of Denmark, drawing by Edward Steichen

Issue No. 1 set the tone for the magazine through de Zayas' cover art, a semi-abstract, geometric drawing of a human figure entitled 291 throws back its forelock. It suggests a personification of Stieglitz's gallery while at the same time implying that the magazine was conceived by its editors as both a work of art and of dedicated satire of art.
The issue also introduced several terms that were central to the thinking that went into the concept of the publication, including simultanism, sincerism, unilaterals, satirism and satyrism. In an unsigned note entitled "Simultanism", de Zayas presented the following statement of meaning:

The idea of Simultanism is expressed in painting by simultaneous representation of different figure of a form seen from different points of view, as Picasso and Braque did some time ago; or by the simultaneous representation of the figure of several forms as the Futurists are doing.

In literature the idea is expressed by the polyphony of simultaneous voices which say different things. Of course, printing is not an adequate medium, for succession in the medium is unavoidable and a photograph is more suitable.

That the idea of simultanism is essentially naturalistic is obvious; that the polyphony of interwoven sounds and meaning has a decided effect upon our senses is unquestionable, and that we can get at the spirit of things through this system is demonstrable.

This text served as the magazine's manifesto, and it paid homage to the artist who was the primary influence in the design and presentation of the publication, Apollinaire. As if to confirm this influence, Apollinaire's calligram "Voyage" was included in the center of a triptych which formed by opening the six hinged pages of the issue.
The terms "visual poetry" and "calligram" had not yet been coined, and de Zayas later referred to the typographically designed writing in 291 as "Psychotypes", which he defined as "art which consists in making the typographical characters participate in the expression of the thoughts and in the painting of the state of the soul, no more a conventional symbols but as signs having significance in themselves". De Zayas is reported to have taken both the term and its definition from an earlier work by Amédée Ozenfant.
Below the poem is Stieglitz's account of three of his own dreams. This was the first and only article in 291 to deal with the human subconscious, and as such it is a precursor to the surrealist explorations that would begin several years later.

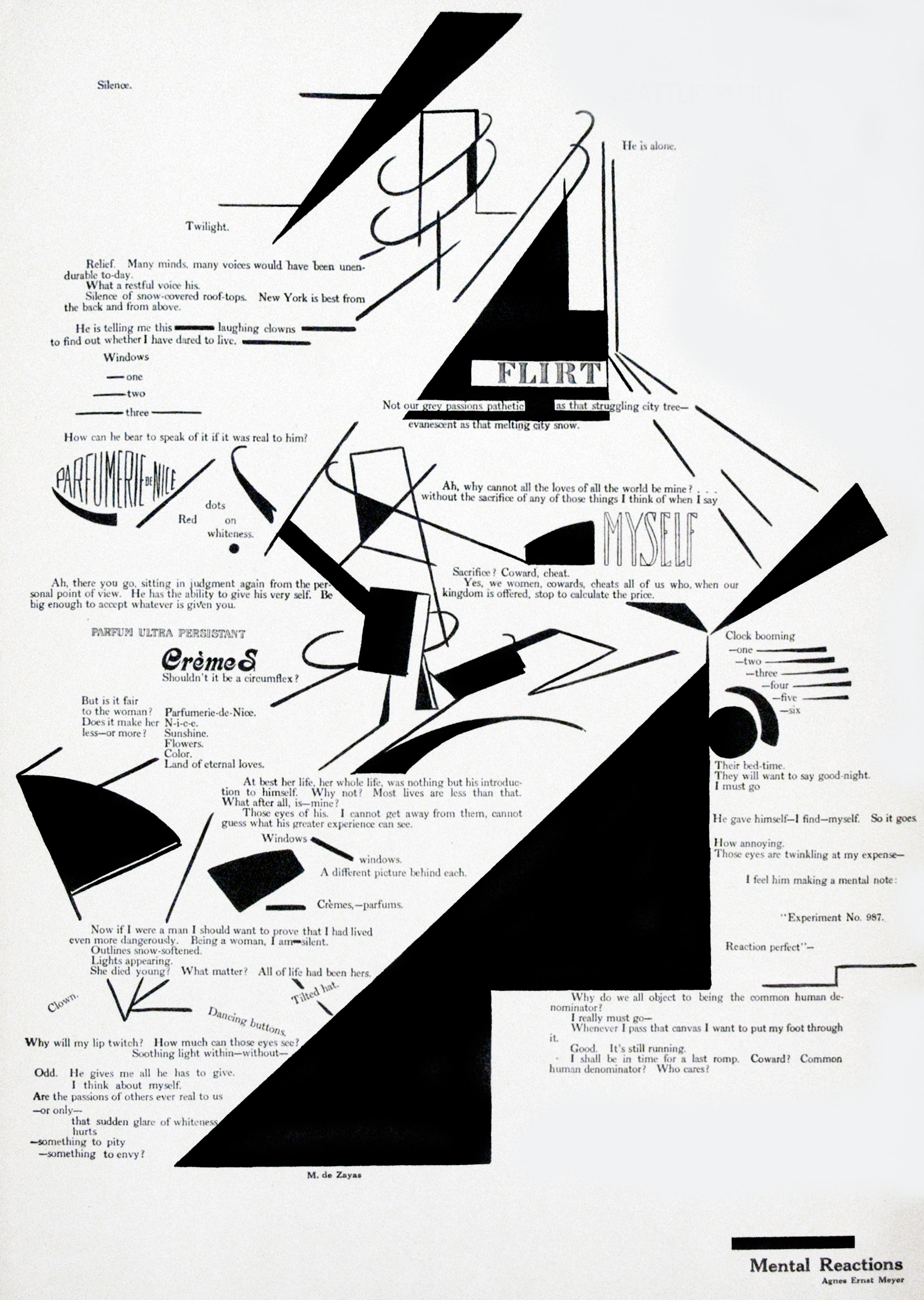
"Mental Reactions", poem by Agnes Ernst Meyer; design by Marius de Zayas (published in 291, No. 2, 1915)

=== No. 2, April 1915 ===
- Cover: New York, drawing by Francis Picabia
- Page 2: Drawing, art work by Katharine Rhoades
- Page 3: "Mental Reactions", poem by Agnes E. Meyer; designed by Marius de Zayas
- Back Cover: Bellovées Fatales No. 12, music by Alberto Savinio

This issue is notable for the striking full-page visual poem written by Agnes Meyer and visually interpreted by Marius de Zayas. This piece is generally recognized as the earliest example of visual poetry done by artists in America. It is also the first in a series of poems in 291 authored by women and presented with what were then distinctly feminine viewpoints. The significance of this artwork lies in the integration of the visual and verbal elements. The words move down the page roughly in two columns, but the geometric shapes intersect the words and create spatial dislocation. This is the very embodiment of simultanism as defined by Zayas, since the somewhat random nature of the thoughts are interpenetrated by an internal logic and rhythm.
The cover features a black-and-white drawing of New York buildings by Picabia surrounded by a seemingly random collection of "tiny articles" about art, music, and news items. Small pieces like these occur in several later issues, and it is clear they are intended to be artistic messages in the same vein as the visual art work. The second page of this issue featured a stark geometric drawing by Katherine Rhoades, while the back cover filled with Savinio's musical concept of sincerism.

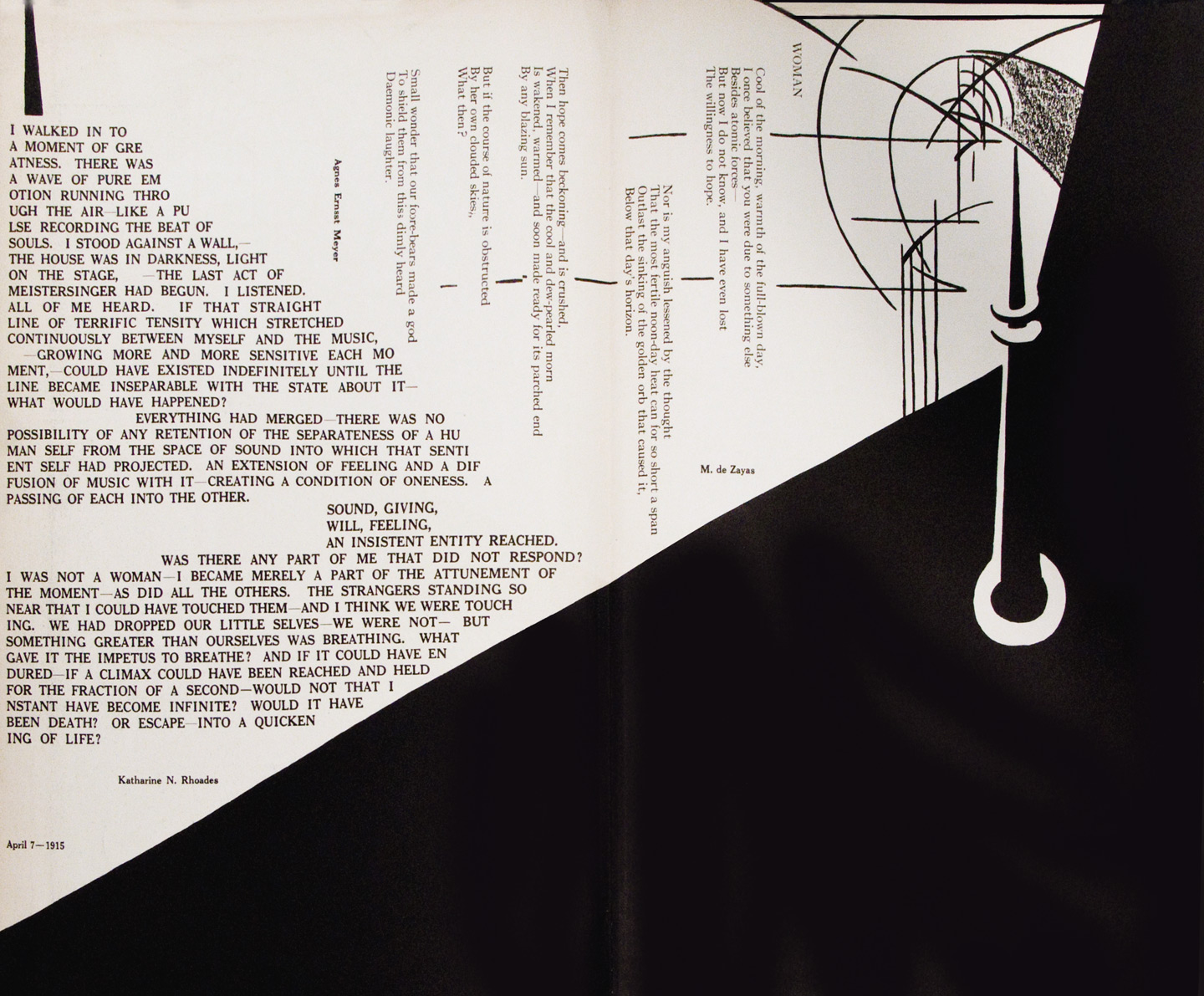
Poems by Katharine Rhoades and Agnes Ernst Meyer; design by Marius de Zayas (published in 291, No. 3, 1915)

=== No. 3, May 1915 ===
- Cover: design by A. Walkowitz
- Page 2: I Walked into a Moment of Greatness, poem by Katharine Rhoades
- Page 3: Woman, poem by Agnes E. Meyer design by Marius de Zayas
- Page 4: Le Coq Gaulois, drawing by Edward Steichen; A Bunch of Keys, visual poem by J.B. Kerfoot; plus several short texts

The cover for this issue is a dramatic black-and-white design by Abraham Walkowitz that presaged Jackson Pollock's techniques of the 1940s. The magazine opens to a two-page spread designed by de Zayas that incorporated poems by Rhoades and Meyer. It is one of the most forceful designs of any issue, in part because the lower right diagonal of the spread is nothing but black ink, but the interplay between the verbal and visual elements was not as compelling as in "Mental Reactions".
The back cover featured a simple drawing by Steichen; the visual poem A Bunch of Keys by literary critic John Barrett Kerfoot; and several small articles similar to those found on the cover of issue No 2.

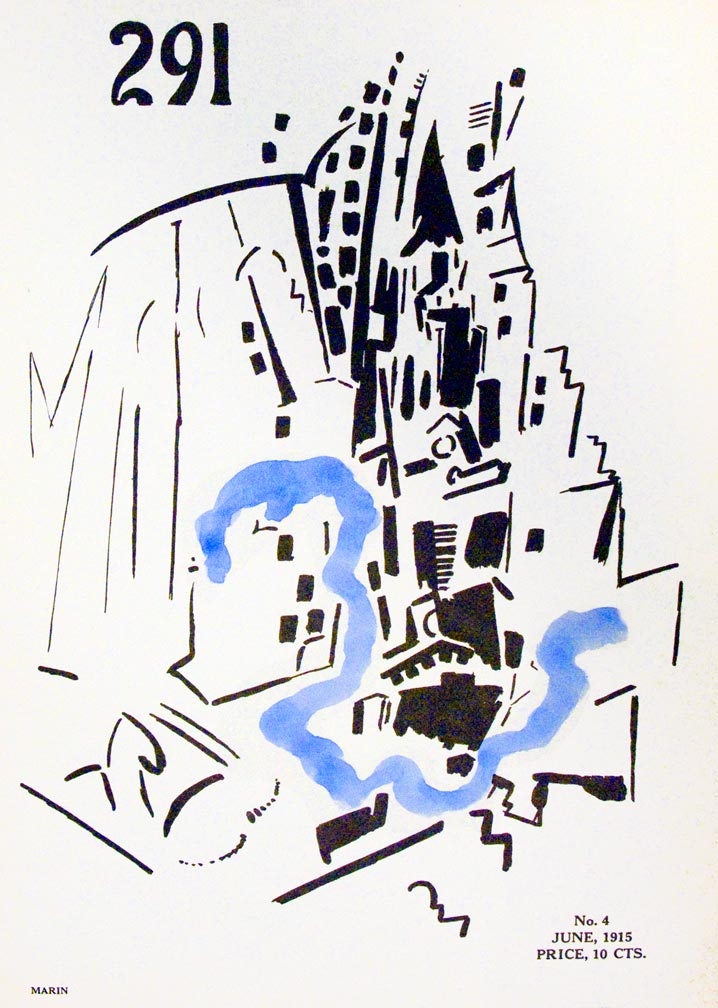
Cover of 291, No. 4, 1915; art by John Marin

=== No. 4, June 1915 ===
- Cover: design by John Marin
- Page 2: Fille Née Sans Mère, drawing by Francis Picabia
- Page 3: Flip-Flap, by Katherine Rhoades
- Back cover: Dammi L'anatema, Cosa Lasciva, essay by Alberto Savinio

The cover for this issue is filled with one of Marin's New York skyscraper drawings, a "nervous calligraphy, combined with a disintegration of forms", suggesting the artist's "romantic attitudes toward an urban environment wrought by technology". It is accented by a hand-colored blue swash that both segments and connects the buildings and streets, as if to suggest a river of life running through the geometric angles of the city. On page 2, the reverse of the cover, is Picabia's black-and-white drawing that may be seen as the reverse dimension of Marin's cityscape. It has been described as having "anti-art proportions" because of its simple lines that play off of and counteract the harder edges seen on the cover.
Katharine Rhodes' poem on page 3 "reveals both her distance from and her proximity to Dada" by being about laughter without provoking it. By placing the poem next to Picabia's drawing the editors created this same tension by provoking an artistic response to the drawing while denying a similar response in the poem.
The back cover was filled with Savinio's essay on music and art, in French.

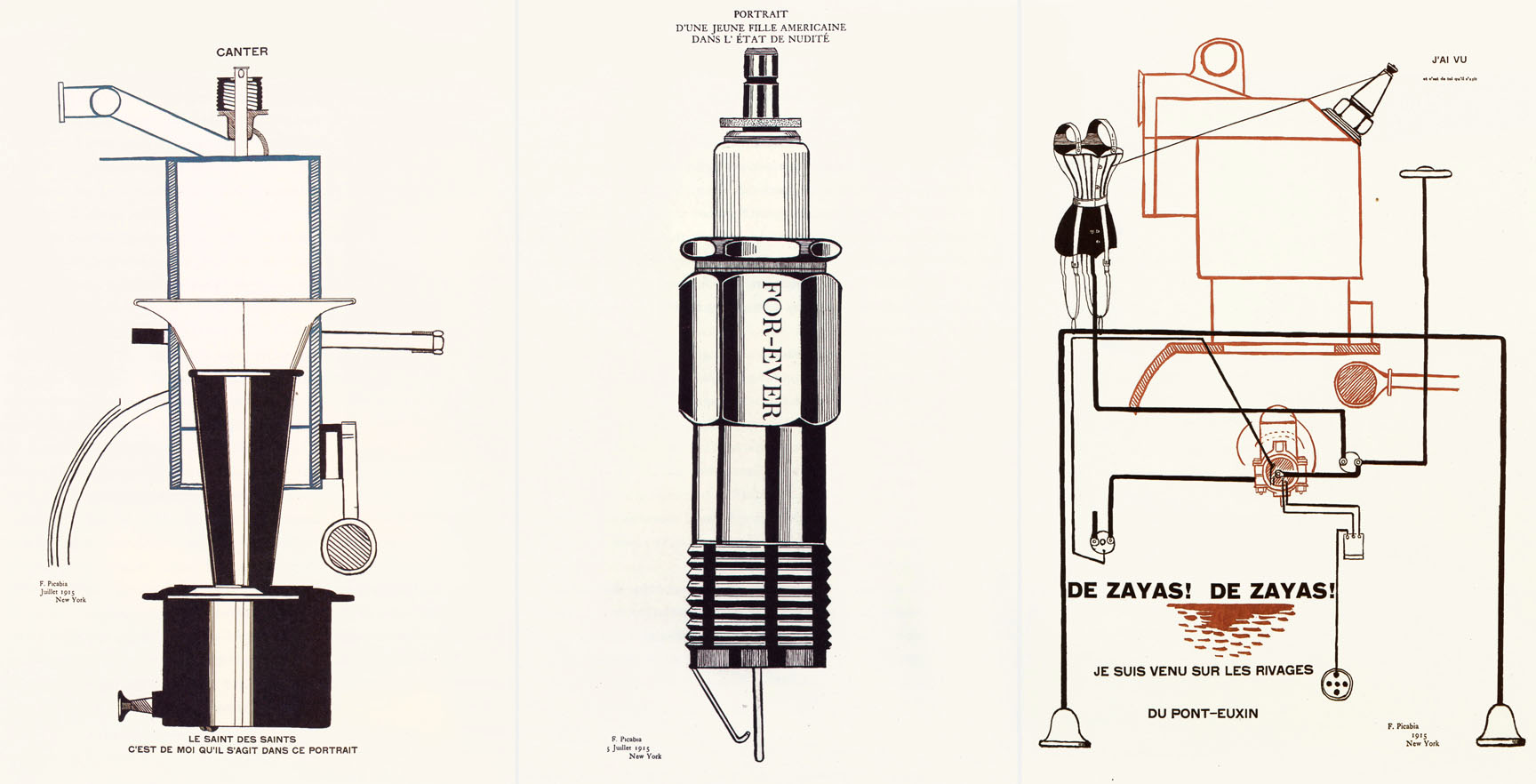
Canter, Portrait d'une Jeune Fille Américaine dans l'État de Nudité, and J'ai Vu, drawings by Francis Picabia; 291, No. 5–6, pp. 2–4, 1915

=== Nos. 5–6, July–August 1915 ===
- Cover: Ici, C'est Ici Stieglitz, Foi et Amour, drawing by Francis Picabia
- Page 2: Canter, drawing by Francis Picabia
- Page 3: Portrait d'une Jeune Fille Américaine dans l'État de Nudité, drawing by Francis Picabia
- Page 4: De Zayas! De Zayas!, drawing by Francis Picabia
- Page 5: Voila Haviland, drawing by Francis Picabia
- Page 6: New York n'a pas Vu D'abord, drawing by Marius de Zayas

This issue is a visual salute by Picabia to the protagonists of the magazine, beginning with a "portrait" of Stieglitz as a camera/car on the cover. Inside are metaphorical depictions of Picabia, de Zayas and Haviland, all seen as some form of automobile/machine. These four images flank a centerpiece called Portrait d'une Jeune Fille Américaine dans l'État de Nudité (Portrait of a Young American Girl in a State of Nudity), which is a relatively straightforward drawing of a spark plug with the words "For-Ever" on its side. Unlike the other pieces there is no indication of whom the artist intended to portray in this piece, although at least one critic believes it is a portrait of Agnes Meyer and thus completes the team of "drivers" behind the magazine.
Some critics have interpreted these images as filled with sexual and phallic imagery, yet others have seen in them "symbols extracted from mechanical devices", filled with "faith in its divine power to reveal life, to spur action, to excite creative impulse..."

=== Nos. 7–8, September–October 1915 ===
- Cover: Comments on The Steerage by Paul Haviland and Marius de Zayas
- Interior insert The Steerage, photograph by Alfred Stieglitz
- Back cover: the same comments on the cover, translated into French

This is the only issue in which a photograph was published, a single large gravure of Stieglitz's The Steerage inserted inside. The image is introduced on the cover by brief rhetorical commentaries by Haviland and de Zayas that continue Picabia's mechanistic imagery from the previous issue in a verbal form. Haviland begins with:

We are living the age of the machine. Man made the machine in his own image. She has limbs which act; lungs which breather; a heart which beats; a nervous system through runs electricity. The photograph is the image of his voice; the camera the image of his eye. The machine is his 'daughter born without a mother.' That is why he loves her. He has made the machine superior to himself. That is why he admires her. Having made her superior to himself, he endows the superior beings which he conceives in his poetry and in his plastique with the qualities of machines..Man gave her every qualification except thought. She submits to his will but he must direct her activities. Without him she remains a wonderful being, but without aim or anatomy. Through their mating they complete one another. She bring forth according to his conceptions.

De Zayas continues this imagery with:

A group on men in France has flooded our inner world with the light of a new plastic expression. Stieglitz, in America through photography, has shown us, as far as possible, the objectivity of our outer world.

I speak of that photography in which the genius of man leaves to the machine its full power of expression. For it is only thus that we can reach a comprehension of pure objectivity.

Objective truth takes precedence over Stieglitz in his work. By means of a machine he shows us the outer life.

The back cover is a French translation of the front cover. There is nothing else in the issue.

=== No. 9, November 1915 ===
- Cover: Untitled (Still Life), drawing by Braque
- Page 2: Femme! (Elle), typographic layout by Marius de Zayas
- Page 3: Voilà Elle, drawing by Francis Picabia
- Back cover: Violin, drawing by Picasso

The front and back covers were reproductions of art works that had been exhibited at the 291 gallery in January of that year. Both pieces are Cubist variations on a violin.
Inside was the visual poem Femme (Elle) by de Zayas and Picabia's machine drawing Voilà Elle, starkly opposing and complementing each other at the same time. Literature professor Dickran Tashjian suggests that "the woman of the poem and the woman of the machine drawings are one and the same...The juxtaposition of the poem and the drawing...leads the viewer into a mechanistic universe where correspondences between the feminine ideal and the mindless machine are overwhelming. Just as the machine ironically undercuts the ideal, the entire mechanomorphic mythology derives its power from an inhuman eroticism. The circle is completed as one feeds upon the other."
A contemporary critic reported that "according to the artists' sworn word these works were portraits of the same woman made at different times and in different places without collusion." However, it has been argued that if the two artists did not collaborate then de Zayas must have modeled his composition on that of Picabia.

=== Nos. 10–11, December 1915 – January 1916 ===
- Cover: untitled collage by Picasso
- Page 2: Picasso, drawing by Marius de Zayas
- Page 3: Fantasie, drawing by Francis Picabia; *Musique, poem by Georges Ribemont-Dessaignes
- Back cover: La Vie Artistique, essay by C. Max Jacob

The inclusion of both Braque and Picasso in this issue signaled a "dispersion of 291 into non-Dada avant-garde concerns." By this time it was clear to the editors that 291 was not sustainable financially, and they appeared to be running out of energy. While Picasso and Braque were still controversial, the reproduction of their art was straightforward and lacking in any dynamic connection to the rest of the contents. Picabia's drawing, subtitled "L'Homme créa Die à son image" (Man created God in his own image), suggested Dadaist shock tactics in its Biblical inversion of the phrase, but its simple lines failed to create any similar visual encounter.

=== No. 12, February 1916 ===
Adelheid Lange Roosevelt, 1915, Tennis Player Serving

- Cover: photograph of an Ogouée-Congo Sculpture
- Page 2: Narcosis, poem by Katharine Rhoades; "Modern Art...Negro Art...", essay by Marius de Zayas
- Page 3: We Live in a World..., commentary by Picabia; Tennis Player – Serving, photograph of a sculpture by Mrs. A. Roosevelt
- Back cover: La Vie Artistique, essay by C. Max Jacob

The twelfth and final issue of 291 either ended things on a fairly optimistic note or continued the ironic expression of its Dadaist roots, depending upon how one chooses to read it. It is anchored by two short essays by de Zayas and Picabia. The former discussed African art and its influences on Picasso, while Picabia waxed poetic about the nature of art. He ended his short essay by saying "I maintain...that the painting of today is the most truthful and purest expression of our modern life." Critics are unresolved about his intent in this statement; some see it as simple appreciation of his fellow artists, while others view it as yet another Dadaist comment deriding the current artistic scene. Given that the cover of the issue was an African mask (shown at the "Negro Art Exhibition" at 291 in 1914), it would have been in keeping with the editors' initial spirit for Picabia's comment to have been an ironic statement viewed in juxtaposition to the "primitive" art of the mask.
Below Picabia's comments is a photo of a sculpture by Adelheid Lange Roosevelt, an American Cubist artist. Roosevelt was an acquaintance of de Zayas, and he exhibited some of her works at his gallery.

== See also ==
- List of avant-garde magazines
