= Steerage =

Class of passenger accommodation in a ship

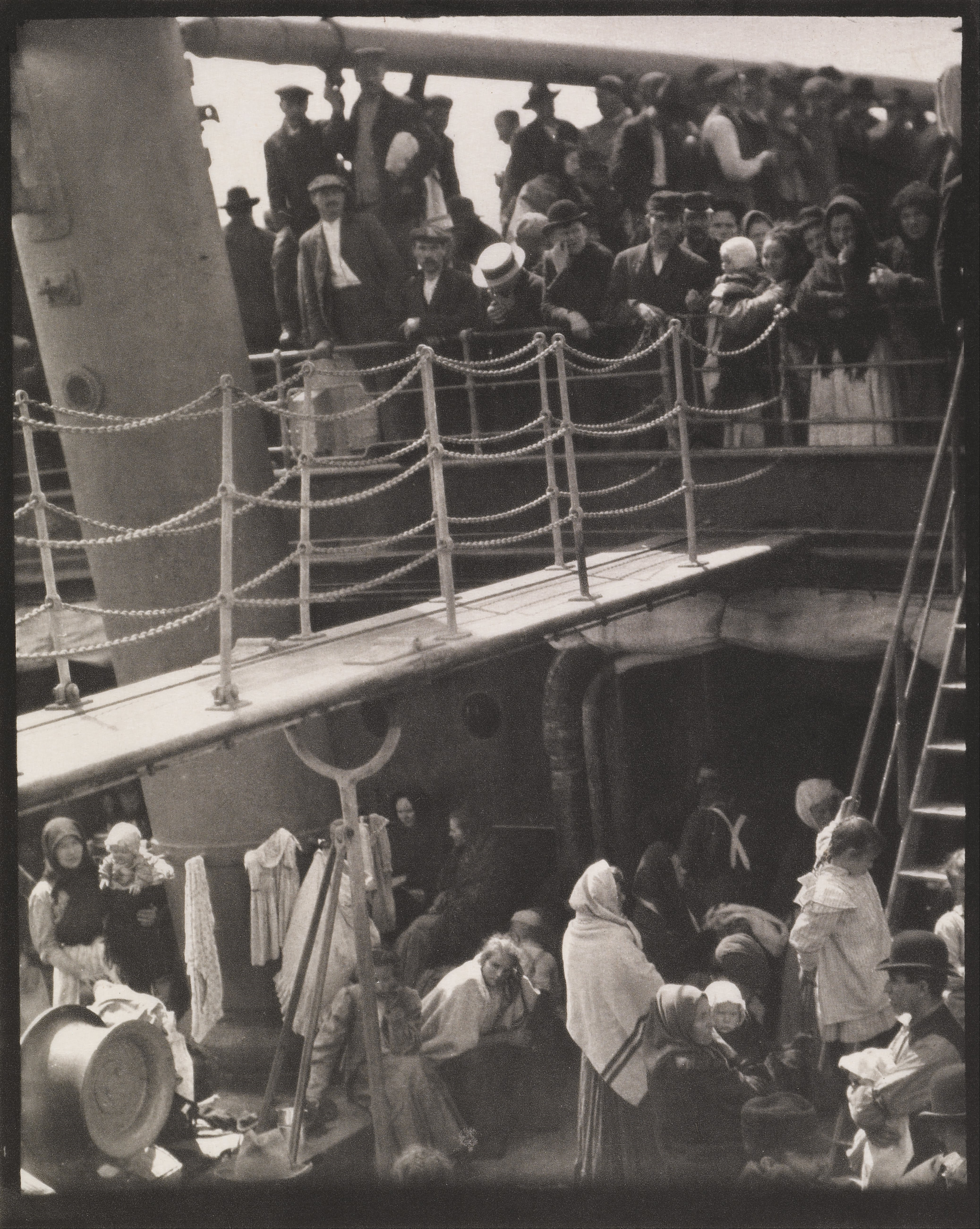
The Steerage by Alfred Stieglitz. Taken in 1907 on the Kaiser Wilhelm II The middle-class passengers on the upper deck are looking down on steerage passengers below.

Steerage is a term for the lowest category of passenger accommodation in a ship. In the nineteenth and early twentieth century, considerable numbers of persons travelled from their homeland to seek a new life elsewhere, in many cases the Americas and Australia. Many of those people were destitute in their homeland and had only the minimum of resources to procure transportation. The term later widened to imply the lowest category of accommodation on a passenger vessel.

== Steerage class travel ==
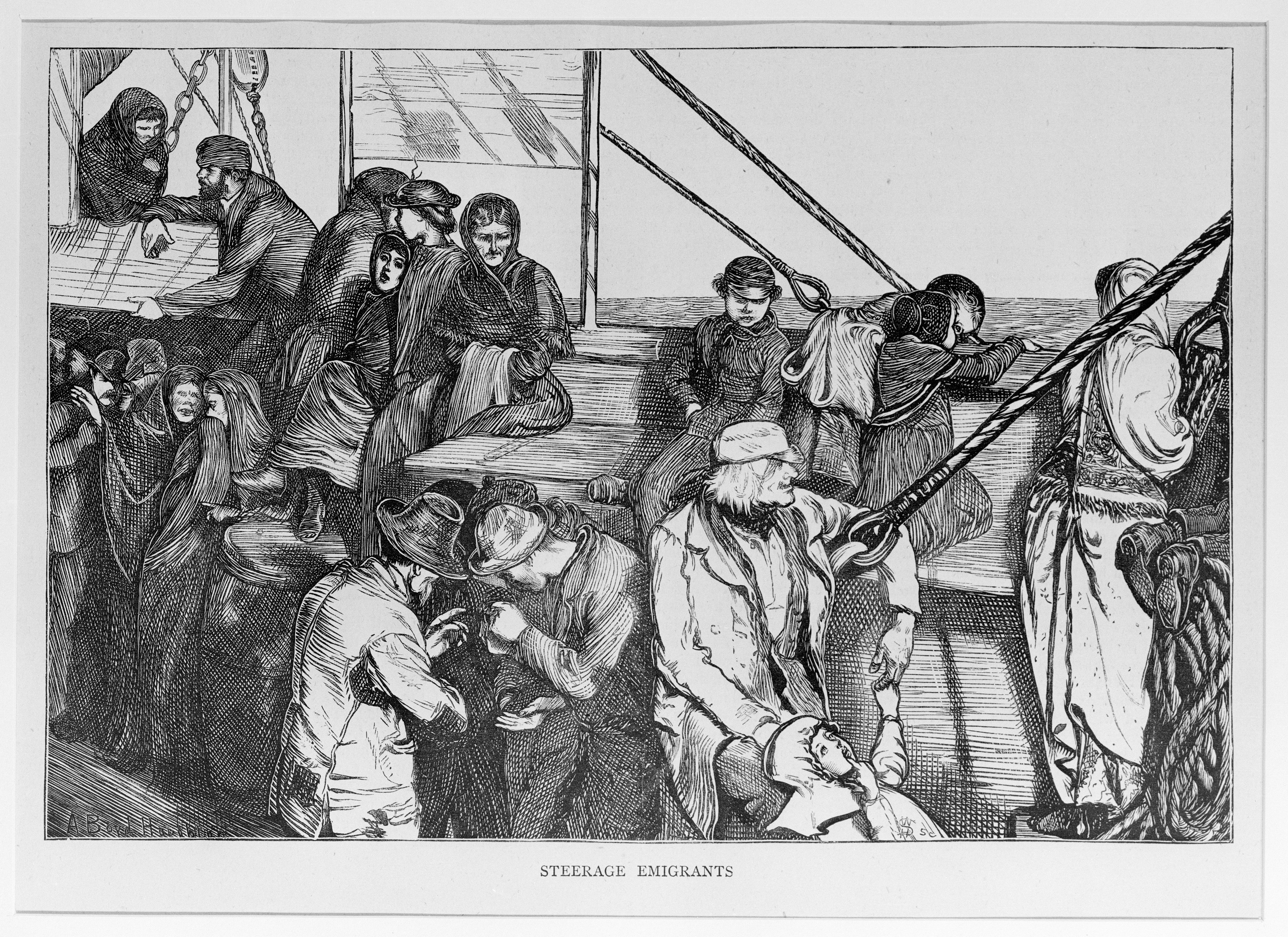
Steerage Emigrants, print after Arthur Boyd Houghton

Steerage refers to the lowest possible category of long-distance steamer travel. It was available to very poor people, usually emigrants seeking a new life in the New World, chiefly North America and Australia. In many cases, these people had no financial resources and were attempting to escape destitution at home. Consequently, they needed transportation at an absolute minimum cost. In many cases they provided their own bedding and food. Steerage was very cramped and there was virtually no ventilation. The poor conditions and the very long voyages could contribute to en route deaths of passengers in steerage. The word likely comes from the fact that these accommodations were originally located near the ship's rudder.

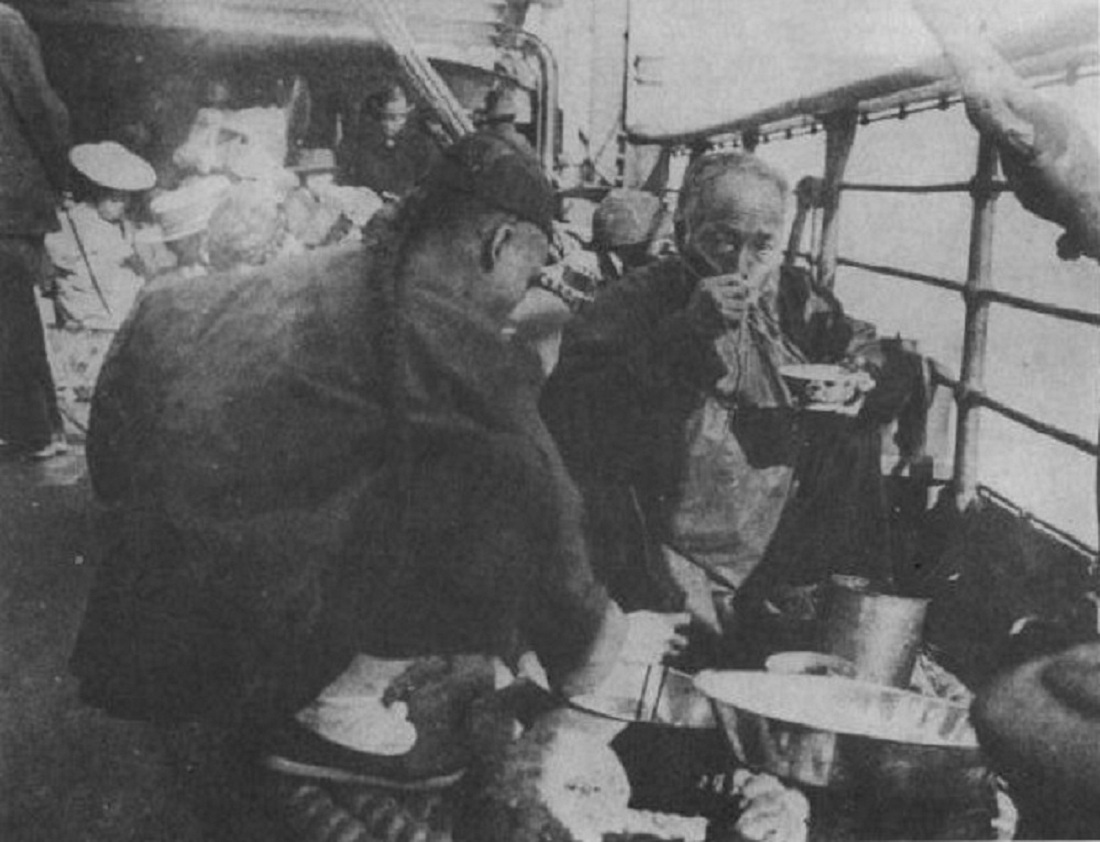
Chinese steerage passengers, on board the S.S. China en route to Hawaii in 1901

The term steerage was used to refer to the lowest category of accommodation, usually not including proper sleeping accommodation. In the United Kingdom, it was often referred to as third class, but there were instances where steerage was effectively fourth-class. In time, the designation came to refer to the lowest category in general, and in modern times is sometimes used sarcastically to refer to any uncomfortable accommodation in an airliner, ship or train.

Beds were often long rows of large shared bunks with straw mattresses and no bed linens.

A commentator described conditions in steerage aboard the SS Kaiser Wilhelm II in 1906:

900 steerage passengers [are] crowded into the hold of ... the Kaiser Wilhelm II, of the North German Lloyd line[. They] are positively packed like cattle, making a walk on deck when the weather is good, absolutely impossible, while to breathe clean air below in rough weather, when the hatches are down is an equal impossibility. The stenches become unbearable... [and the] division between the sexes is not carefully looked after, and the young women who are quartered among the married passengers have neither the privacy to which they are entitled nor are they much more protected than if they were living promiscuously. The food, which is miserable, is dealt out of huge kettles into the dinner pails provided by the steamship company.
