= Paul Haviland =

French-American photographer, writer and arts critic

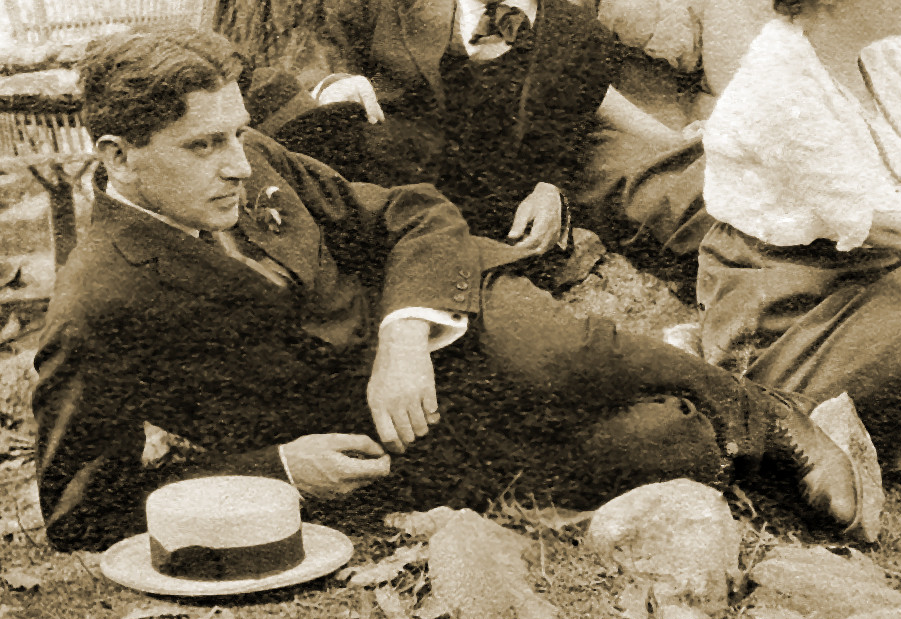
Paul Haviland, 1912

Paul Burty Haviland (17 June 1880 – 21 December 1950) was a French-American photographer, writer and arts critic who was closely associated with Alfred Stieglitz and the Photo-Secession.

== Biography ==
Haviland was born to Charles Edward and Madeleine Burty Haviland in Paris. His father owned Haviland & Co., a well-known china manufacturer in Limoges, and his mother was the daughter of art critic Philippe Burty. His family was very wealthy for the time, and Haviland grew up surrounded by art, music and theater. He received an undergraduate degree from the University of Paris, and from 1899 to 1902 went to graduate school at Harvard University. After graduating he worked from 1901 to 1917 in New York as a representative of his father's china firm. He did so to please his father, but in reality he spent as little time as possible in his office.

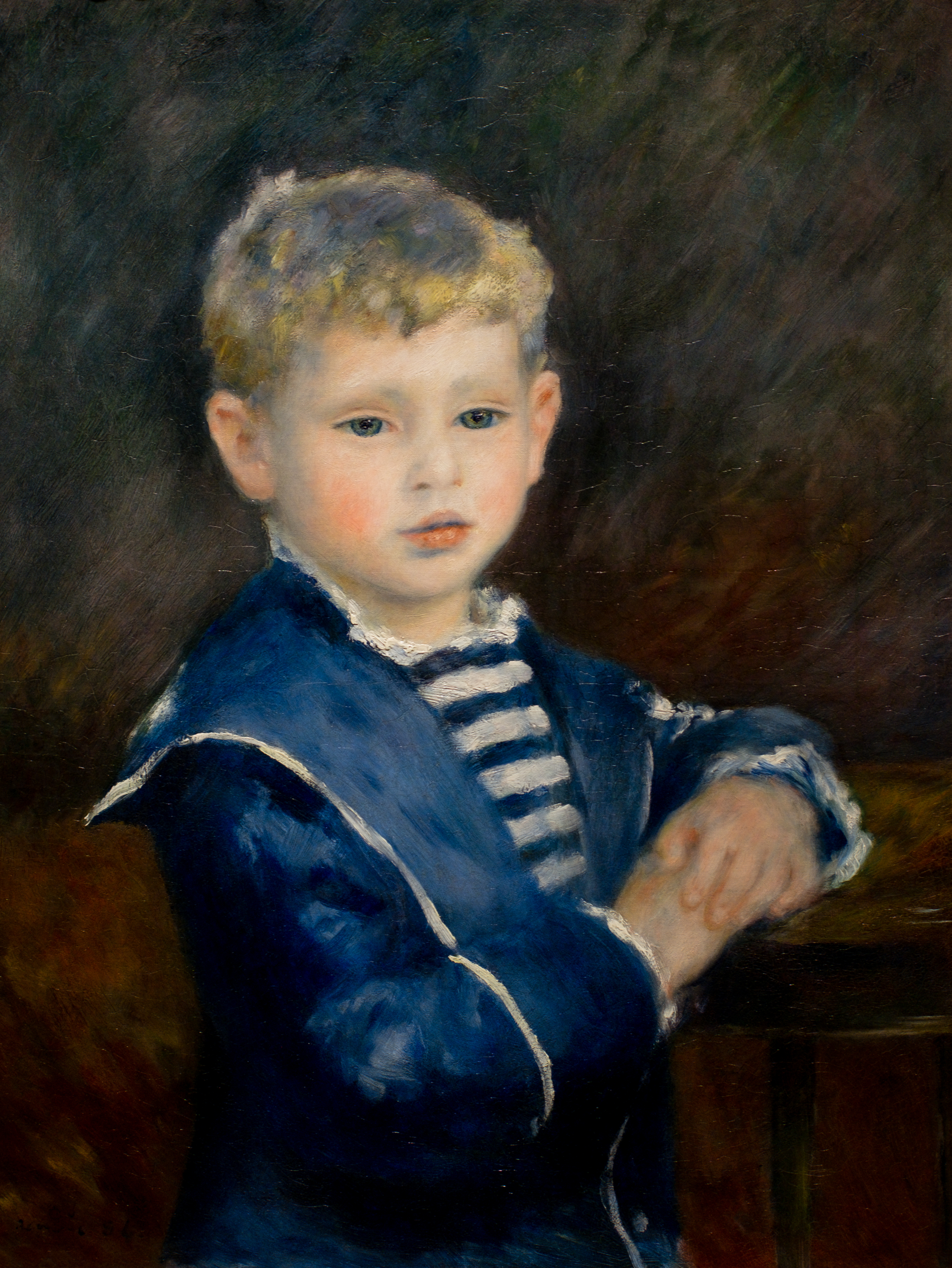
Portrait of Haviland as a child, by Renoir (1884)

In early 1908, he and his brother Frank, who was a photographer, went to see the exhibition of Rodin drawings at the Little Galleries of the Photo-Secession, where he met Stieglitz. Both he and his brother bought works from the exhibit, and soon he and Stieglitz were engaged in long discussions about art and culture. Haviland considered the gallery "a unique oasis of cultivation" and soon spent most of his time there. A few months later, Stieglitz told him the gallery was going to close because of a substantial increase in the rent, and without telling Stieglitz Haviland went to the landlord and signed a three-year lease for an even larger space directly across the hall. Stieglitz was so appreciative of Haviland's generosity that for the next decade the two were nearly inseparable friends and colleagues.

Beginning in 1909, Haviland began writing regular columns for Stieglitz's journal Camera Work, and later that year one of his photographs was published in the magazine (Portrait – Miss G.G., No 28, October). A year later he was named associate editor. He also functioned as secretary of the gallery and helped organize many of the shows of French artists.

In 1912 Haviland won first prize in annual John Wanamaker Exhibition of Photographs in Philadelphia (judged by Stieglitz). A few months later six more of his photographs were published in Camera Work (No 39, 1912).

In 1913, Haviland co-authored, with Marius de Zayas, one of the first extended essays on modern art, "A Study of the Modern Evolution of Plastic Expression (New York, 1913)."

In 1914 his brother Frank Burty had one-man show at Stieglitz's gallery, which by then was known as "291". Later that year two more of Haviland's photos were published in Camera Work (No 46).

In 1915, Haviland teamed up with two other people who had become regulars at "291", Agnes Ernest Meyer and de Zayas. They were frustrated with Stieglitz handling of artists at the time and felt the galley had become stuck in a rut. They proposed a new publication to help re-energize both Stieglitz and the gallery. Haviland soon became one of the driving forces and editors of a new and then radical magazine, also called 291 after the gallery. For the next year Haviland put much of his energy into editing and publishing the magazine with his co-workers.

In 1916, his father summoned him back to France to deal with the family business in Limoges. Due to his father's poor health he remained in France, and the next year he married Suzanne Lalique, daughter of famous Art Nouveau glass designer René Lalique.

While in France Haviland corresponded frequently with Stieglitz, but because of his new bride and his increasing involvement in the family's business he never returned to New York.

His father died in 1922 and for several years Haviland was completely absorbed by legal entanglements concerning the ownership of the business. The estate was finally settled in 1925, and afterward he used his share of the estate to purchase a 17th-century priory in Yzeures-sur-Creuse. He turned the grounds into a vineyard and spent the rest of his life making wine and living as a gentleman farmer.

He is a Righteous Among the Nations, for his rescuing of Jewish people during World War II.

Havilland died in Paris and was buried in 1950 with his wife in Yzeures-sur-Creuse.

== Gallery ==
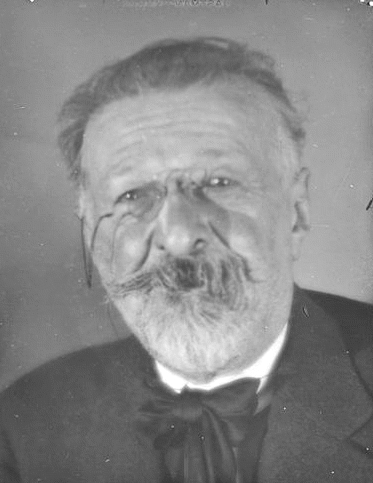
French painter, Georges Picard, who died at Haviland's home

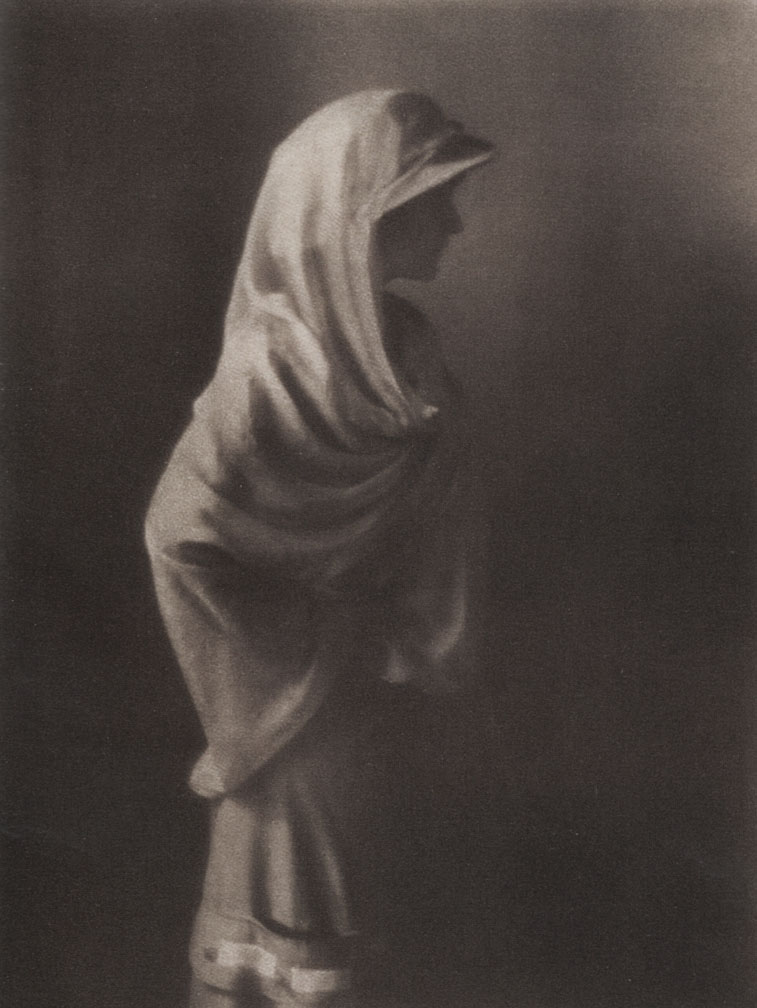
"Miss Doris Keane", published in Camera Work, No 39, 1912

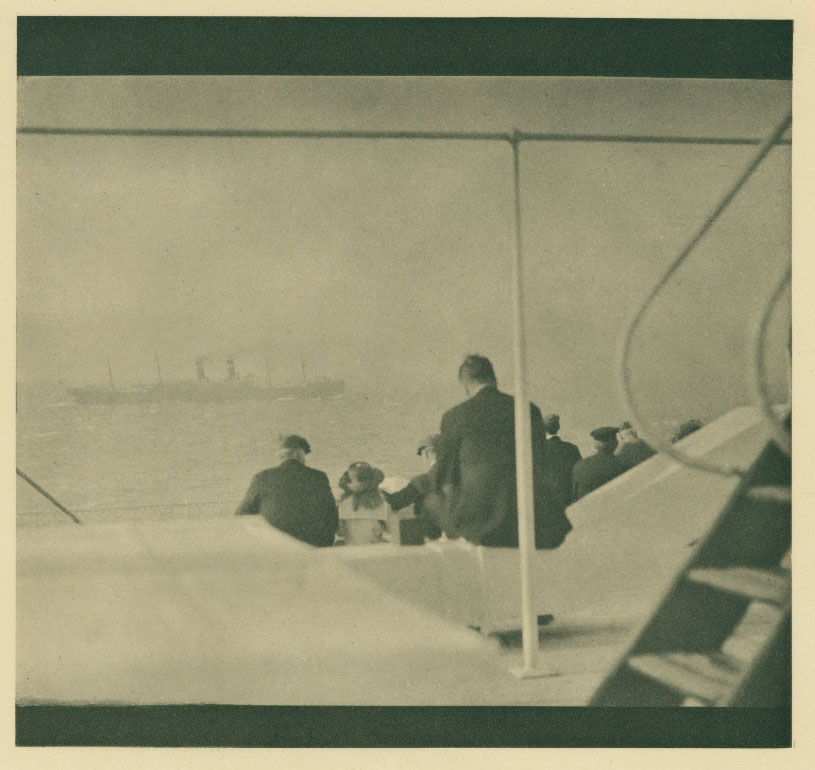
Passing Steamer (1912)

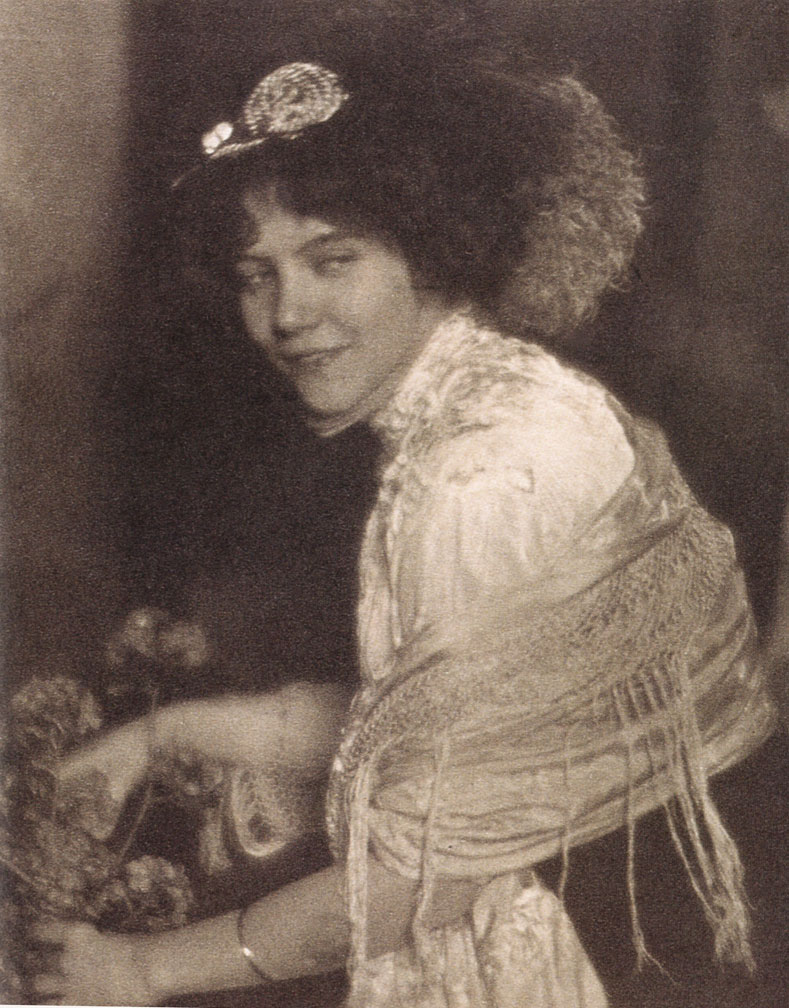
"Miss G.G.", published in Camera Work, No 28, 1909

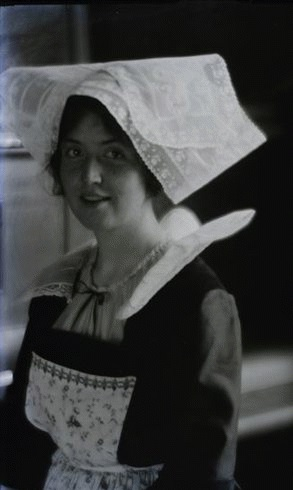
Soprano Loraine Wyman, wearing a Breton peasant costume
