= Marius de Zayas =

Mexican artist (1880–1961)

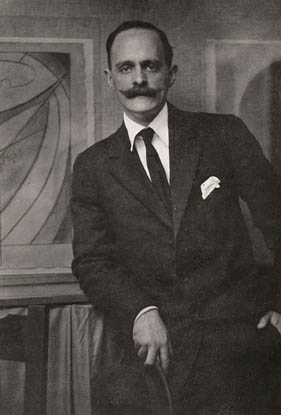
- Marius de Zayas (1913), by Alfred Stieglitz
- Born: March 13, 1880; Veracruz, Mexico
- Died: 10 January 1961 (aged 80); Stamford, Connecticut, U.S.

Marius de Zayas Enriquez y Calmet (March 13, 1880 – January 10, 1961), was an early 20th-century Mexican artist, writer and art gallery owner who was influential in the New York arts circles of the 1910s and 1920s.

== Life ==
De Zayas was born to wealthy and aristocratic parents in Veracruz, Mexico. His father, Rafael de Zayas (1848–1932), was a noted journalist, novelist, dramatist, poet and lawyer of Spanish origin. He established two newspapers in Veracruz, and it was there that his sons Marius and George developed their artistic careers by providing illustrations for the papers.

In 1906 the two brothers began providing caricatures for Mexico City's leading newspaper El Diario, which was founded by American-born journalist Benjamin De Casseres. A year later the de Zayas newspapers took a strong editorial stance against Mexican President Porfirio Diaz, and under threat their family left Mexico and settled in New York.

Shortly after arriving in New York, de Zayas took a position drawing caricatures for the New York Evening World, and he quickly established a reputation for his witty parodies of prominent citizens. Through his connections with other artists in the city he became acquainted with Alfred Stieglitz, and in January 1909 Stieglitz exhibited a group of de Zayas's caricatures at his art gallery, "291". A year later Stieglitz gave de Zayas another exhibit in which he brought his caricatures to a three-dimensional level. On a large wooden platform he created more than 100 free-standing cardboard cutouts of some of New York's most prominent people, seen strolling down Fifth Avenue in front of the Plaza Hotel. The show became such a hit that lines were often stretched far outside the doorway to the gallery, and the work remained on display for six months.

"Mrs Brown-Potter" by Marius de Zayas. Published in Camera Work, No 29 1910

In October 1910 de Zayas traveled to Paris, where he stayed for almost a year while scouting out artists and art trends for Stieglitz. It was there that he saw his first work of Cubist art, although he did not at first recall the name of the artist. It turned out that the artist was Picasso, and, because of their common language, de Zayas conducted the first major interview with him two months later. He immediately published an article based upon his interview, and it became the first publication to record Picasso's own views of his work.They formed a fast friendship and de Zayas promoted Picasso's work in New York.

It was also while in Paris that de Zayas first saw African art, and he recognized its influences on the development of some of the modern art he was seeing there. He proposed an exhibit of African art to Stieglitz, and in 1914 one of the first exhibits of African art as seen in the context of modern art was held at "291".

"Rodin and Steichen" by Marius de Zayas. Published in Camera Work, No 46, 1914

In 1911 he returned to New York, and as a result of his experiences in Paris he began to explore new, more abstract style of caricature. His new approach resulted in his last but most important exhibit at "291" in April–May 1913.

In the spring of 1914 de Zayas returned to Paris and renewed an earlier friendship with Francis Picabia. The latter introduced de Zayas to his circle of artists and writers, including Guillaume Apollinaire, Gertrude Stein, George Bernard Shaw and Alvin Langdon Coburn. De Zayas was captivated by the new work he saw there, and he once again wrote to Stieglitz and recommended shows for Picabia, Picasso and Georges Braque.

De Zayas returned to New York when World War I broke out in Europe later that year. He immediately began collaborating with his friend and colleague Paul Haviland about ways to re-energize the New York art scene, and together with writer and arts patron Agnes Ernst Meyer they convinced Stieglitz to publish a new magazine which would be called 291 in honor of his gallery of the same name. For the next year de Zayas spent a considerable amount of time and energy both editing and creating works of art for the new publication. His interpretations of poems by Meyer and others introduced the concept of visual poetry to the United States. While 291 was an artistic success, it did not attract a wide audience and ceased publication after only twelve issues.

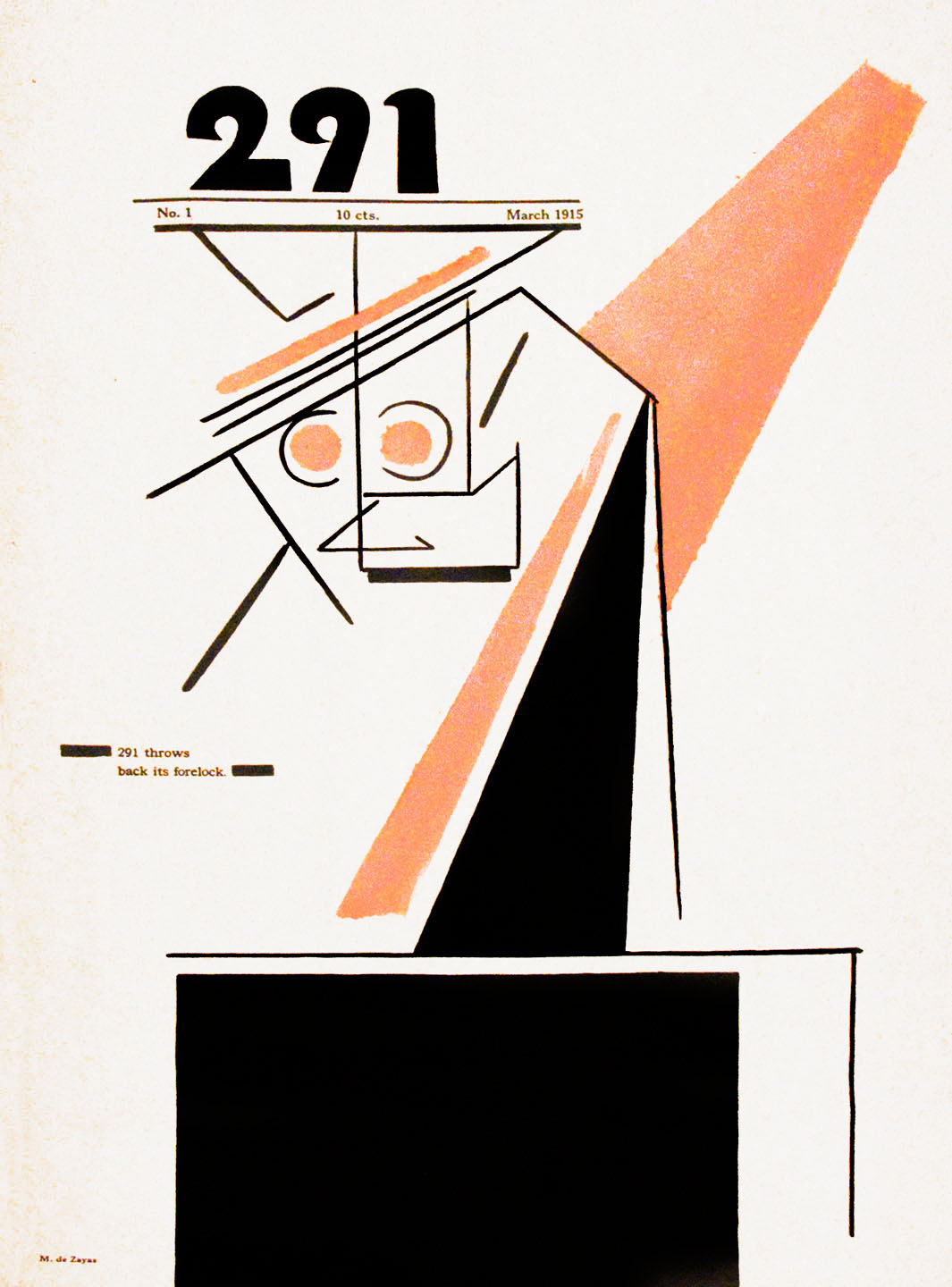
291 Throws Back Its Forelock by Marius de Zayas. Cover of 291, No 1, 1915

During this same period de Zayas convinced Meyer that a new art gallery was needed to further the cause of avant-garde art in New York, and, with her financial support, in October 1915 he opened The Modern Gallery on Fifth Avenue. For the next three years the gallery presented a steady flow of works by Picasso, Picabia, Braque, Cézanne, van Gogh, Brâncuși, Rivera and other modern artists. Although de Zayas announced his new gallery as "an additional expression of '291'" Stieglitz saw it as a direct competitor to his own gallery, and as a result his friendship and collaboration with de Zayas deteriorated.

During this same time he and Haviland co-authored a book on modern art, and in 1916 they published A Study of the Modern Evolution of Plastic Expression (New York, 1916). The book was called "One of the first serious attempts to deal with the central problems of modern art."

De Zayas changed the name of the Modern Gallery to the De Zayas Gallery in 1919 and continued showing artists for the next two years. When his galleries closed, he returned to Europe and spent the next twenty years in Europe organizing important traveling exhibitions of modern art.

In the late 1930s, he married Virginia Harrison, daughter of congressman and governor-general of the Philippines Francis Burton Harrison and descendant of the railroad tycoon, Charles Crocker.

At the insistence of Museum of Modern Art Director Alfred Barr in the 1940s, De Zayas began writing a history of the introduction of modern art to New York. He assembled many notes, comments and photos into a manuscript. The work was published posthumously in 1996.

De Zayas returned to the United States after World War II, settling first in Stamford, Connecticut, then in Greenwich, Connecticut. He died in Stamford hospital in 1961 at the age of eighty-one.

== Bibliography ==
- Rodrigo de Zayas, Marius de Zayas, followed by Quand, comment et pourquoi l’art moderne est allé de Paris à New York, 2 vol, Nîmes, éd. Atelier Baie, 2021 (French)
