= Katharine Weymouth =

American lawyer and businesswoman (born 1966)

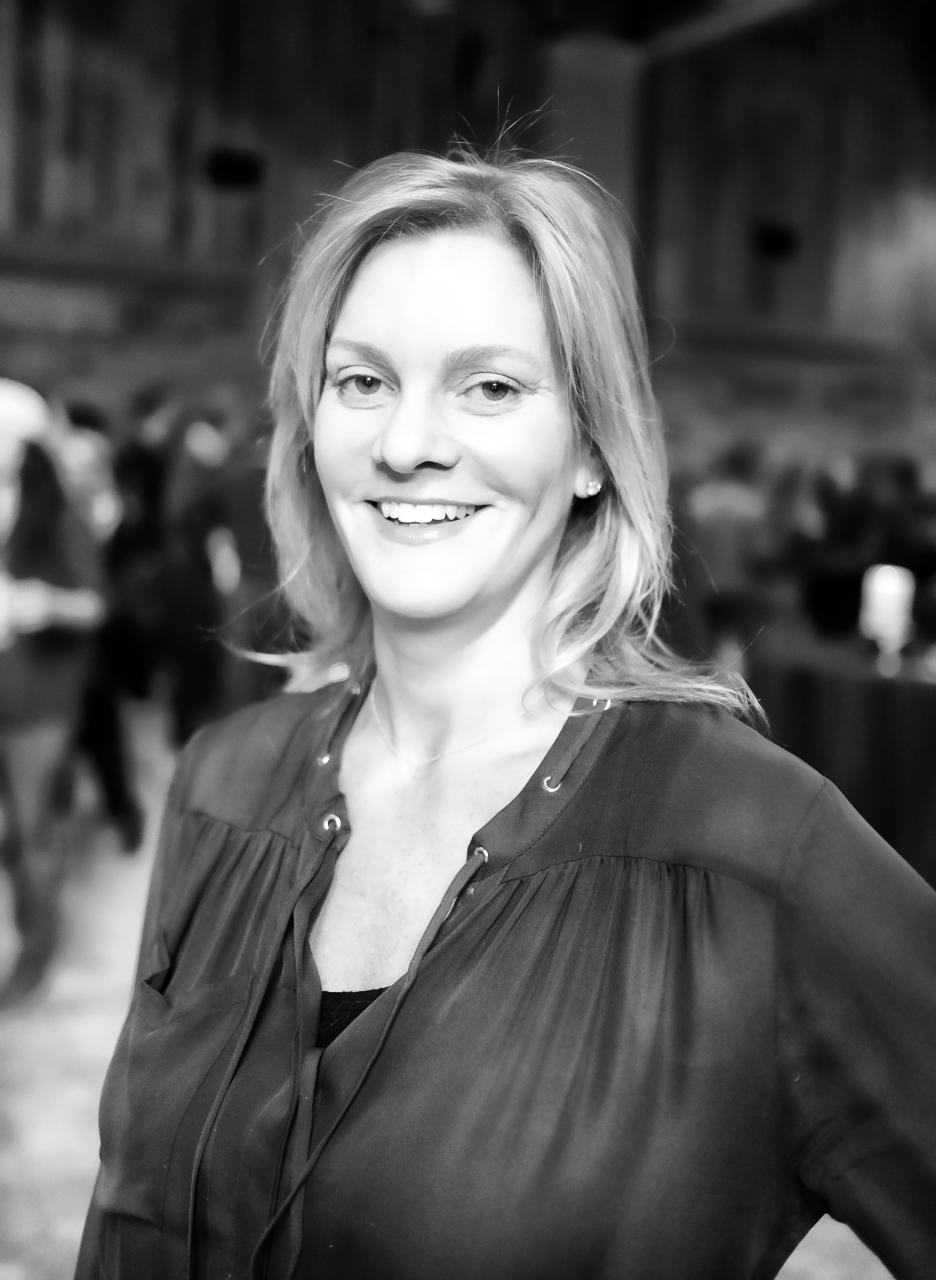
- Weymouth in 2014
- Born: Katharine Bouchage Weymouth; May 28, 1966 (age 60)
- Education: Harvard University (BA); Stanford University (JD)
- Occupations: Publisher; CEO
- Known for: Past-publisher of The Washington Post
- Children: 3
- Parents: Yann Weymouth (father); Lally Weymouth (mother)
- Relatives: Tina Weymouth (aunt); Katharine Graham (grandmother); Eugene Meyer (grand-grandfather)

Katharine Bouchage Weymouth (born May 28, 1966) is an American lawyer and businesswoman who was publisher of The Washington Post and chief executive officer of Washington Post Media from 2008 to 2014.

== Early life and education ==
Weymouth is the daughter of Lally Weymouth and Yann Weymouth. Weymouth grew up on the Upper East Side of Manhattan, New York City, where she attended the Dalton School and the Brearley School. She later attended Harvard College, earning a BA magna cum laude in literature in 1988; her thesis focused on Mark Twain. Next she studied literature for a year at Oxford University. She earned her JD from Stanford Law School in 1992.

== Career ==
While an associate at Williams & Connolly, a prominent law firm in Washington, D.C., Weymouth went to work as an assistant counsel of the Post in 1996. She later became the head of advertising. Weymouth was named publisher of the Post and chief executive officer of Washington Post Media on February 7, 2008, succeeding Boisfeuillet Jones Jr.

Among her first actions as publisher was hiring Marcus Brauchli as executive editor and placing him in charge of both newspaper and the website (the previous editor had not been in charge of the website). The hire from outside the organization "surprised the newsroom. ... Brauchli ... had accepted a large payout and resigned from his previous job, running The Wall Street Journal under its new owner, Rupert Murdoch", as a 2012 Times account put it. The 2012 account outlined signs and reports that more recently her relationship with Brauchli may have "cooled" and noted that Raju Narisetti, whom Brauchli had brought with him from the Journal as a close partner "in the digital reinvention of the newsroom", had left the Post in January. However, the Times also said that "[b]y one important measure, The Post’s efforts are paying off. As of 2012 it has averaged 19.6 million unique visitors a month, according to comScore, making it the second-most-visited American newspaper Web site, behind that of The New York Times."

=== Private dinner salon initiative ===
In July 2009, in the midst of intense debate over health care reform, Politico reported that a health care lobbyist had received an "astonishing" offer of access to the Post's "health care reporting and editorial staff." Weymouth had planned a series of exclusive dinner parties or "salons" at her private residence, to which she had invited prominent lobbyists, trade group members, politicians and business people. The cost of attendance to the parties was up to $250,000 per individual, with the events being closed to the press and the public. Politico's revelation sparked controversy in Washington, as it gave the impression the parties' sole purpose was to allow a select group of Washington insiders and business people to purchase face time with Post reporters.

Almost immediately, Weymouth canceled the salons and blamed the entire incident on the marketing department at The Post. The backlash also prompted David G. Bradley, publisher of The Atlantic, to admit that he hosts similar off-the-record discussions at his home and office at the Watergate complex, and in 2012, looking back on the incident, the Times said that "magazines host similar conferences all the time".

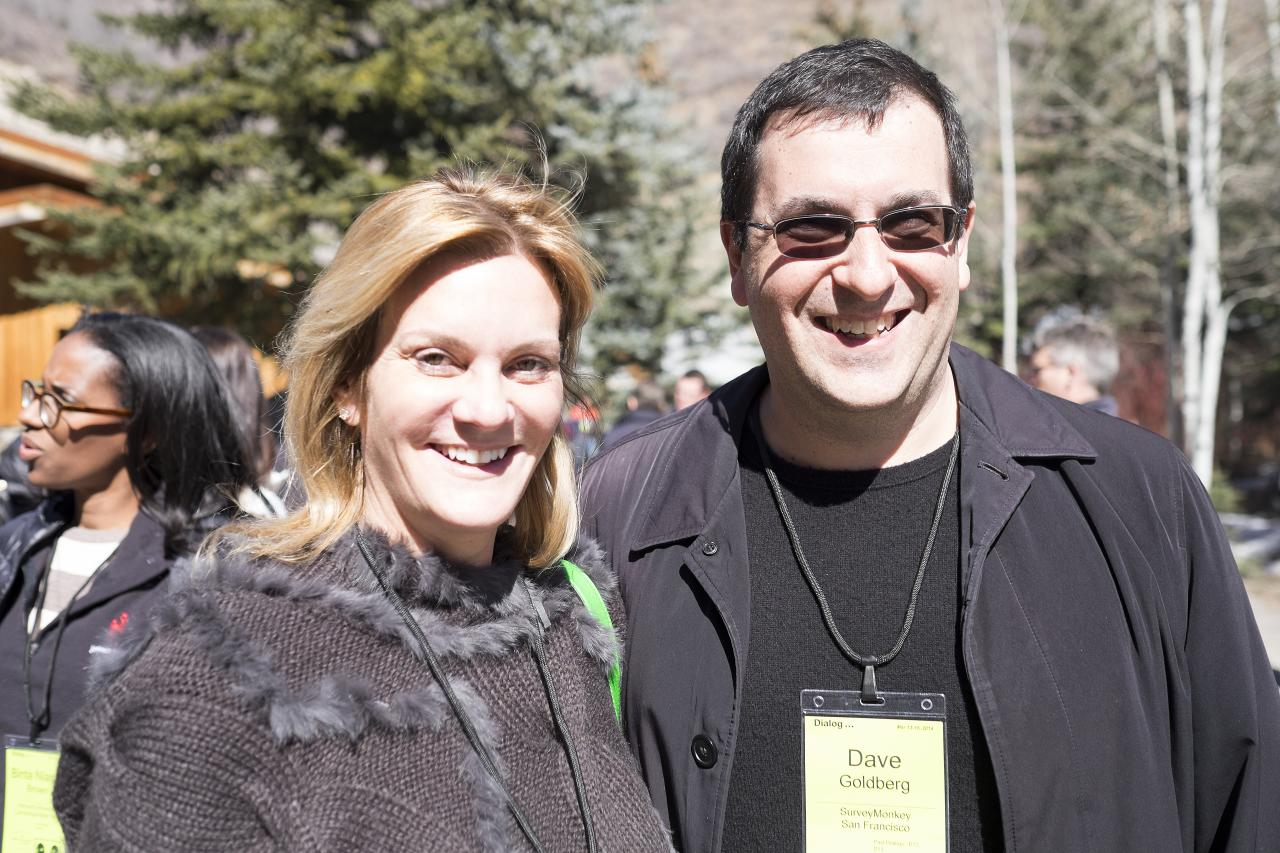
Weymouth and Dave Goldberg in March 2014

=== Resignation ===
On September 2, 2014, it was announced that she would resign as publisher the following month, with the position to be assumed by Politico's founding CEO Fred Ryan.

=== After the Post ===
In 2015, tech startup FiscalNote announced that Weymouth would serve as an adviser to the company. She is now CEO of dineXpert, a company that calls itself a community for independent restaurant owners. In December 2024, Weymouth joined Blu Ventures as a venture partner on its Cyber Seed Fund Investment Committee.

Weymouth endorsed Democratic candidate Hillary Clinton in the run-up to the 2016 U.S. presidential election.

On September 27, 2019, Katharine Weymouth stepped into the role of board chair of the Greater Washington Community Foundation. Her grandmother Katharine Graham had also served on the foundation's board.

== Family ==
Weymouth is a daughter of columnist and publishing heiress Lally Weymouth and the architect Yann R. Weymouth. She is a granddaughter and namesake of long-time Washington Post chairwoman and publisher Katharine Graham. Her mother's family owned the Post from 1933, when the bankrupt paper was bought by Weymouth's great-grandfather (Fed chairman Eugene Meyer), until it was sold to Jeff Bezos in 2013. Weymouth is the fifth member of her family to have held the publisher position.

On her father's side Weymouth is a niece of Tina Weymouth, a former member of the band Talking Heads. Her paternal grandfather is Admiral Ralph Weymouth. One of her paternal ancestors is the Breton writer Anatole Le Braz.

Weymouth married lawyer Richard Alan Scully on July 25, 1998. The couple later divorced. They have three children.

Media offices
Preceded by Boisfeuillet Jones Jr.	CEO and Publisher of "The Washington Post"; 2008 - 2014	Succeeded by Fred Ryan
