= Katharine Rhoades =

American painter

Katharine Nash Rhoades
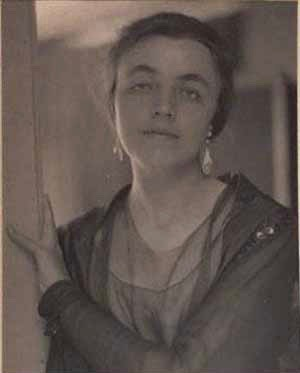
- Katharine Rhoades, 1915, photograph by Alfred Stieglitz
- Born: November 30, 1885; New York, New York
- Died: October 26, 1965 (aged 79)
- Resting place: Sharon, Connecticut
- Known for: Painting, illustration, Poetry
- Movement: American modernism

Katharine Nash Rhoades (November 30, 1885 - October 26, 1965) was an American painter, poet and illustrator born in New York City. She was also a feminist.

== Early life and education ==
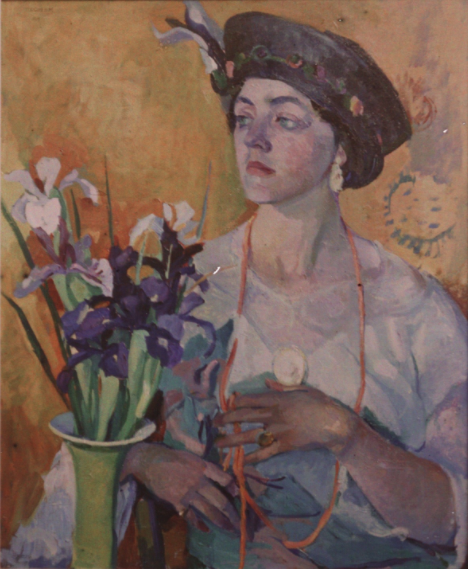
Marion H. Beckett, Katharine N. Rhoades, ca. 1915

Katharine Nash Rhoades, born November 30, 1885, was the daughter of Lyman Rhoades (1847–1907), a banker, and Elizabeth Nash (1856-1919) of New York City. She was the middle child, with two brothers, Lyman Nash and Stephen Nash Rhoades. She attended the Veltin School for Girls in Manhattan.

Rhoades was a debutante in 1904, as was Malvina Hoffman, with whom she traveled with Marion H. Beckett to Paris in 1908. She studied art there for two years. She studied with Robert Henri.

== Career ==
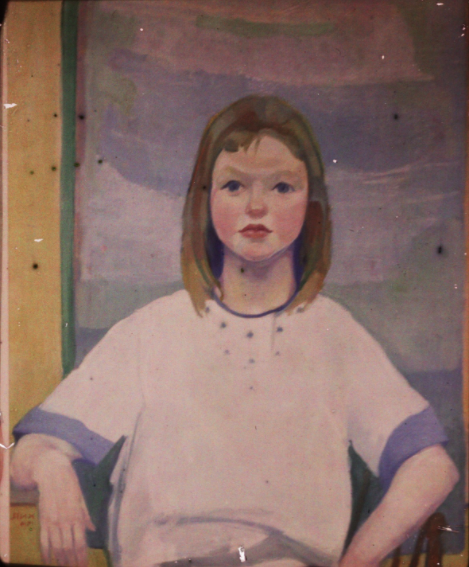
Katharine Rhoades, Mary Steichen, ca. 1915

Rhoades was one of the artists who exhibited at the landmark 1913 International Exhibition of Modern Art show. The show included one of her oil paintings, Talloires, ($400).

She, along with Agnes Ernst Meyer and Marion Beckett were known as "the Three Graces" of the Alfred Stieglitz art circle. They were models for photographs by Stieglitz and Edward Steichen, paintings by Steichen, caricatures by Francis Picabia, drawings by Marius de Zayas, and paintings by Arthur Beecher Carles. Marsden Hartley remembered Rhoades and Beckett as being “both six feet, beautiful and always together“.

She posed for photographs by Stieglitz beginning in 1914. Rhoades contributed poems and illustrations to Camera Work a quarterly journal published by Alfred Stieglitz, like poems that were published in 1914. She was also an editor and contributor to 291, an arts and literary magazine. For the "What '291' Means to Me" issue, she wrote, "I touch four walls—I hear voices... those who have touched its world—I too went gazing, questioning, answering... I too merged with the voices; and the walls echoed".

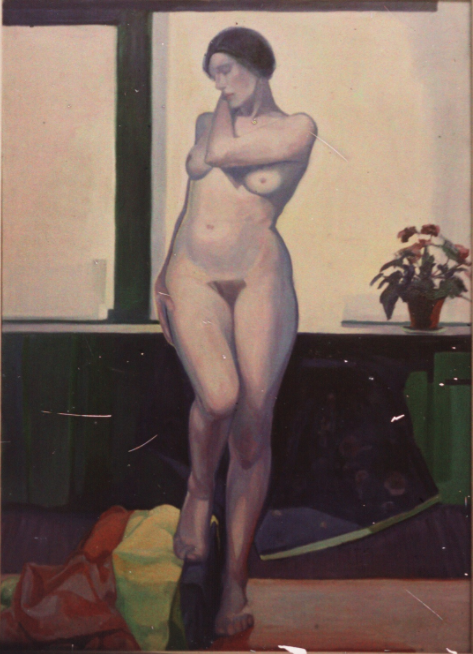
Katharine Rhoades, Standing Nude, ca. 1915

In 1914, Rhoades and Beckett exhibited the modern works of art at the National Arts Club. The following year, the two women had a joint exhibition at Stieglitz's 291 Gallery. She had her first exhibit of her avant-garde paintings at the gallery that year. Her paintings were similar to the works of Matisse before World War I. She burned many of her paintings made before the 1920s, her work during that time had elements of Cubism. She contributed to the formation of the Dada movement.

Rhoades, who was Charles Freer's secretary about 1913, was named as a lifetime trustee of the Freer Gallery of Art in Washington, D.C., in his will. The other trustees were Agnes and Eugene Meyer. The gallery opened in 1923. The Meyers named their daughter, Katharine, the wife of Philip Graham and publisher of The Washington Post after her. In 1937, she co-founded a religious library now part of the Ball duPont Library at The University of the South in Sewanee, Tennessee.

== Personal life ==
She may have had a romantic relationship with Stieglitz, or it may have been one-sided interest on his part, before he met Georgia O'Keeffe. Rhoades and Stieglitz remained good friends, and along with other members of his circle, she stayed at Stieglitz's summer home in Lake George. O'Keeffe said that she found Rhoades to be a "wonderful person" whom she always liked and corresponded.

She had an affair with Arthur Beecher Carles.

Rhoades died October 26, 1965, and was buried with her parents and other family members at the Hillside Burial Grounds in Sharon, Connecticut.

== Gallery ==
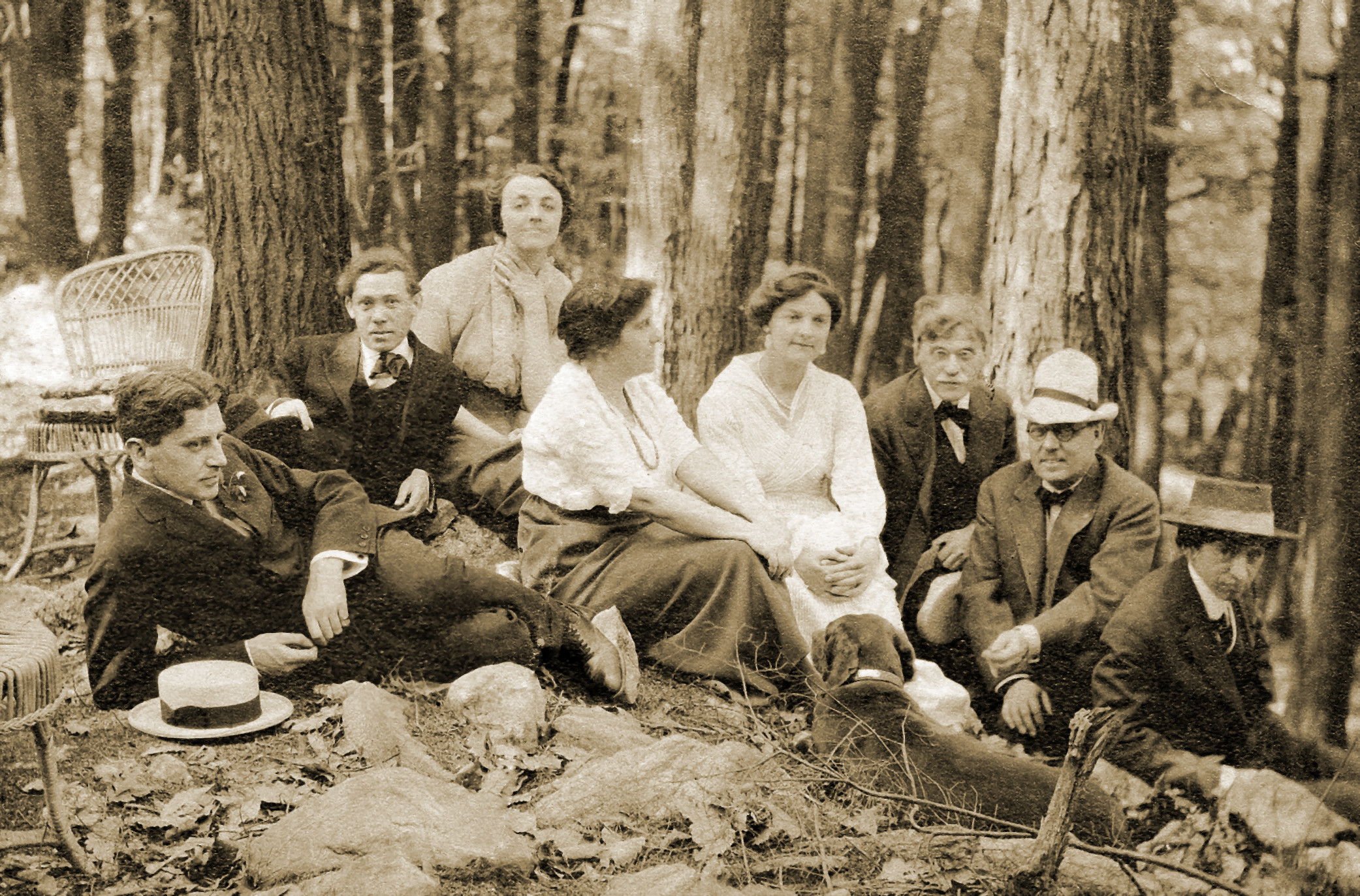
Group of artists at Mount Kisco in 1912, left to right: Paul Haviland, Abraham Walkowitz, Katharine Rhoades, Emmy Stieglitz, Agnes Meyer, Alfred Stieglitz, John Barrett Kerfoot, John Marin

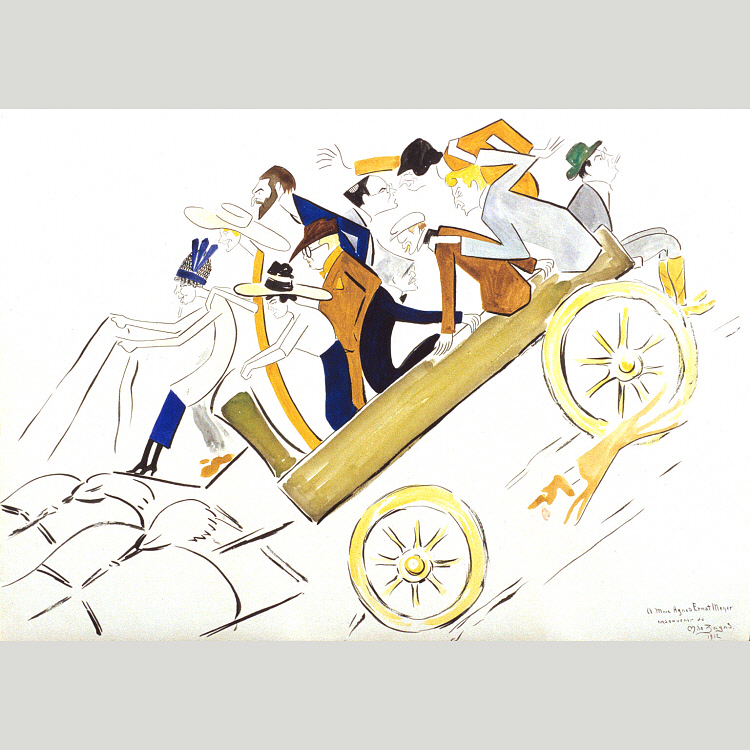
Marius de Zayas, The Picnic, 1912, Katharine Rhoades in the driver's seat, with Agnes Meyer, Eugene, Alfred Stieglitz, his wife, some critics, John Marin, Paul Haviland, and Marius de Zayas (in a cap)
