= Katharine the Great =

Unauthorized biography of American newspaper magnate

- Author: Deborah Davis
- Language: English
- Subject: Katharine Graham
- Publication date: 1979
- Publication place: United States

Katharine the Great: Katharine Graham and The Washington Post is an unauthorized biography of Katharine Graham, owner of The Washington Post, authored by journalist Deborah Davis and initially published in 1979.

The book was first published by Harcourt Brace Jovanovich (HBJ), but they withdrew the book from circulation after a few weeks and returned the rights to Davis after citing that "certain facts and circumstances have arisen since publication." Davis sued HBJ for $6 million in 1982 for breach of contract, alleging the recall came after a letter from the Post's executive editor, Benjamin C. Bradlee to the publisher; Bradlee called the publication of the book "completely irresponsible" and then listed 39 errors where his name appeared. The suit was settled out of court for $100,000.

== Synopsis ==
This biography of Katharine Graham, including details of the death of her husband Philip Graham in 1963, advances some theories that have met with considerable controversy. For example, Davis claimed that the source behind the Watergate scandal, popularly known as Deep Throat, was a CIA officer named Richard Ober (in fact, it was later revealed that Deep Throat had been FBI Associate Director Mark Felt). She also claims that the Washington Post's executive editor, Benjamin C. Bradlee, was part of a CIA propaganda plan to support the convictions of spies Julius and Ethel Rosenberg.

== Criticism ==
The book received unfavorable reviews from the Los Angeles Times, The Washington Post, The New York Times and others.

Davis' 1983 settlement with HBJ was heralded as a victory for writers by Eve Pell of The Nation, but Pell saw both at fault for failing to fact check.

== Release details ==
It was republished in 1987 by National Press Inc., and again in 1991, this time by Sheridan Square Press.
