= Lally Weymouth =

American journalist (1943–2025)

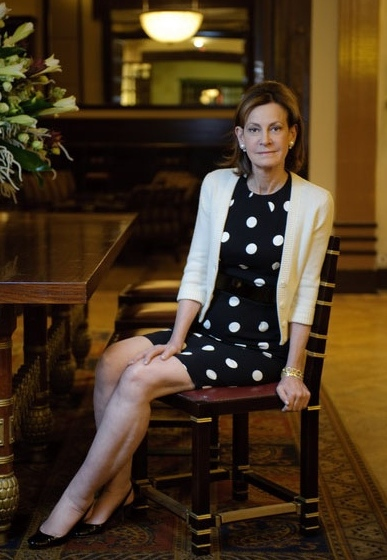
- Weymouth in 2009
- Born: Elizabeth Morris Graham; July 3, 1943; Washington D.C., U.S.
- Died: September 29, 2025 (aged 82); New York City, U.S.
- Education: Radcliffe College
- Spouse: Yann Weymouth (m. 1963; div. 1969)
- Children: 2, including Katharine
- Parents: Phil Graham (father); Katharine Meyer (mother)
- Family: Donald E. Graham (brother); Eugene Meyer (grandfather); Ernest R. Graham (grandfather); Bob Graham (uncle); Florence Meyer (aunt); Gwen Graham (cousin); Joseph Newmark (great great-grandfather)

Elizabeth Morris "Lally" Graham Weymouth (July 3, 1943 – September 29, 2025) was an American journalist, and senior associate editor of The Washington Post. She was previously special diplomatic correspondent for Newsweek magazine during her family's ownership of the publication.

== Early life and education ==
Graham was born in Washington, DC, on July 3, 1943, and grew up both at her family's Washington D.C. residence as well as the family's estate in Virginia. She was the eldest of the four children of Katharine Graham and Philip Graham, both of whom were publishers of The Post. Her maternal grandmother, Agnes Meyer, was a Lutheran of German ancestry. Her father, Philip (Phil) Leslie Graham, was born in Terry, South Dakota. The eldest of her three younger brothers is Donald E. Graham, who was the publisher of The Post from 1979 to 2000, a position held by Weymouth's daughter Katharine Weymouth from 2008 until 2014, the co-founder of Graham Holdings Company, which has Kaplan tutoring services and The Washington Post among its various subsidiaries.

Weymouth attended The Madeira School and graduated from Radcliffe College at Harvard University cum laude with a degree in American history and literature. Her father died by suicide in 1963 in the summer preceding her junior year at college.

== Career ==
From 1968 to 1969, Weymouth worked at the Bedford Stuyvesant Restoration Corporation.

Weymouth edited and compiled Thomas Jefferson: The Man, His World, His Influence (1973, G.P. Putnam), a collection which includes contributions from leading Jeffersonian scholars. She is the author of America in 1876, The Way We Were (1976, Random House). She worked as a freelance journalist and contributing editor from 1977 to 1983 for such publications as New York magazine, The New York Times Magazine, Esquire, Atlantic Monthly, and Parade. From 1983 to 1986 she was a contributing editor for the Los Angeles Times.

Weymouth later served as Senior Associate Editor of The Washington Post. She wrote on foreign affairs and conducted exclusive interviews with foreign heads of state from 1986 on. She is well known for having secured hard-to-get exclusive interviews with heads of state. Among her most famous interviews are her 1984 interview with Saddam Hussein, which was the first interview he granted an American journalist; her 2002 interview with Colonel Muammar Gaddafi in his tent in the Libyan Desert; in November 2002 she conducted an interview with the newly elected president of Brazil Luis Inacio Lula da Silva; and her 2007 interview with Pakistan's Prime Minister Benazir Bhutto two weeks before she was assassinated.

In 2006 Weymouth interviewed Iranian president Mahmoud Ahmadinejad, pressing him on his position that "Israel should be wiped off the face of the Earth." Despite his evasive responses, Weymouth pressed him until he said, "Are you asking me yes or no? Is this a test? Do you respect the right to self-determination for the Palestine nation? Yes or no?"

She also conducted exclusive interviews with Egyptian President Abdel Fatah al-Sissi and Hosni Mubarak; Jordan's King Abdullah II;, and Syria's Presidents Hafez al-Assad and Bashar al-Assad. She interviewed every Israeli Prime Minister from 1981, including Shimon Peres, Yitzhak Rabin, and, most recently, Benjamin Netanyahu. In 2022, she interviewed Ukraine's President Volodymyr Zelenskyy just before the war broke out.

In June 2017, Weymouth conducted the first foreign interview with South Korea's new President Moon Jae-in in Seoul to discuss the crisis in North Korea. In April, Weymouth interviewed Italy's new Prime Minister Paolo Gentiloni to discuss the flow of refugees into that country. Jordan's King Abdullah II also granted Mrs. Weymouth an interview in April and he discussed the Islamic State and the future of Syria. In March 2017, she travelled to Estonia to interview President Kersti Kaljulaid about the threat from Russia. She then went to Lithuania, where she interviewed President Dalia Grybauskaitė about the same topics. In January, Weymouth interviewed Masoud Barzani, President of the Kurdistan Region of Iraq, about the battle for Mosul. In December 2016, Lally Weymouth travelled to Peru to conduct an interview with Peru's President Pedro Pablo Kuczynski. In September 2016, she interviewed Colombia's President Manuel Santos and Italy's former Prime Minister Matteo Renzi.

Taiwan's President Tsai Ing-wen gave Weymouth her first interview after taking office in Taipei in July 2016. Brazil's president Michel Temer granted his first foreign interview to L Weymouth in June 2016. In November 2016, she travelled to Myanmar to interview Aung San Suu Kyi following her party's overwhelming victory in the country's elections.

== Personal life and death ==
In 1964, then a senior at Radcliffe, she married architect Yann Weymouth. They divorced in 1969. They had two daughters: Katharine Weymouth, publisher of the Washington Post from 2008 to 2013, and Pamela Alma Weymouth, a writer for Huffington Post.

Weymouth died from pancreatic cancer at her home in Manhattan, New York, on September 29, 2025, at the age of 82.

== Legacy ==
Weymouth was known for her prowess in the New York social scene. Attendance at her annual July Fourth party in Southampton was a prized invitation, with hundreds of attendees ranging from bank presidents to members of Congress. Weymouth would stand at the end of the receiving line, greeting each guest and allowing them to have a photo taken with her.

"To Lally, seating a dinner party was an act of seduction or an act of war. Were you about to be delighted by the company of such diverting dinner partners as media maestro Barry Diller and Watergate hero Carl Bernstein, or stun-gunned with boredom by an obscure cable company executive and some faceless white-shoe attorney?" -- Tina Brown

Weymouth was also known for running a "tight ship" in her home, once chastising a guest for eating a bagel outside of the dining room or not wearing a jacket and tie for a social visit.

After her death, Sally Quinn noted that "Lally was formidable. She knew exactly what she wanted and she knew how to get it."

== In popular culture ==
Weymouth was portrayed in the 2017 film The Post by Alison Brie.
