= Agnes E. Meyer =

American journalist

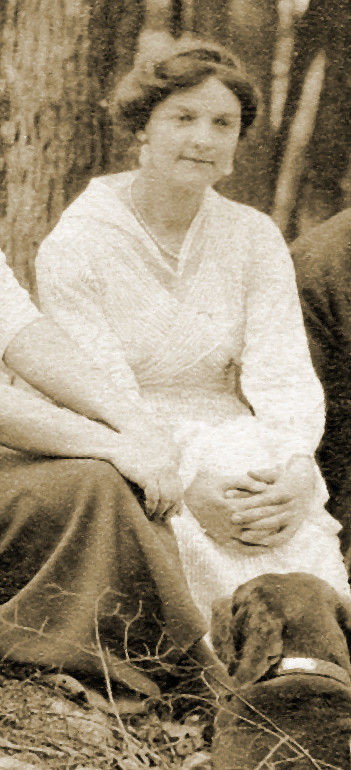
- Meyer (1912)
- Born: Agnes Elizabeth Ernst; January 2, 1887; New York City, U.S.
- Died: September 1, 1970 (aged 83); Mount Kisco, New York, U.S.
- Education: Sorbonne University
- Alma mater: Barnard College, Columbia University
- Occupations: Journalist, civil rights activist
- Spouse: Eugene Meyer (m. 1910; died 1959)
- Children: 5, including Florence Meyer and Katharine Graham

Agnes Elizabeth Ernst Meyer (née Ernst; January 2, 1887 – September 1, 1970) was an American journalist, philanthropist, civil rights activist, and art patron. Throughout her life, Meyer was engaged with intellectuals, artists, and writers from around the world. Meyer's marriage to the financier Eugene Meyer, son of Marc Eugene Meyer, provided her with wealth and status that enabled her to influence national policy, such as social welfare programs. Meyer lobbied for the creation of the Department of Health, Education and Welfare and for the U.S. government to provide federal aid to states for education. President Lyndon Johnson credited Meyer for building public support for the Elementary and Secondary Education Act of 1965, which for the first time directed federal assistance towards school districts that served children from low-income families. She advocated for equal employment and educational opportunities, regardless of race. Meyer's investigative journalism showed the inequities of racial segregation in schools in the Washington metropolitan area.

The purchase of The Washington Post in 1933 gave Meyer and her family the capacity to affect American opinion for several generations. Daughter Katharine Graham led the newspaper during the coverage of Watergate Investigation that eventually led to the resignation of President Richard Nixon and earned the paper a Pulitzer Prize. During Senator Joseph McCarthy's anti-Communist campaign in the 1950s, Meyer delivered speeches that characterized the campaign as a threat to academic freedom.

Meyer was an active patron and supporter of the arts, who with her husband contributed paintings by Paul Cézanne and Edouard Manet, sculptures by Constantin Brâncuși, and watercolors by John Marin to the National Gallery of Art in Washington.

== Early life and education ==
Meyer was born on January 2, 1887, in New York City to Frederic and Lucy Ernst, who were first-generation German Lutheran immigrants. As a girl, her family moved to Pelham Heights, which was then a rural village (now part of Pelham, N.Y.) in Westchester County. The family then moved back to the city, where Agnes went to Morris High School in The Bronx. As an adolescent, she clashed with her father about her ambitions. Ernst attended Barnard College over the objections of her father, getting her tuition from a scholarship and part-time jobs. She began cultivating lifelong friendships with intellectuals. Her interest in education and philosophy brought her under the spell of Columbia professor John Dewey, and they would both have a major effect on American public education in later decades. Ernst graduated from Barnard in 1907. then continued her studies at the Sorbonne in 1908–09, where she encountered Edward Steichen, Auguste Rodin, Constantin Brâncuși, and Gertrude and Leo Stein.

In 1908, Ernst met her future husband Eugene Meyer, who was 11 years her senior, in an art gallery in New York City. They married in 1910, exactly two years after Eugene Meyer encountered Ernst.

== Career and influence ==
=== Journalist and speaker ===
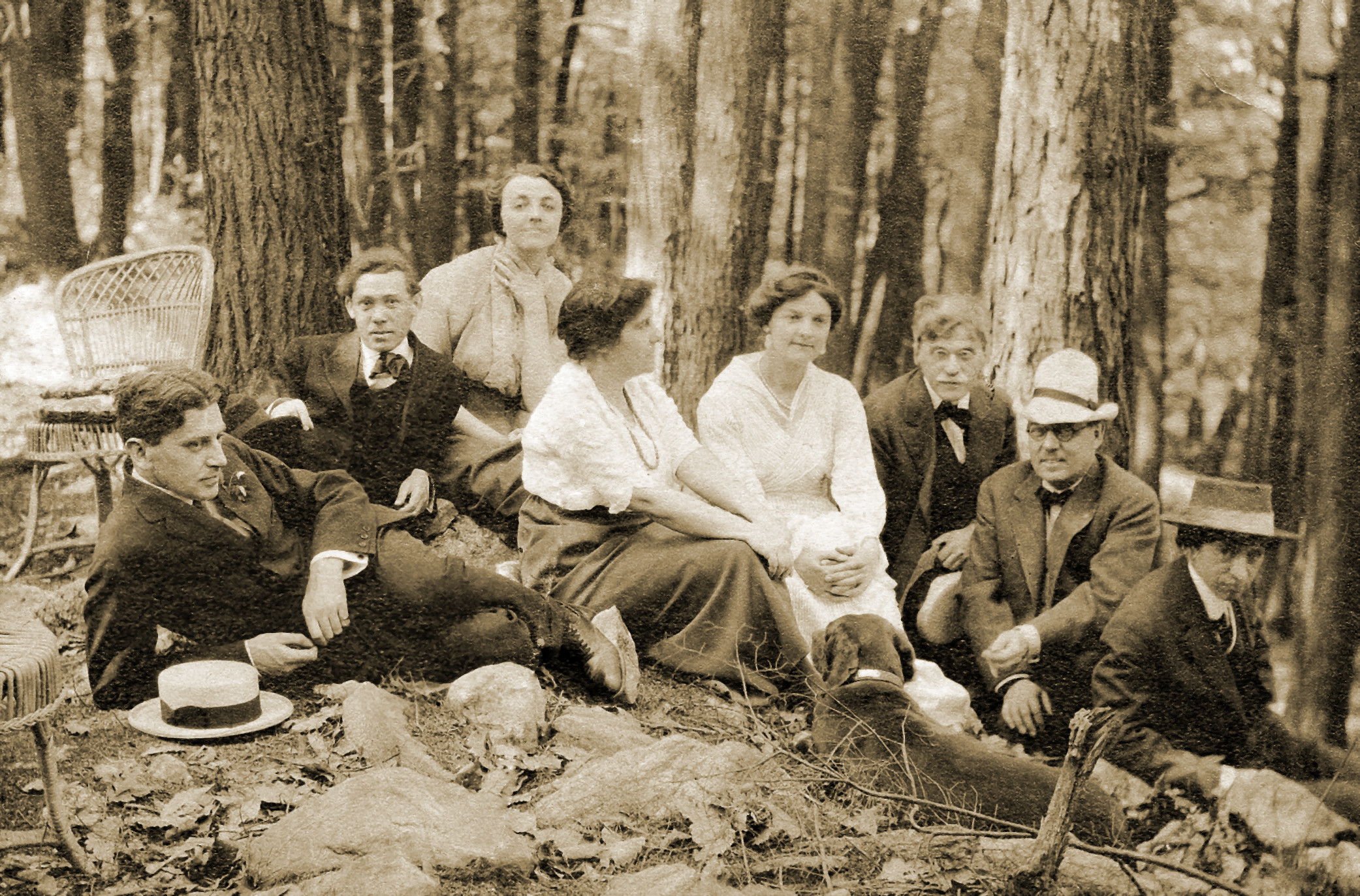
Left to right: Paul Haviland, Abraham Walkowitz, Katharine Rhoades, Emily Stieglitz, Agnes Meyer, Alfred Stieglitz, J. B. Kerfoot, John Marin

Shortly after graduating from Barnard, Meyer was hired by the old New York Sun as one of the newspaper's first woman journalists. Katharine Rhoades, Marion Beckett and Meyer were known as "The Three Graces" of the Alfred Stieglitz art circle.

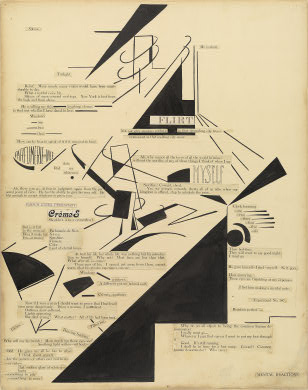
Marius de Zayas and Agnes Meyer, Mental Reactions, visual poetry, 1915

In 1915–1916, she created and published the literary art magazine 291 with Alfred Stieglitz, Marius de Zayas, and Paul Haviland. Its second issue featured a full-page printed version of Mental Reactions, the earliest example of visual poetry in America, in which Meyer's poem is cut into individually trimmed blocks of pasted-down text and strewn across the page. Her husband Eugene Meyer, after resigning as Chairman of the Federal Reserve in 1933, purchased the bankrupt Washington Post, to which Agnes frequently contributed articles about the problems of veterans, migrant workers, overcrowded schools, and African Americans. After World War II, she wrote Out of These Roots: The Autobiography of An American Woman.

In June 1945, Meyer authored a five-part series for the Washington Post titled "Orderly Revolution." It was a glowing tribute to a young Saul Alinsky, who was then an obscure community organizer in Chicago. He was also a frequent visitor to the home of the Meyers in Washington, and to their estate in Westchester.

During Senator Joseph McCarthy's anti-Communist campaign in the 1950s, Meyer delivered speeches that characterized the campaign as a threat to academic freedom. She spoke at the convention of the American Association of School Administrators in Atlantic City, New Jersey, calling his behavior an affront to the dignity of a free people. Speaking at the Barnard Forum, Meyer argued that "security is not an aim in itself," that without freedom it "reduces life to that of the prison." Her gender politics were more traditionalist and typical of the decade, however, seen when she wrote an article for the Atlantic Monthly in which she asserted "Women have many careers but only one vocation – motherhood. . . . Women must boldly announce that no job is more exacting, more necessary, or more rewarding than that of housewife and mother. Then they will feel free to become once more the moral force of society through the stabilization of the home."

Meyer's investigative journalism showed the inequities of racial segregation in the Washington metropolitan area schools. President Lyndon Johnson credited Meyer for building public support for the Elementary and Secondary Education Act of 1965, which for the first time directed federal assistance towards school districts that served children from low-income families.

=== Civil rights activist ===
Meyer lobbied for integration of public schools and an end to racial discrimination in employment. Meyer advocated for the creation of the Department of Health, Education and Welfare and the United States government providing federal aid to states for education. Lyndon B. Johnson credited her with having the most influence over his education policies.

On November 17, 1956, Agnes E. Meyer addressed the National Council of Negro Women in Washington D.C.

Throughout the 1960s she continued to dedicate her time to improving public education through the creation and financial support of several not-for profit organizations.

=== Philanthropy ===
In 1944, with her husband she created the Eugene and Agnes E. Meyer Foundation to provide funding for civic activities, particularly those related to improving public education.

In 1958, Meyer with her husband co-founded the Agnes and Eugene Meyer Fund to provide support for professors of her Alma mater, Barnard College and provided funding to the New School for Social Research. The next year, she founded the Urban Service Corps a program to offer mentoring to school children in Washington D.C. In 1960. Meyer founded the National Committee for the Support of the Public Schools and was the chairwoman until her death.

=== Art patronage ===
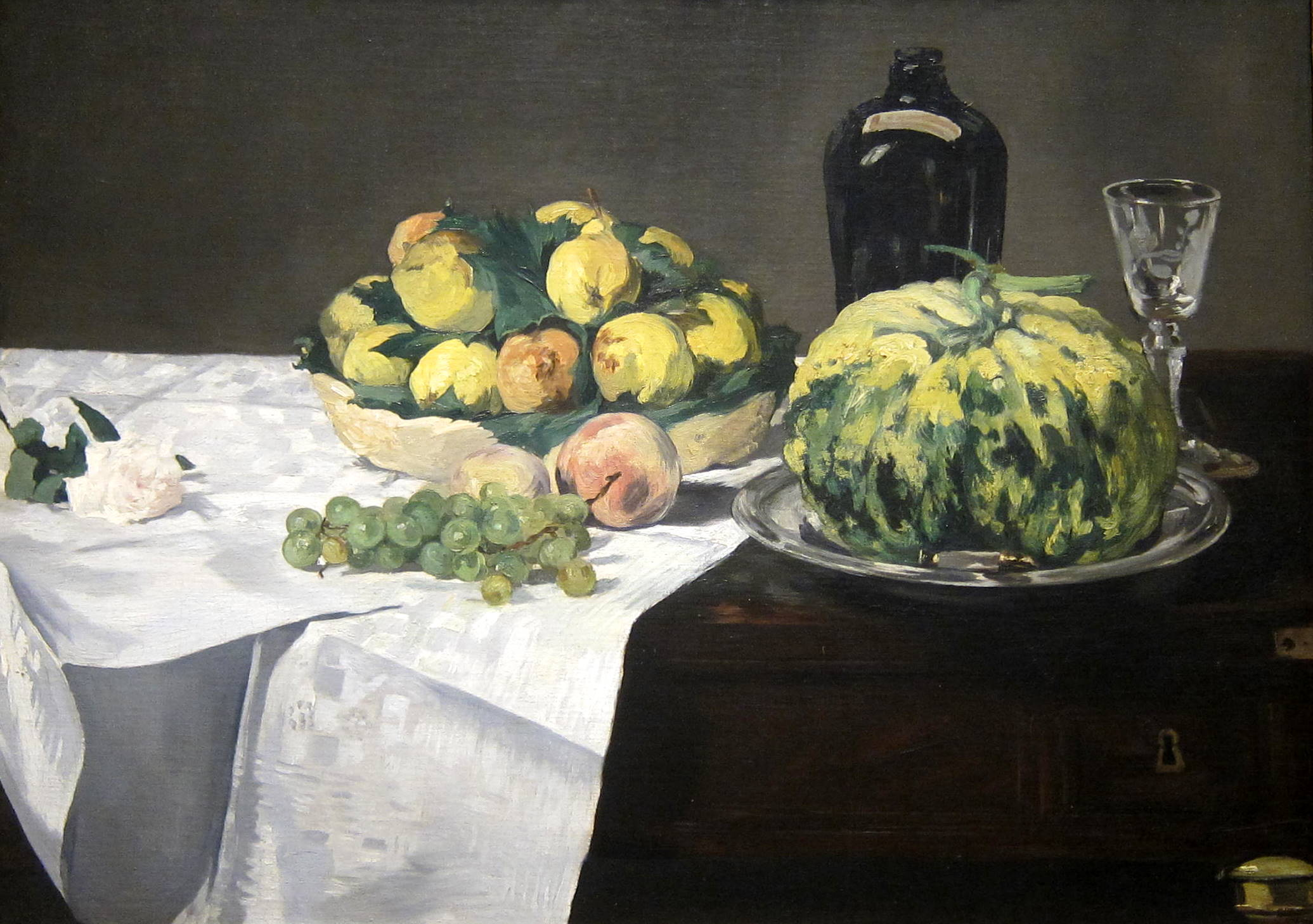
Édouard Manet, Still Life with Melon and Peaches, oil on canvas, 1866, National Gallery of Art

Meyer met Charles Lang Freer, the Detroit industrialist and collector in 1913 at a Chinese painting exhibition. Over the years, together they studied and collected Chinese and other Asian art. When Freer died before the Freer Gallery of Art was completed, Meyer and her husband took over making the final decisions. During the 1993 renovation of the Gallery, the Eugene and Agnes E. Meyer Auditorium was remodeled and dedicated to them.

The Meyer family contributed paintings by Paul Cézanne and Édouard Manet, sculptures by Constantin Brâncuși, and watercolors by John Marin to the National Gallery of Art.

== Personal life ==
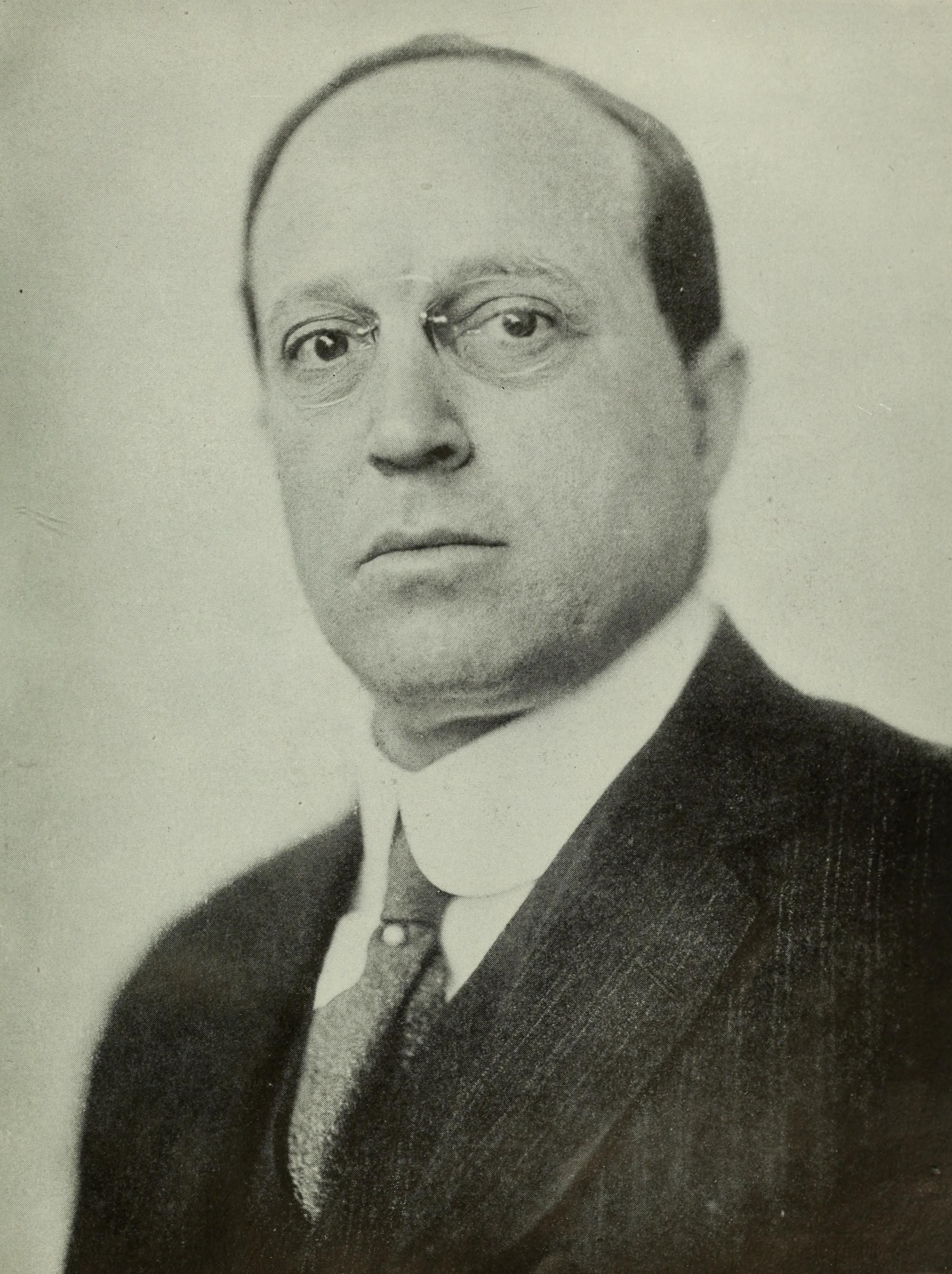
Portrait of Eugene Meyer

She returned to the United States from Paris in 1910 and married Eugene in a small Lutheran wedding. At that time, Eugene was established in his career as an investment banker and was financially well off.

Meyer and Eugene had five children together. Their oldest daughter Florence Meyer (1911–1962) was a photographer and married to actor Oskar Homolka. Elizabeth Meyer Lorentz (1913–2001) was an author who was married to Pare Lorentz. Eugene "Bill" Meyer III (1915–1982) was a physician and medical professor. Katharine Graham (1917–2001) was the publisher of The Washington Post. Ruth Meyer (1921–2007) married William A. Epstein.

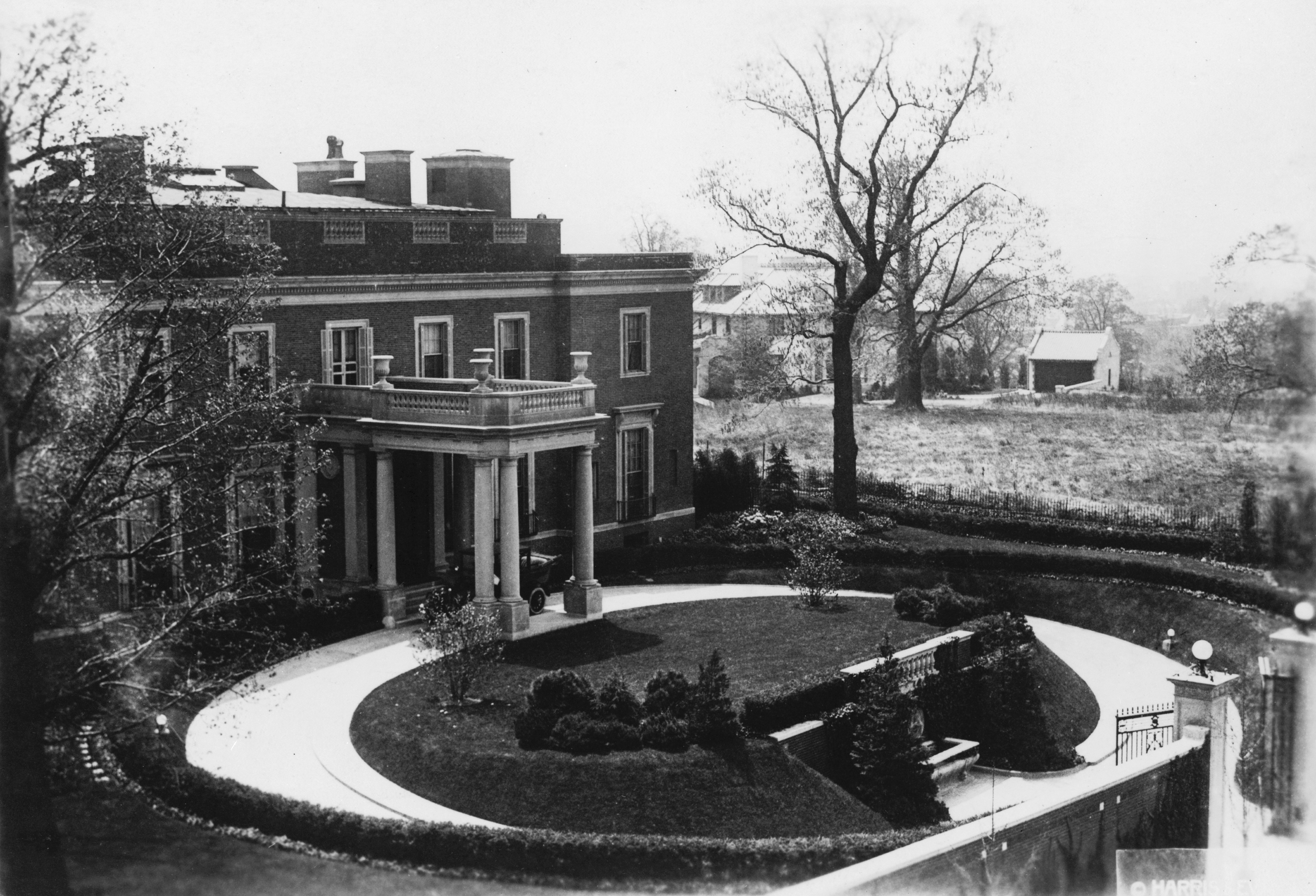
White-Meyer House on Crescent Place, Washington, D.C.

In 1917, the Meyers relocated to Washington, D.C., and for the next sixteen years Eugene had a series of positions within the federal government, including Chairman of the Federal Reserve (1930–33). Eugene and Agnes Meyer lived in the Meridian Hill Park section of Washington. The Meyer family first leased, in 1929, and then bought, in 1934, property on Crescent Place. The property, now known as the White-Meyer House, is on the National Register.

In 1919, the Meyers built a mansion on the Seven Springs Farm in Westchester County, New York. The house had over 60 rooms, two wings for servants, 15 bedrooms, and three pools, including an indoor pool cased in white marble from Italy. The estate overlooks Byram Lake, and is at the point where the towns of North Castle, New Castle and Bedford meet.

Meyer was chairwoman of the Westchester County Recreation Commission for eighteen years (1923–1941).

Meyer had a twenty-year-long friendship with Thomas Mann She helped to create an active social life for him during his exile to the United States, by introducing him into elite social circles in New York and Washington. In 1938, she secured a position as lecturer in the humanities for him at Princeton University.

== Death and legacy ==
At the age of 83, Meyer died of cancer at Seven Springs Farm.

While living, Meyer was honored by receiving 14 honorary degrees, and awards from the Women's National Press Club, National Association for the Advancement of Colored People (NAACP), AFL–CIO, and National Conference of Christians and Jews. After Meyer's death, the Eugene and Agnes E. Meyer Foundation donated Seven Springs Estate to Yale University. Later it was incorporated as a nonprofit conference center. In 1984 the property went to Rockefeller University, which continued to use it as a conference center.

The Washington Post established the Agnes Meyer Outstanding Teacher Award in 1983 to recognize exceptional teachers. More than 500 teachers in the Metropolitan Washington area have received this honor in her name.

The Library of Congress holds the Agnes Elizabeth Ernst Meyer Papers which includes her diaries, correspondence with family, friends, and her career as an author and social activist, her speeches, and an unpublished manuscript for a memoir.

== Bibliography ==
- Chinese Painting: As Reflected in the Thought and Art of Li Lung-Mein, 1070–1106 (New York, 1923).
- Journey Through Chaos (New York, 1944).
- Out of These Roots: The Autobiography of an American Woman (Boston, 1953).
