= Marion H. Beckett =

American painter (1886–1949)

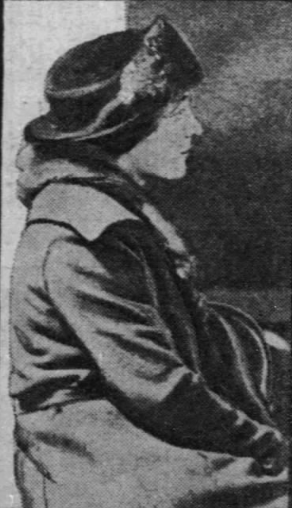
- Marion H. Beckett, 1921
- Born: February 7, 1886; New York, New York
- Died: 1949 (aged 62–63)
- Resting place: Williamstown, Vermont
- Known for: Portrait paintings

Marion Hasbrouck Beckett (February 7, 1886 – 1949) was an American painter.

== Early life and education ==
Beckett was born in New York on February 7, 1886. Her parents were Charles Henry Beckett, originally from Williamstown, Vermont, and Estelle Josephine (Newman) Beckett of Watkins, New York. She was left with a large fortune following her father's death on November 29, 1917. She was Charles and Estelle's only child.

She exhibited a number of paintings at the Annual Philadelphia Water Color Exhibition in 1908. In 1908, Beckett traveled to Paris with Katharine Rhoades and Malvina Hoffman and studied in France for two years. Rhoades had been her friend since 1904 when Rhoades made her debut in New York City. The family was on the Social Register in New York.

== Career ==
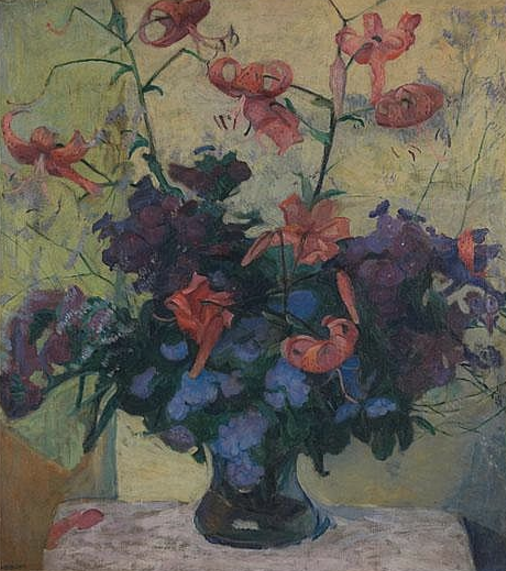
Marion H. Beckett, Still Life, ca. 1920

A member of Alfred Stieglitz’s artistic circle in New York City, Beckett was known primarily as a portrait painter. Her Portrait of Mrs. Charles H. Beckett and Portrait of Mrs. Eduard J. Steichen were exhibited in the 1913 Armory Show. In 1915, Beckett and Rhodes had a joint exhibition at Stieglitz’s 291 Gallery. Prior to that, the only works of a female non-photographer that Stieglitz exhibited were that of Pamela Colman Smith in 1907. Marion Beckett and her friends Katharine Rhoades and Agnes Ernst Meyer were known as the "Three Graces" of 291, an accolade bestowed by Charles Lang Freer. Agnes Ernst Meyer described Marion as one of "the most beautiful young women that ever walked this earth". She was also described as shy and reserved.

In January 1917, Beckett presented a show of portraits at Marius de Zayas's Modern Gallery. Among the portraits were one that she made of herself, one of her father, Alfred Stieglitz, and Eugene Meyer. A Beckett portrait of Georgia O'Keeffe, made in 1916, was chosen to illustrate a Vanity Fair article in 1922 and a New York Sun article about O'Keeffe's work in 1923. It was also the lead portrait of Beckett's show, which also included a portrait of Katharine Rhoades, in New York at Montross Gallery in January 1925.

In the 1920s, she was the president and a director of the Beckett Water Supply Company. Estelle Beckett was vice-president and a director.

Beckett stopped painting about 1926. Fifteen of her paintings were stored by family members until 1997, including the portraits of O'Keeffe and Agnes Meyers.

== Personal life ==
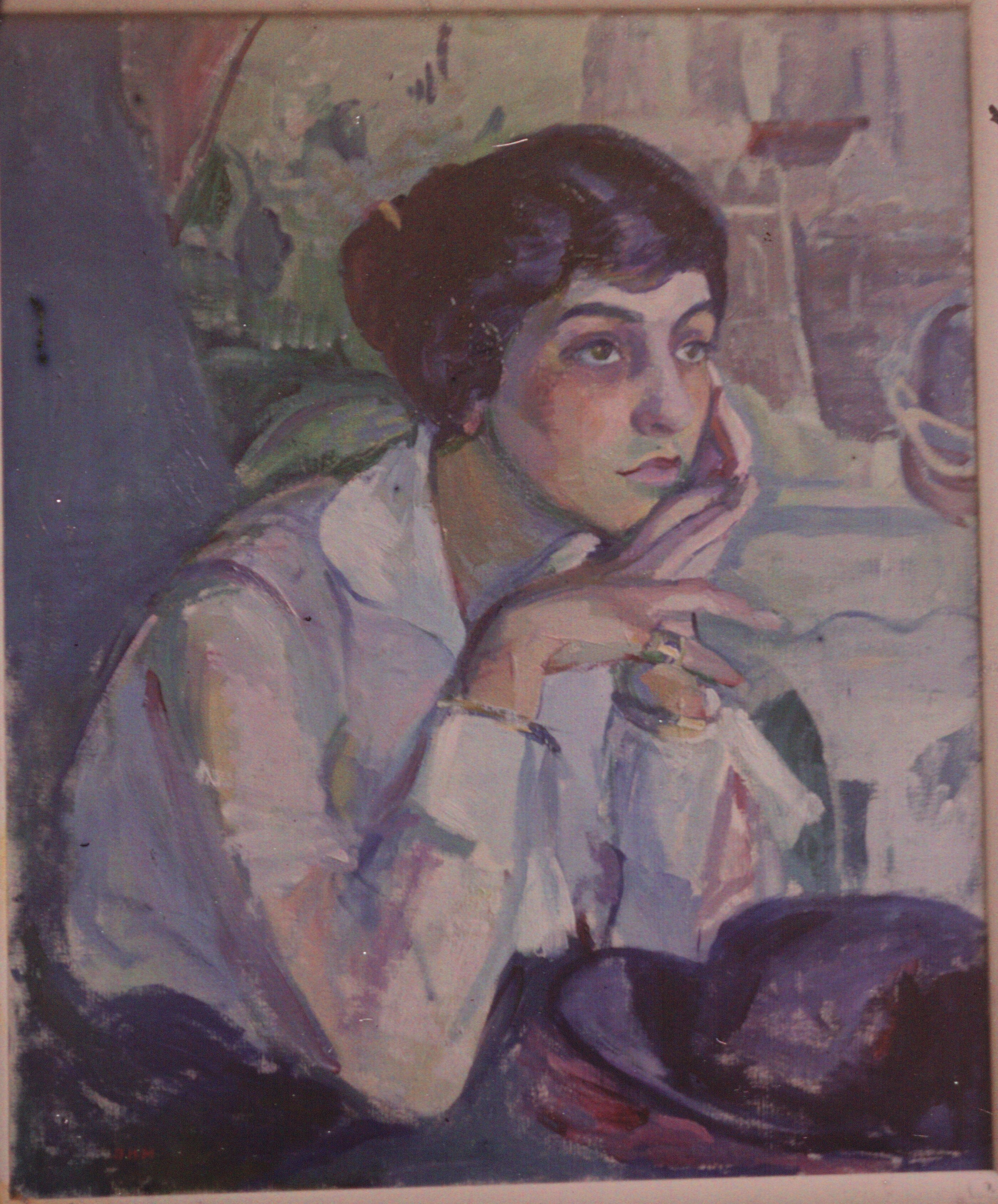
Marion H. Beckett, Portrait of Mrs. Eduard J. Steichen

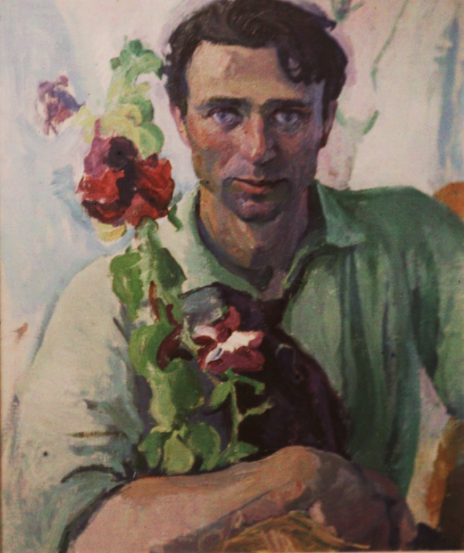
Marion H. Beckett, Eduard J. Steichen, 1915

Beckett often traveled to Voulangis, France with Agnes Meyer and Katharine Rhoades to visit artist Edward Steichen and his wife and paint portraits. She was the sole guest at their house at the beginning of World War I in 1914, when Germans soldiers were advancing towards the town. They were able to evacuate two days before the Germans arrived at the Steichen's house. In 1917, she worked as a canteen worker for the Red Cross in France, and it was during this time period that she is believed to have begun an affair with Steichen.

By 1919, Beckett established a studio in the Latin Quarter of Paris, where she entertained Steichen. They were believed to have traveled together from France to New York and Vermont, where her mother lived. In 1919, Clara Steichen sued Marion Beckett for $200,000 damages for "Alienation of affections", claiming that Marion had followed her husband to France and had an affair. Clara was unable to prove her claims. It was reported that Beckett had a ten-year affair with Steichen, until about 1926 when she stopped painting.

By 1926, she had an adopted son and daughter. She spent the summers in a house in Williamstown, Vermont and was living in New York City in 1930.
