= Terry, South Dakota =

Unincorporated community in South Dakota, US

Coordinates: 44°20′01″N 103°49′01″W

Terry is an unincorporated community in Lawrence County, South Dakota, United States.

== History ==
The Black Hills are home to many gold deposits. The gold around Terry was non free milling, or visible to the eye, and required more processing to be viable. In the 1880s, a smelting and chlorination plant was built in nearby Deadwood and miners moved to what became Terry. The town was home to the Golden Reward mine, which was created 1887 to take advantage of the advances in gold ore processing. A spur of the Deadwood Central Railroad was built to serve the mines and ran from 1890/1891 to 1918.

A post office called Terry was established in 1892, and remained in operation until it was discontinued in 1929. The community took its name from nearby Terry Peak. The town had its peak between 1900 and 1910, with almost 1,200 residents. The town was built organically along the sides of the gulch.

Martha Jane Cannary, the frontierswoman better known as Calamity Jane, died in Terry on Saturday, August 1, 1903, from inflammation of the bowels and pneumonia, at the age of 51. Philip Graham, husband of Katherine Graham and former publisher of the Washington Post was born in Terry.

The area which the town sat on is privately owned by the Coeur Mining company, which also owns the nearby Wharf Mine, and is currently closed off to the public.
