= Personal History =

Autobiography by Katharine Graham

- Author: Katharine Graham
- Language: English
- Genre: Autobiography
- Publication date: 1997
- Publication place: United States

Personal History is the 1997 autobiography of Washington Post publisher Katharine Graham. It won the 1998 Pulitzer Prize for Biography or Autobiography, and received widespread critical acclaim for its candour in dealing with her husband's mental illness and the challenges she faced in a male-dominated working environment.

== Themes ==
The main themes of the book include:

- Graham's complex and often difficult relationship with her mother;
- her family's involvement with The Washington Post from 1933 onwards;
- her relationship with her husband Philip Graham;
- Graham and Phil's relationships with John F. Kennedy and Lyndon B. Johnson, especially Johnson's appointment as Kennedy's running-mate;
- Philip's mental illness and eventual suicide;
- Graham's evolution from a housewife to the chairman of a major publishing company;
- her growing awareness of feminist issues;
- the legal battle over the Pentagon Papers;
- The Post's coverage of Watergate; and
- her relationship to the labor movement, first as an activist, then as a reporter, then with the strikes at the Post, most notably the 1975–1976 pressmen's strike.
