= John W. Sweeterman =

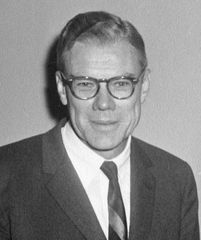
- Sweeterman in 1961
- Born: March 31, 1907; Celina, Ohio
- Died: April 3, 1998 (aged 91); Chevy Chase, Maryland
- Occupation: Publisher

John William Sweeterman (1907–1998) was an American newspaperman who was publisher of The Washington Post from 1961 to 1968, and who helped engineer the Post's 1954 acquisition of the Washington Times-Herald, which improved the Post's struggling financial situation.

Born in Celina, Ohio, he attended the University of Dayton and started at the Dayton Journal-Herald as an office boy, eventually becoming the vice president and general manager. He moved to Washington, D.C., in 1950 to work for the Post where he became business manager and then general manager under owner and publisher Phil Graham.

Sweeterman became publisher in 1961 until his retirement in 1968, when he persuaded then owner Katharine Graham to take over the role of publisher. He served as vice chairman of the Washington Post Company from 1968 to 1971.

He also was a director of the American Security and Trust Company and president of the Community Welfare Council. He received an honorary degree from Saint Joseph's College, Indiana, in 1969.

Media offices
Preceded by Phil Graham	Publisher of "The Washington Post"; 1961- 1968	Succeeded by Katharine Graham
