= Yann Weymouth =

American architect

- Born: December 1941 (age 84)
- Spouses: Lally Graham (m. 1963; div. 1969) Susana Pola (m. 1988)
- Children: 3, including Katharine Weymouth
- Parents: Ralph Weymouth (father); Laure Bouchage (mother)
- Family: Tina Weymouth (sister); Anatole Le Braz (great-grandfather)

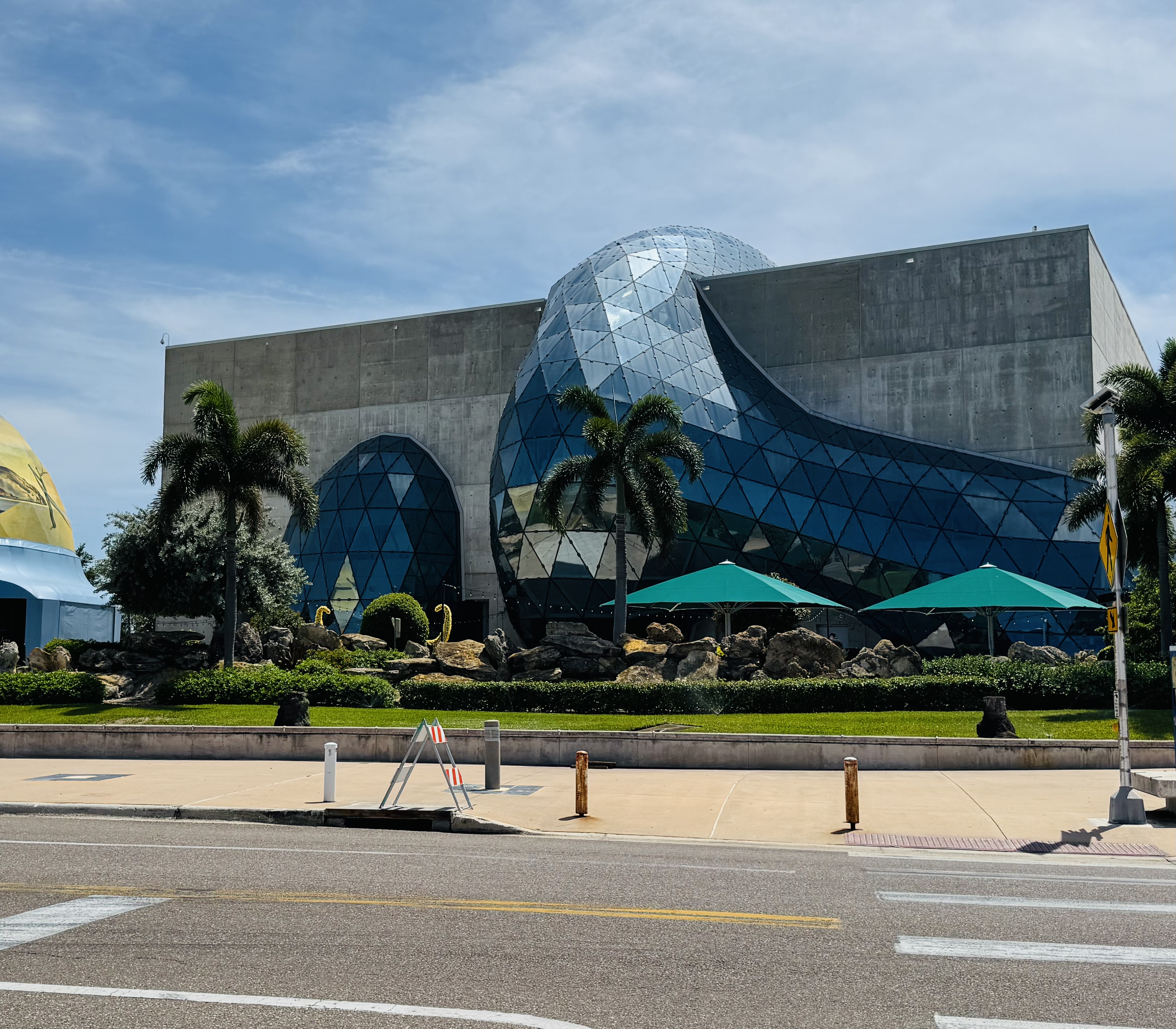
The Salvador Dalí Museum, St. Petersburg, Florida, designed by Weymouth

Yann Weymouth (born December 1941) is an American architect and the designer of the Salvador Dalí Museum. Early in his career, he served as chief of design for I. M. Pei on the Grand Louvre Project in Paris.

== Career ==
After graduating from Harvard University in 1963 and MIT School of Architecture in 1966, Weymouth worked as chief of design for I.M. Pei on the National Gallery of Art East Wing, Washington, D.C and as the chief of design for I.M. Pei on the Grand Louvre Project in Paris.

In 1989, the year the Grand Louvre Pyramid opened, Engineering News-Record named Weymouth one of its Men of the Year. French President François Mitterrand honored Weymouth for his role, awarding him the “Chevalier” (Knight) of the “Ordre National du Mérite”. Weymouth was elevated to “Officier” (Officer) in 2012.

Weymouth then worked for Arup, SOM and Arquitectonica. From early 2001 to 2013, Weymouth served as senior vice president, design director, and worldwide design board member for Hellmuth Obata + Kassabaum (HOK) Architects. He cited HOK's "commitment to sustainable design" as his reason for joining the firm.

Weymouth designed The Phillip and Patricia Frost School of Experiential Music at the University of Miami in Florida, intended to be the first LEED Platinum structures at the university. He designed the Salvador Dalí Museum in Florida.

Weymouth designed expansions, renovations and master plan of the John and Mable Ringling Museum of Art and Cultural Complex in Sarasota and the Museum of Fine Arts (St. Petersburg, Florida) Hazel Hough Wing.

== Louvre Notebooks ==
Weymouth has kept notebooks of his work on the Louvre. In 1992, the American Institute of Architects and American Architectural Foundation exhibited Yann Weymouth Louvre Notebooks at The Octagon House in Washington, D.C. In 2009, to mark the 20th anniversary of the opening of the Louvre Pyramid, the Musee du Louvre and Prestel co-published the book I.M. Pei and the Louvre Pyramid by Philip Jodidio and with sketches by Weymouth.

== Personal life ==
Weymouth is the older brother of Tina Weymouth, the bassist for the art-rock band Talking Heads from 1974 to 1991, the son of Ralph Weymouth and the great-grandson of Anatole Le Braz. His mother was an immigrant from France of Breton descent and his father was American.

Weymouth married journalist and editor Lally Graham in 1963; they divorced in 1969. They had two children: Katharine, who was the publisher for The Washington Post, and Pamela, a former writer for HuffPost. In 1988, Weymouth married Susana Pola; they have a son, Wells Weymouth.
