= Becoming Katharine Graham =

2025 documentary film

Becoming Katharine Graham is a 2025 documentary film about the life of Washington Post publisher Katharine Graham.
