= Ralph Weymouth =

American Navy Vice Admiral (1917–2020)

- Born: May 26, 1917; Seattle, Washington, U.S.
- Died: January 22, 2020 (aged 102); Rockport, Maine, U.S.
- Alma mater: United States Naval Academy
- Spouse(s): Laure Bouchage (m. 1940; died 2009); Diana Beliard (m. 2012; died 2018)
- Children: 8, including Yann Weymouth and Tina Weymouth
- Military career
- Allegiance: United States
- Branch: United States Navy
- Service years: 1938–1973
- Rank: Vice Admiral
- Conflicts: World War II; Pacific War; Korean War; Vietnam War
- Awards: Navy Cross; Legion of Merit (2); Distinguished Flying Cross (4)

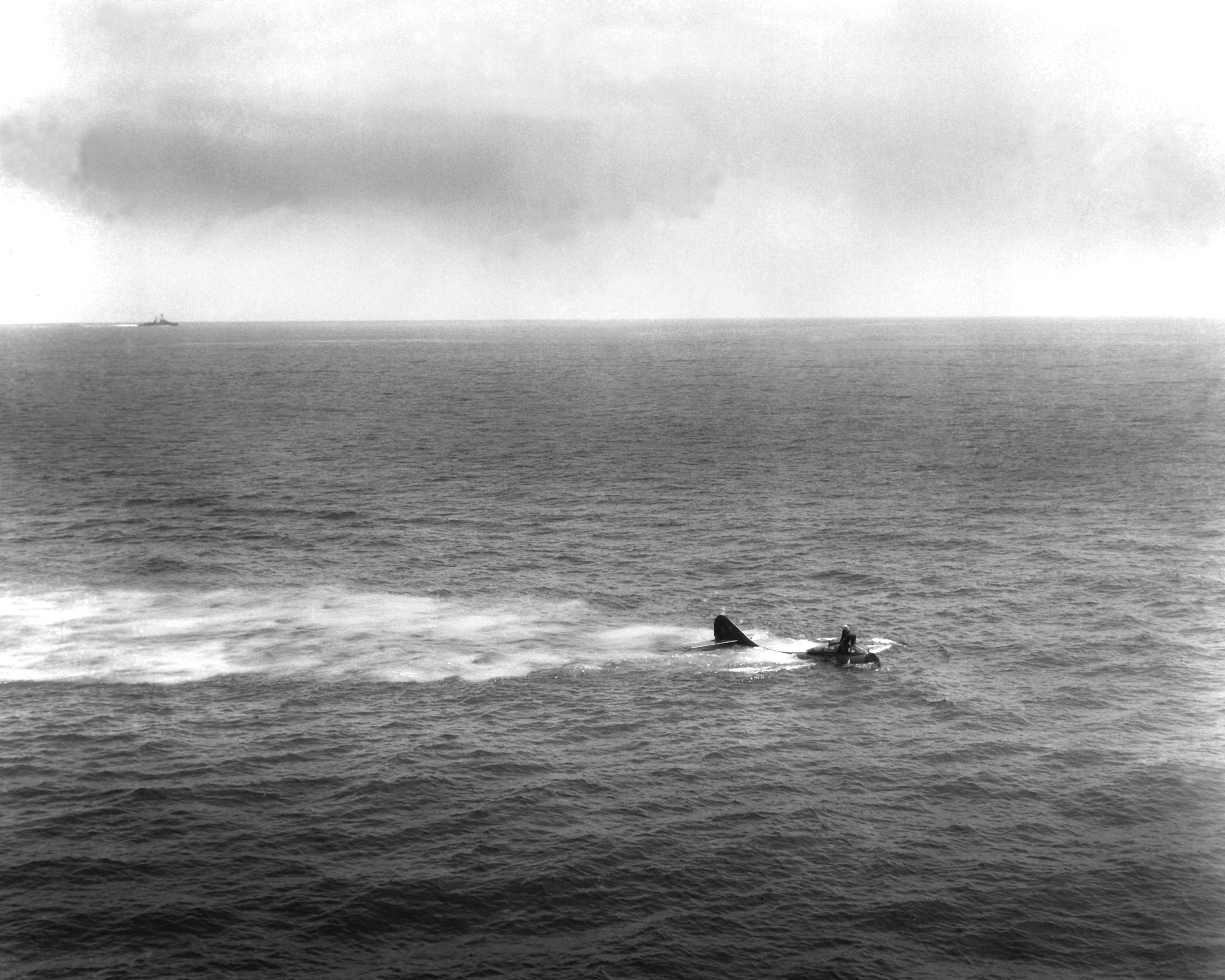
Weymouth following 1950 crash of his Grumman F9F Panther

Ralph Weymouth (May 26, 1917 – January 22, 2020) was an American decorated Vice Admiral of the United States Navy and anti-nuclear campaigner.

Weymouth was born in Seattle to Ralph Wells Weymouth and his wife Lisbeth Cunningham Sewall. He graduated from the U.S. Naval Academy in 1938, served two years on surface ships, began naval aviator training, and earned his wings in 1941. One of his classmates was Norman Kleiss.

During World War II while serving as Commanding Officer of Bombing Squadron 16 (VB-16) on the USS Lexington, he received the Navy Cross for actions against the Japanese Navy in the Battle of the Philippine Sea. He was also awarded the Legion of Merit twice and the Distinguished Flying Cross four times. His service continued through the Korean and Vietnam Wars.

During service in post-war Japan, Weymouth became concerned at the effects of nuclear war on the inhabitants of Nagasaki and Hiroshima and became an opponent of nuclear weapons, becoming more active in retirement.

He married Laure Bouchage, of Breton descent, granddaughter of Anatole Le Braz, in 1940, and they had eight children, including Tina Weymouth, former bassist for Talking Heads and currently with Tom Tom Club, and architect Yann Weymouth. At 94, he married his neighbor, Diana, who died in 2018, making him a widower twice over.

Weymouth died at age 102 in Rockport, Maine, on January 22, 2020.
