= Phil Graham =

American newspaper publisher (1915–1963)

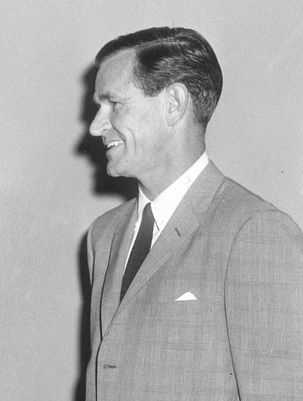
- Graham in 1961
- Born: Philip Leslie Graham; July 18, 1915; Terry, South Dakota, U.S.
- Died: August 3, 1963 (aged 48); Marshall, Virginia, U.S.
- Resting place: Oak Hill Cemetery; Washington, D.C., U.S.
- Education: University of Florida (BA); Harvard University (LLB)
- Occupation: Newspaper publisher
- Spouse: Katharine Graham (m. 1940)
- Children: 5, including Lally and Donald
- Relatives: Bob Graham (half-brother)

Philip Leslie Graham (July 18, 1915 – August 3, 1963) was an American newspaperman. He served as publisher and later co-owner of The Washington Post and its parent company, The Washington Post Company.

During his years with the Post Company, Graham helped The Washington Post grow from a struggling local paper to a national publication and the Post Company expand to own other newspapers as well as radio and television stations. He was married to Katharine Graham, a daughter of Eugene Meyer, the previous owner of The Washington Post.

Graham, who had bipolar disorder, died by suicide in 1963, after which Katharine took over as publisher, making her one of the first women in charge of a major American newspaper.

== Early life and education ==
Graham was born to a Lutheran family in Terry, South Dakota. He was raised in Miami where his father, Ernest R. ("Cap") Graham, made a career in farming and real estate, and was elected to the State Senate. His mother, the former Florence Morris, had been a schoolteacher in the Black Hills of South Dakota. Graham was one of four children. One half brother, Bob Graham, was a former governor of the state of Florida (1979–1987) and a former United States Senator representing Florida from 1987 to 2005.

Graham attended Miami High School and graduated from the University of Florida in 1936, with a Bachelor of Arts degree in economics, and from Harvard Law School, where he was editor of the Harvard Law Review and earned a magna cum laude degree, in 1939. Graham was a member of both Florida Blue Key and Sigma Alpha Epsilon (Florida Upsilon chapter) and was both a fraternity brother and roommate of the late Senator George A. Smathers whom he had been close to since attending Miami High School together. In 1939–1940 he was law clerk to United States Supreme Court Justice Stanley F. Reed, and the following year he was clerk to Justice Felix Frankfurter, who had been one of his professors at Harvard.

During World War II, Graham enlisted in the United States Army Air Forces as a private in 1942 and rose to the rank of major by war's end. He worked as an assistant to William Donovan, head of the Office of Strategic Services (OSS). In 1944 Graham was recruited into the "Special Branch, a super-secret part of Intelligence, run by Colonel Al McCormick". He later worked under General George Kenney, commander of the Allied Air Forces in the Southwest Pacific. His wife followed him on military assignments to Sioux Falls, South Dakota and Harrisburg, Pennsylvania up until 1945, when he went to the Pacific theater as an intelligence officer of the Far East Air Force, which was created in August 1944.

== Career at The Washington Post Company ==
In 1946, when his father-in-law, Washington Post publisher Eugene Meyer, was named the first president of the World Bank, he passed the position of publisher to Graham. When Meyer left the World Bank later that year, he took the title of chairman of the board of the Washington Post Company, leaving Graham as publisher.

In 1948, Meyer transferred his actual control of the Post Company stock (the company was privately owned) to his daughter and her husband. Katharine Graham received 30 percent as a gift. Phil received 70 percent of the stock, his purchase financed by his father-in-law. Meyer remained a close adviser to his son-in-law until his death in 1959, at which time Graham assumed the titles of President and Chairman of the Board of the Post company.

=== Leadership of company under Graham ===
- In 1949, the Post Company purchased a controlling ownership interest in Washington radio station WTOP, jointly owned with CBS. This marked the beginnings of the Post Company's involvement in broadcasting. The following year the Post/CBS joint venture bought the CBS-affiliated television station in Washington, and changed the call letters to WTOP-TV (later WDVM-TV, and now WUSA-TV), and in 1953 the company bought WMBR radio and WMBR-TV (now WJXT) in Jacksonville, Florida. The company gained full ownership of the WTOP stations in 1954.
- In 1954, the Post Company bought the competing morning newspaper, the Times-Herald, for $8.5 million. The Post kept most of the Times-Herald's advertising, features, columnists and comics — and most of its readers. It immediately jumped ahead of the Evening Star, the city's prominent afternoon paper, in circulation, and in 1959, it passed the Star in advertising linage.
- In 1961, the Post Company purchased the controlling stock interest in Newsweek from the Vincent Astor Foundation. When the deal was closed in New York City, Graham wrote a check for $2,000,000 as a down payment on the $8,985,000 purchase price.
- In 1962, the Post Company again expanded into the magazine field by buying Art News, the most widely read monthly in the art field, and Portfolio, a hard-cover art quarterly, from Albert M. Frankfurter.

== Involvement in politics ==
While running the Washington Post and other parts of the Post Company, Graham played a backstage role in national and local politics. Graham was part of the informal but influential Georgetown Set of Cold War liberals.

In 1954, Graham was the leading force behind the founding of the Federal City Council, a highly influential group of business, civic, education, and other leaders interested in economic development in Washington, D.C.

In 1960, he helped persuade his friend John F. Kennedy to take Lyndon Johnson on his ticket as the vice presidential candidate, talking frequently to both during the 1960 Democratic National Convention in Los Angeles, California. During the 1960 campaign, he wrote the drafts for several speeches that Johnson gave. After Kennedy and Johnson were elected in November, he successfully lobbied for the appointment of Douglas Dillon as Secretary of the Treasury, and frequently discussed other appointments with Kennedy. In the years after Kennedy's inauguration, he wrote occasional drafts of speeches, primarily for Johnson, but also for the President and for Robert F. Kennedy.

In 1961, Kennedy named Graham to serve as an incorporator for the Communications Satellite Corporation, known as COMSAT, a joint venture between the private sector and government for satellite communications. In October 1961, he was appointed chairman of the group.

== Mental health problems and death ==
In Katharine Graham's book Personal History, she notes that her husband was always intense and spontaneous, but occasionally lapsed into periods of depression. In 1957, he had a severe manic episode and, at the time, no medicines were available for effective treatment. He retired to the couple's farm in Marshall, Virginia, to recuperate. Thereafter, periods in which he functioned brilliantly alternated with periods in which he was morose and erratic and isolated himself. He often drank heavily (something he had done prior to 1957), and would become extremely argumentative and blunt.

Through the Post Company's Newsweek arm, Graham eventually met Australian journalist Robin Webb, and in 1962 they began an affair. In 1963, he and Webb flew to Arizona; he appeared at a newspaper publishing convention inebriated and/or manic. At the microphone he made a number of provocative comments, including the revelation that President Kennedy was sleeping with Mary Pinchot Meyer. His assistant, James Truitt, called for his doctor, Leslie Farber, who flew in by private jet, as did (subsequently) Graham's wife. Graham was sedated, bound in a straitjacket, and flown back to Washington. He was committed for five days to Chestnut Lodge, a psychiatric hospital in Rockville, Maryland.

Graham then left his wife for Robin Webb, announced to his friends that he planned to divorce his wife and immediately remarry, and indicated that he wanted to purchase sole control of the Post Company. In June, in a fit of depression, he broke off his affair and returned home. On June 20, 1963, he entered Chestnut Lodge for the second time, and was formally diagnosed with manic depression (now called bipolar disorder). He was treated with psychotherapy.

Graham later made repeated requests of his doctors to be allowed a short stay away from the hospital, and was "quite noticeably much better", according to his wife. On August 3, 1963, he was permitted to go to their farmhouse in Virginia, Glen Welby, for the weekend. There, Graham killed himself with a shotgun while his wife was in another part of the retreat. His body was found in a bathroom about 1:00 pm. He was buried at Oak Hill Cemetery in Washington, D.C.

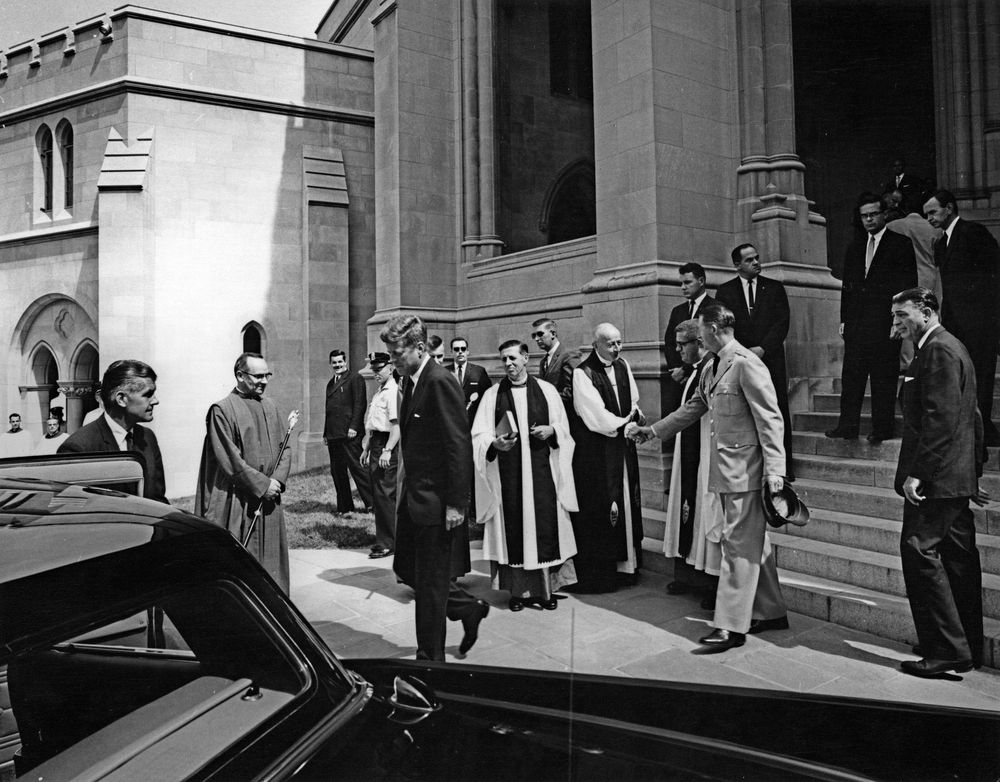
Graham's funeral was attended by President John F. Kennedy

During probate, Katharine Graham's lawyer challenged the legality of her husband's last will, written in 1963 in favor of his mistress. Edward Bennett Williams testified that Graham had not been of sound mind when he had instructed Williams to draw up his final will. Williams said that he had, at the same time he prepared the will, written a memorandum for the file stating that Graham was mentally ill, and that he was preparing the will at Graham's direction only to maintain their relationship. The judge in the case ruled that Graham had died intestate. A compromise was eventually reached whereby Katharine Graham gave up part of her inheritance in favor of her children.

== Posthumous honors ==
On March 16, 1970, a television station in station in Miami, WLBW-TV, then-affiliated with ABC, honored Phil by changing their call letters to WPLG-TV. Post-Newsweek Stations (the broadcasting unit of the Washington Post Company, which is now known as Graham Media Group) owned WPLG from 1969 to 2014 when it was sold to Berkshire Hathaway; it is now an independent station as of August 2025.

== "First rough draft of history" ==
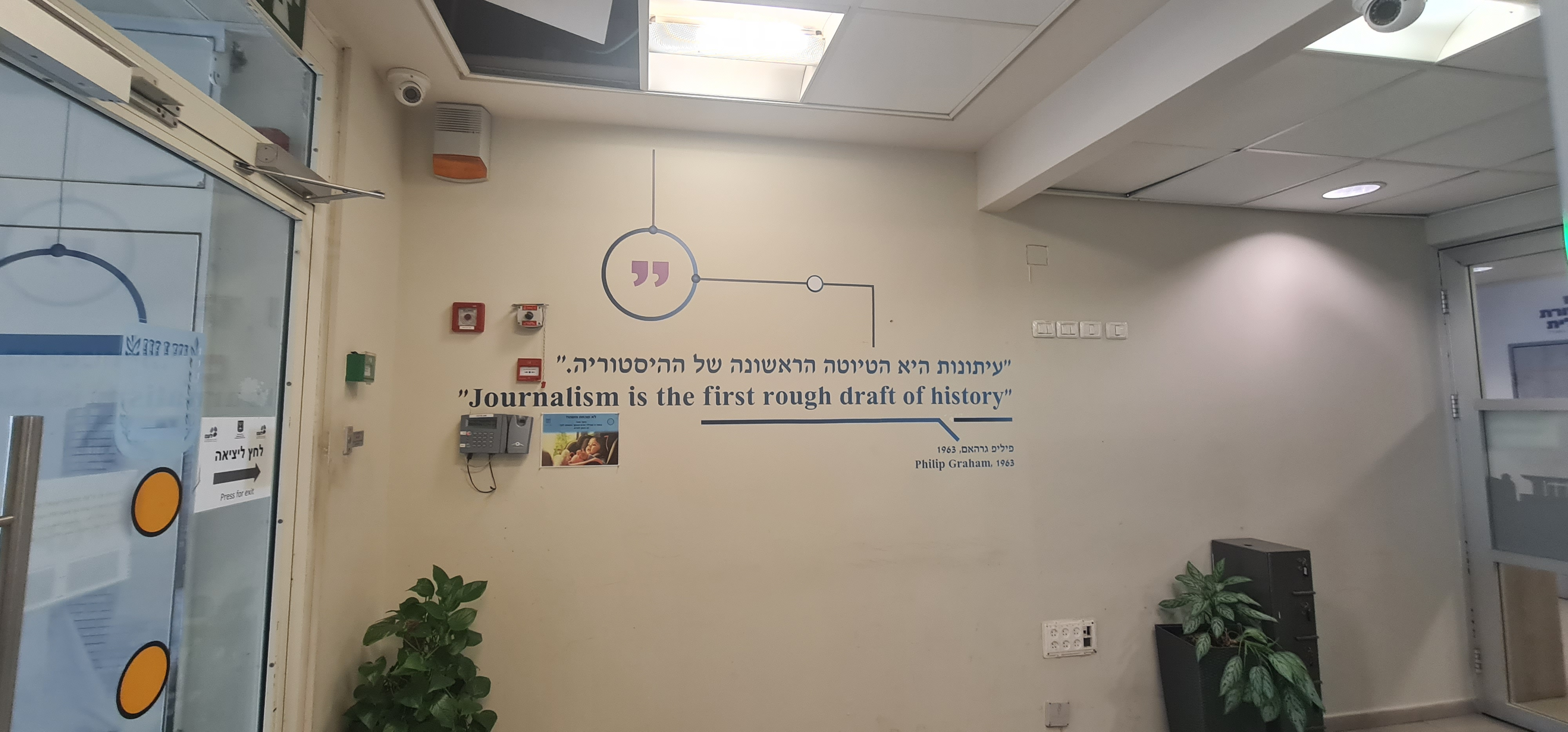
Quotation on wall at Israel's Government Press Office, being attributed to Phil Graham

In April 1963, Graham delivered a speech to the overseas correspondents of Newsweek in London:

So let us today drudge on about our inescapably impossible task of providing every week a first rough draft of history that will never really be completed about a world we can never really understand ...

The phrase "first rough draft of history" may have been popularized by Graham, but it did not originate with him. It had been used repeatedly in the Post in the 1940s and the earliest known use was by Alan Barth: "News is only the first rough draft of history," and earlier expressions of similar sentiments dating to the first decade of the 20th century.

== Personal life ==
On June 5, 1940, he married Katharine Meyer, a daughter of Eugene Meyer, a multi-millionaire and the owner of The Washington Post, then a struggling newspaper. The couple settled down in a two-story row house.

Their first baby died at birth. Four children followed: Elizabeth ('Lally') Morris Graham, now Weymouth (1943-2025), Donald Edward Graham (born April 22, 1945), William Welsh Graham (1948–2017), and Stephen Meyer Graham (born 1952).

== See also ==
- List of law clerks for the second seat of the Supreme Court of the United States
- List of law clerks for the sixth seat of the Supreme Court of the United States

Media offices
Preceded by Eugene Meyer (financier)	Publisher of "The Washington Post"; 1946 - 1961	Succeeded by John W. Sweeterman
