= Katharine Graham =

American newspaper publisher (1917–2001)

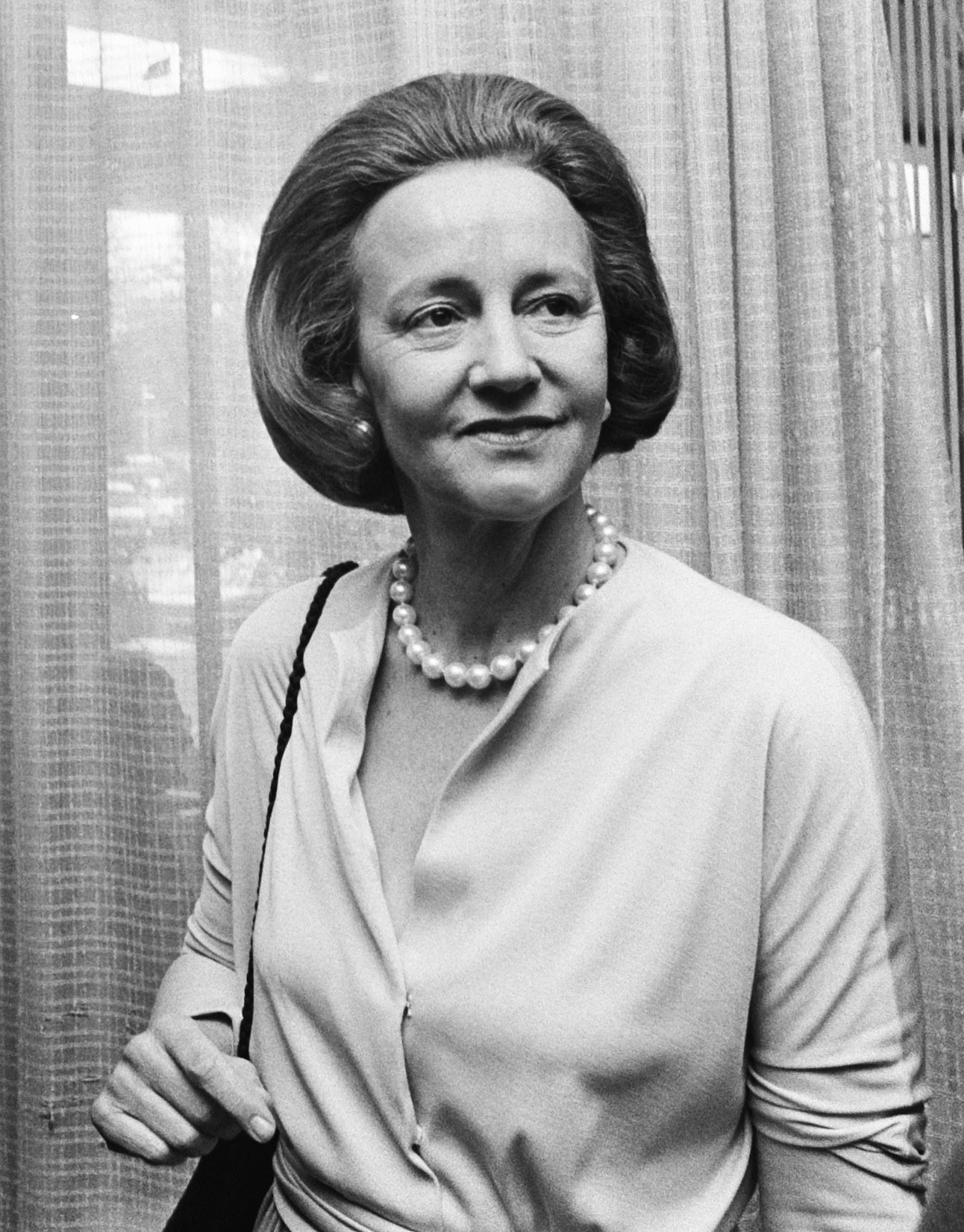
- Graham in 1975
- Born: Katharine Meyer; June 16, 1917; New York City, U.S.
- Died: July 17, 2001 (aged 84); Boise, Idaho, U.S.
- Resting place: Oak Hill Cemetery; Washington, D.C., U.S.
- Education: Vassar College; University of Chicago (B.A.)
- Occupation: Newspaper publisher
- Spouse: Philip Graham (m. 1940; died 1963)
- Children: 4, including Lally and Donald
- Parents: Eugene Meyer (father); Agnes Ernst (mother)
- Family: Florence Meyer (sister); Marc Eugene Meyer (grandfather); Joseph Newmark (great-grandfather); Florence Meyer Blumenthal (aunt)

Katharine Meyer Graham (June 16, 1917 – July 17, 2001) was an American newspaper publisher. She led her family's newspaper, The Washington Post, from 1963 to 1991. Graham presided over the paper as it reported on the Watergate scandal, which eventually led to the resignation of President Richard Nixon. She was one of the first 20th-century female publishers of a major American newspaper and the first woman elected to the board of the Associated Press.

Graham's memoir, Personal History, won the Pulitzer Prize in 1998.

== Early life ==
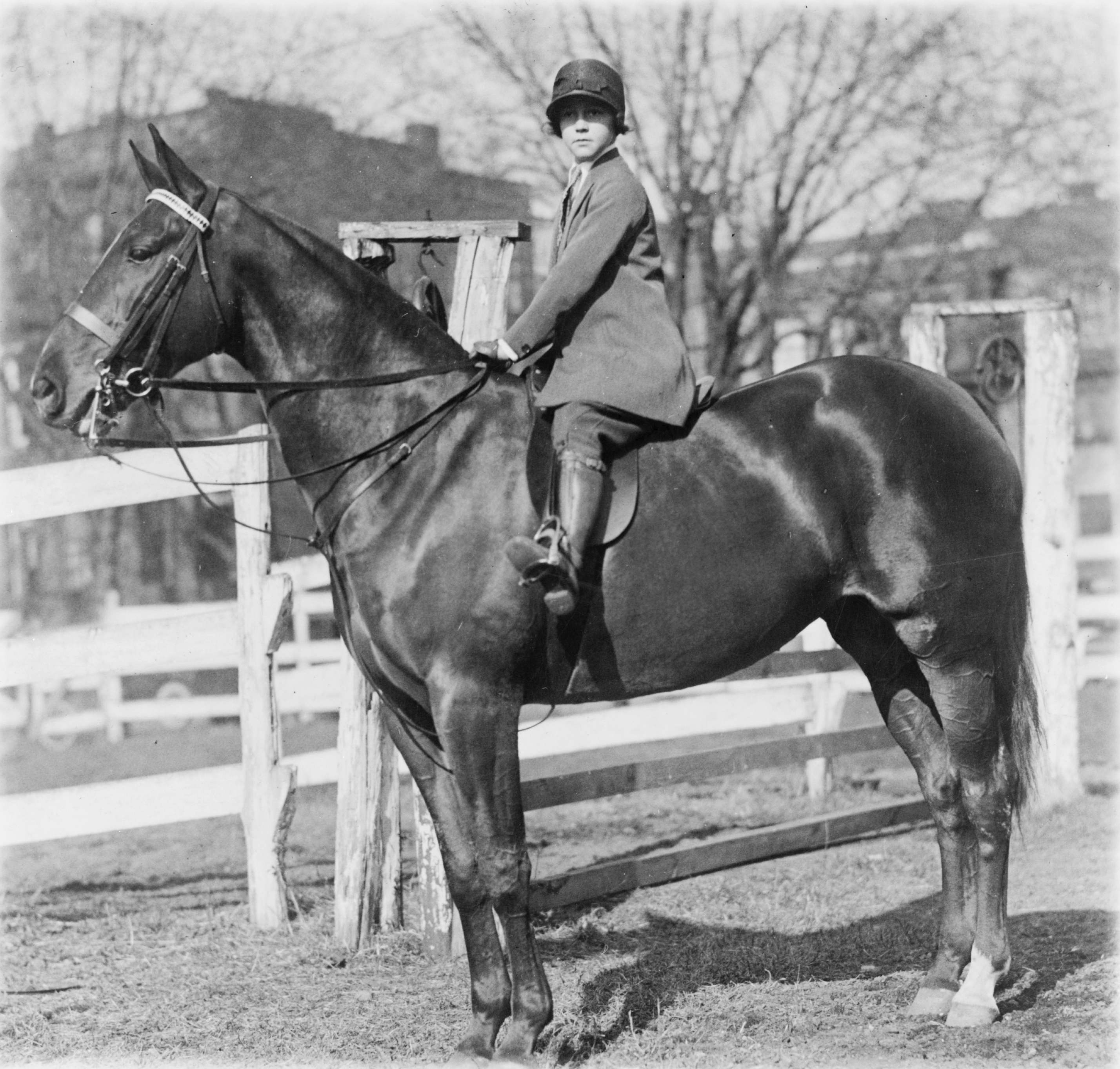
Katharine Meyer in 1926

Katharine Meyer was born on June 16, 1917, in New York City to Agnes (née Ernst) and Eugene Meyer. The Meyers were a wealthy family — her father was a financier and, from 1930 to 1933, the Chairman of the Federal Reserve; her grandfather was the financier Marc Eugene Meyer; and her great-grandfather, Rabbi Joseph Newmark, was also a businessman. Her father bought The Washington Post in 1933 at a bankruptcy auction. Her mother was a bohemian intellectual, art lover, and political activist in the Republican Party, who shared friendships with people as diverse as Auguste Rodin, Marie Curie, Thomas Mann, Albert Einstein, Eleanor Roosevelt, John Dewey and Saul Alinsky.

Her father was of Alsatian Jewish descent, and her mother was a Lutheran whose parents were German immigrants. Along with her four siblings, Katharine was baptized as a Lutheran but attended an Episcopal church. Her siblings included Florence, Eugene III (Bill), Ruth, and Elizabeth (Biss) Meyer.

Meyer's parents owned several homes across the country, but primarily lived between a mansion in Washington, D.C., and a large estate (later owned by Donald Trump) in Westchester County, New York. Meyer often did not see much of her parents during her childhood, as both traveled and socialized extensively; she was raised in part by nannies, governesses and tutors. Katharine endured a strained relationship with her mother. In her memoir, Katharine reports that Agnes could be negative and condescending towards her, which had a negative impact on Meyer's self-confidence.

Her older sister Florence Meyer was a successful photographer and wife of actor Oscar Homolka. Her father's sister, Florence Meyer Blumenthal, founded the Prix Blumenthal. Her father's brother, Edgar Meyer, was a mechanical engineer and vice president of the Braden Copper Company who perished in the sinking of the Titanic in April 1912.

As a child, Meyer attended a Montessori school until the fourth grade when she enrolled at The Potomac School. She attended high school at The Madeira School (to which her father donated land for its new Virginia campus), then Vassar College before transferring to the University of Chicago. In Chicago, she made friends with a group that would discuss politics and ideas, and developed an interest in liberal ideas, against the growing fascism in Germany and Italy and sympathetic to the American labor movement.

== Career ==
After graduation, Meyer worked for a short period at a San Francisco newspaper where, among other things, she helped cover a major strike by wharf workers. Meyer began working for the Post in 1938.

On June 5, 1940, Meyer was married to Philip Graham, a graduate of Harvard Law School and a clerk for Supreme Court Justice Felix Frankfurter. They had a daughter, Lally Morris Weymouth (1943-2025), and three sons: Donald Edward Graham (born 1945), William Welsh Graham (1948-2017) and Stephen Meyer Graham (born 1952). She was affiliated as a Lutheran.

William Graham died on December 20, 2017, in his Los Angeles home at the age of 69. Like his father, he died by suicide.

=== The Washington Post ===
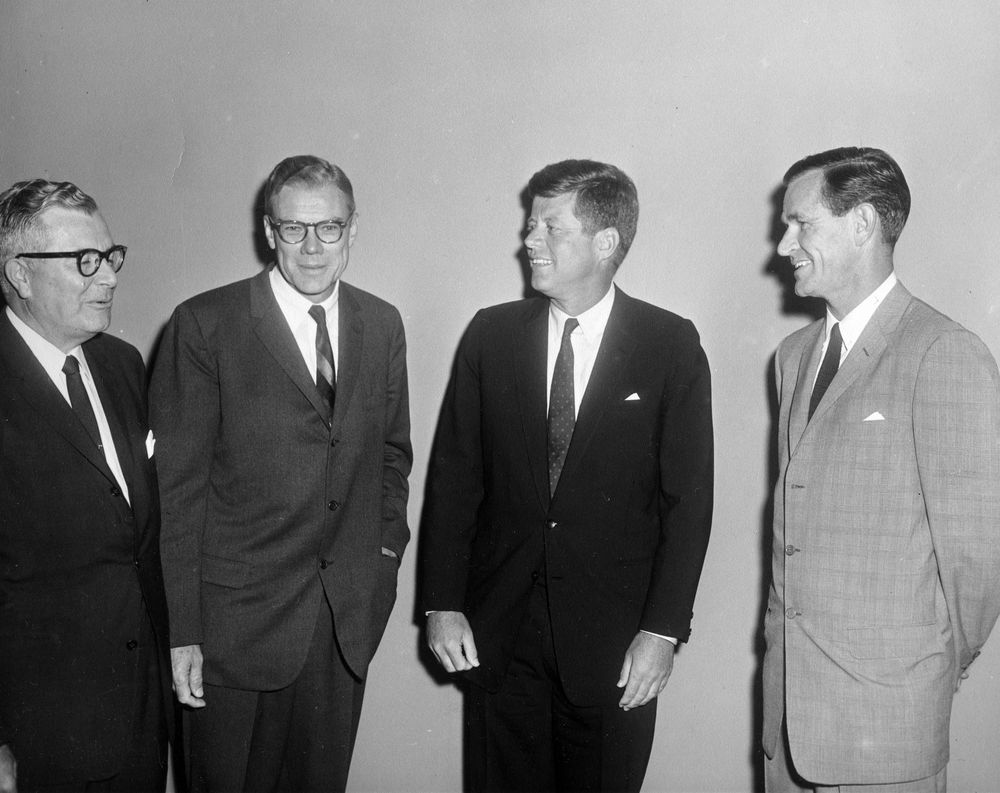
Washington Post owner Phil Graham (far right), editor J. Russell Wiggins (left), and publisher John W. Sweeterman with President Kennedy in 1961

Philip Graham became publisher of the Post in 1946, when Eugene Meyer handed over the newspaper to his son-in-law. Katharine recounts in her autobiography, Personal History, how she did not feel slighted by the fact her father gave the Post to Philip rather than her: "Far from troubling me that my father thought of my husband and not me, it pleased me. In fact, it never crossed my mind that he might have viewed me as someone to take on an important job at the paper." Her father, Eugene Meyer, went on to become the head of the World Bank, but left that position only six months later. He was Chairman of the Washington Post Company until his death in 1959, when Philip Graham took that position and the company expanded with the purchases of television stations and Newsweek magazine.

=== Social life and politics ===
The Grahams were important members of the Washington social scene, becoming friends with John F. Kennedy and Jacqueline Kennedy Onassis, Robert F. Kennedy, Lyndon B. Johnson, Robert McNamara, Henry Kissinger, Ronald Reagan, and Nancy Reagan among many others. Graham was part of the informal but influential Georgetown Set of Cold War liberals.

In her 1997 autobiography, Graham comments several times about how close her husband was to politicians of his day (he was instrumental, for example, in getting Johnson to be the Democratic vice-presidential nominee in 1960), and how such personal closeness with politicians later became unacceptable in journalism. She tried to push lawyer Edward Bennett Williams into the role of Washington, D.C.'s, first commissioner mayor in 1967. The position went to Howard University-educated lawyer Walter Washington.

Katharine Graham was also known for a long-time friendship with Warren Buffett, whose Berkshire Hathaway owned a substantial stake in the Post.

=== Leadership of the Post ===
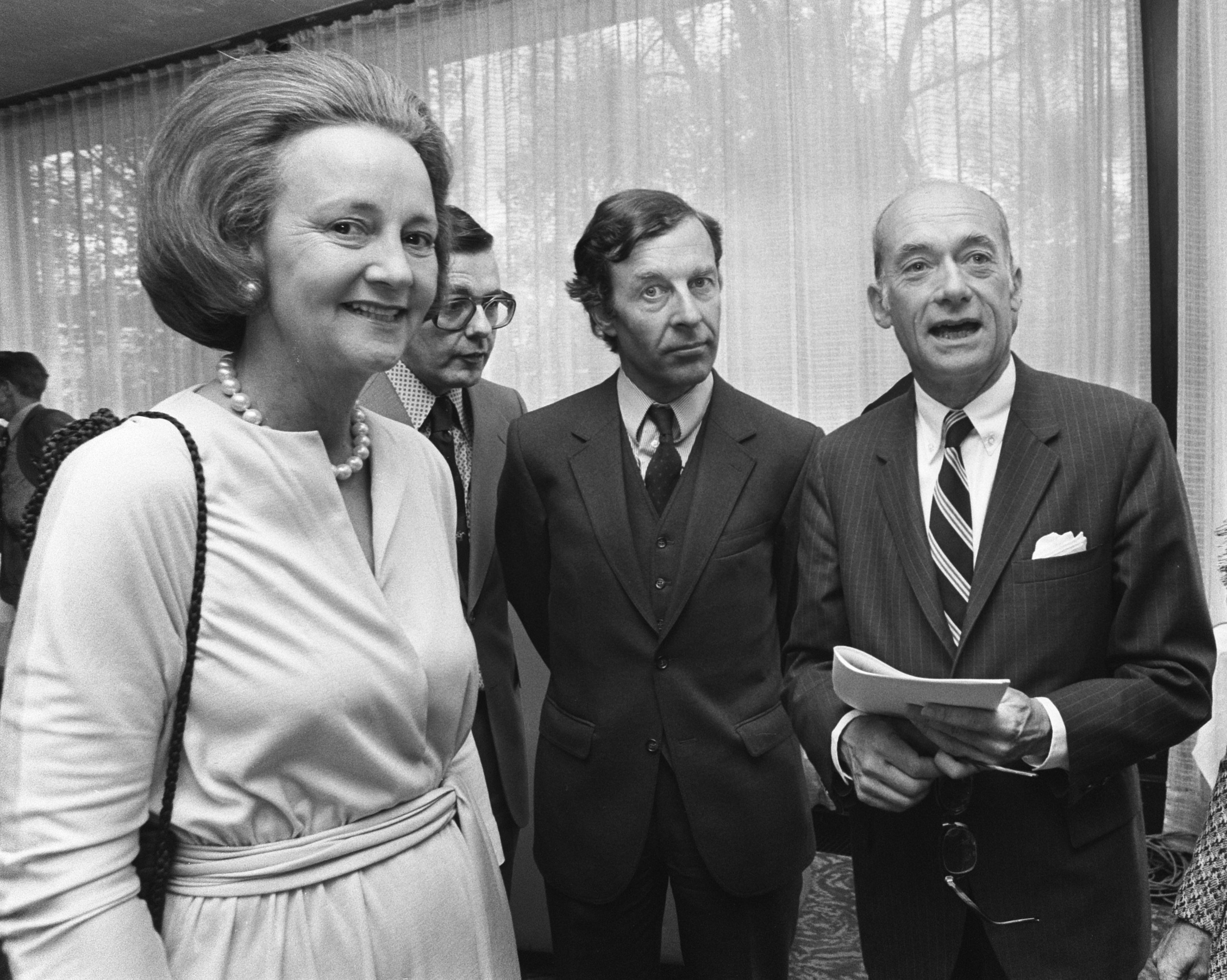
Graham with a Dutch news official and U.S. ambassador to the Netherlands, 1975

Katharine Graham assumed the reins of the company and of the Post after Philip Graham's suicide. She held the title of president and was de facto publisher of the paper from September 1963. She formally held the title of publisher from 1969 to 1979, and that of chairwoman of the board from 1973 to 1991. She became the first female Fortune 500 CEO in 1972, as CEO of the Washington Post Company. As the only woman to be in such a high position at a publishing company, she had no female role models and had difficulty being taken seriously by many of her male colleagues and employees. Graham outlined in her memoir her lack of confidence and distrust in her own knowledge. The convergence of the women's movement with Graham's control of the Post brought about changes in Graham's attitude and also led her to promote gender equality within her company.

Graham hired Benjamin Bradlee as editor, and cultivated Warren Buffett for his financial advice; he became a major shareholder and something of an eminence grise in the company. Her son Donald was publisher from 1979 until 2000.

=== Watergate ===
Graham presided over the Post at a crucial time in its history. The Post played an integral role in unveiling the Watergate conspiracy which ultimately led to the resignation of President Richard Nixon.

Graham and editor Bradlee first experienced challenges when they published the content of the Pentagon Papers. When Post reporters Bob Woodward and Carl Bernstein brought the Watergate story to Bradlee, Graham supported their investigative reporting and Bradlee ran stories about Watergate when few other news outlets were reporting on the matter.

In conjunction with the Watergate scandal, Graham was the subject of one of the best-known threats in American journalistic history. It occurred in 1972, when Nixon's attorney general, John Mitchell, warned reporter Carl Bernstein about a forthcoming article: "Katie Graham's gonna get her tit caught in a big fat wringer if that's published." The Post published the quote, although Bradlee cut the words her tit. Graham later observed that it was "especially strange of [Mitchell] to call me Katie, which no one has ever called me." (Graham's nickname was "Kay".)

=== Views regarding the relationship between the press and intelligence agencies ===
On November 16, 1988, Graham gave a speech titled "Secrecy and the Press" to a packed auditorium at CIA headquarters as part of that agency's Office of Training and Education's Guest Speaker series. In discussing the potential for press disclosures to affect national security, Graham said: "We live in a dirty and dangerous world. There are some things the general public does not need to know, and shouldn't. I believe democracy flourishes when the government can take legitimate steps to keep its secrets and when the press can decide whether to print what it knows."

== Other accomplishments and recognition ==
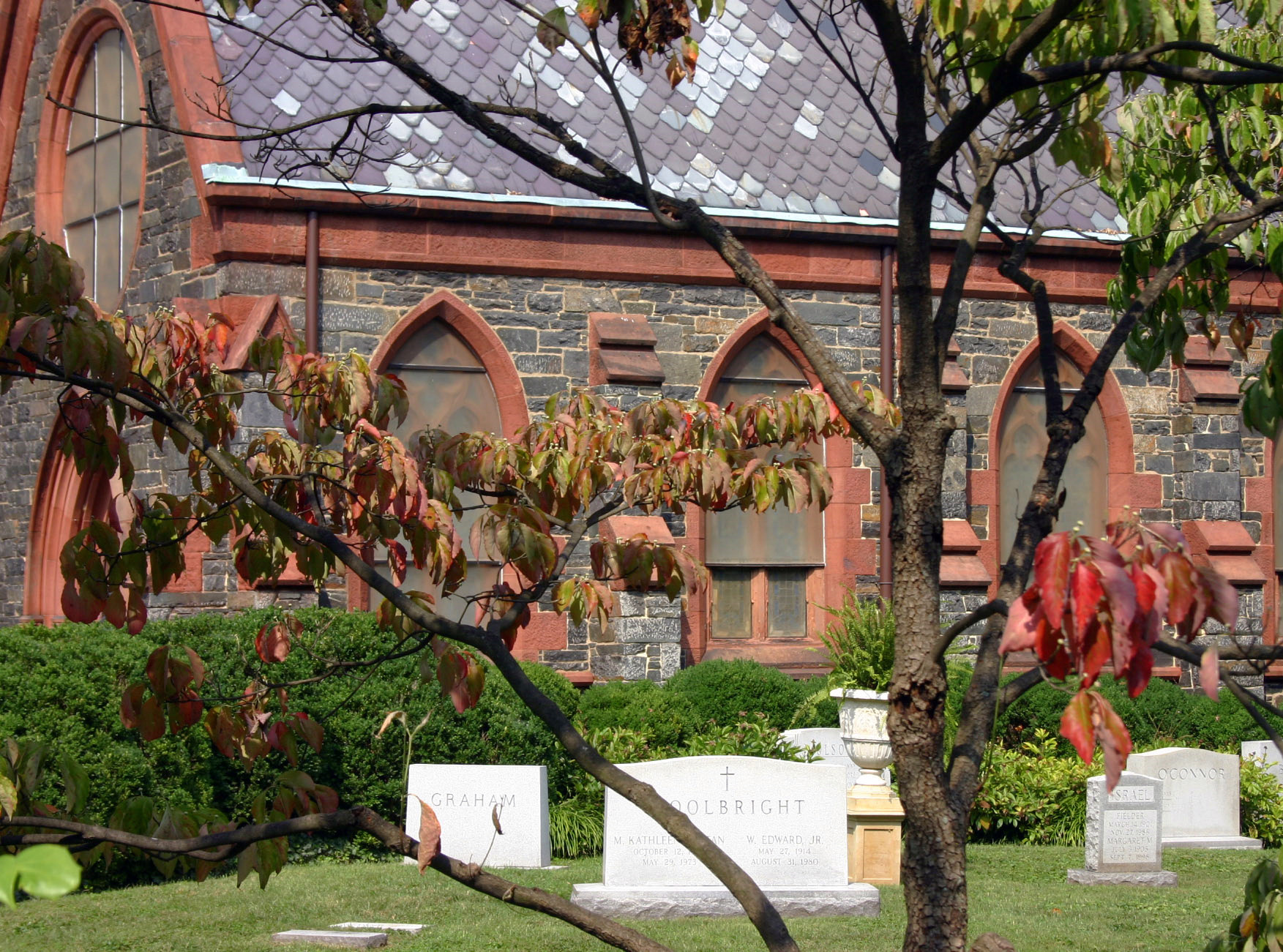
Graham's headstone (far left), located beside the Oak Hill Cemetery Chapel in Washington, D.C.

Graham had strong links to the Rockefeller family, serving both as a member of the Rockefeller University council and as a close friend of the Museum of Modern Art, where she was honored as a recipient of the David Rockefeller Award for enlightened generosity and advocacy of cultural and civic endeavors.

A dormitory in the Max Palevsky Residential Commons at the University of Chicago is named after Graham. Every year on March 2 they celebrate "Graham Day", in her honor.

Nora Ephron of the New York Times, who was at one point married to Carl Bernstein, raved about Graham's autobiography. She found it an amazing story of how Graham was able to succeed in a male-dominated industry. "Am I making clear how extraordinary this book is?" Ephron said. "She manages to rewrite the story of her life in such a way that no one will ever be able to boil it down to a sentence."

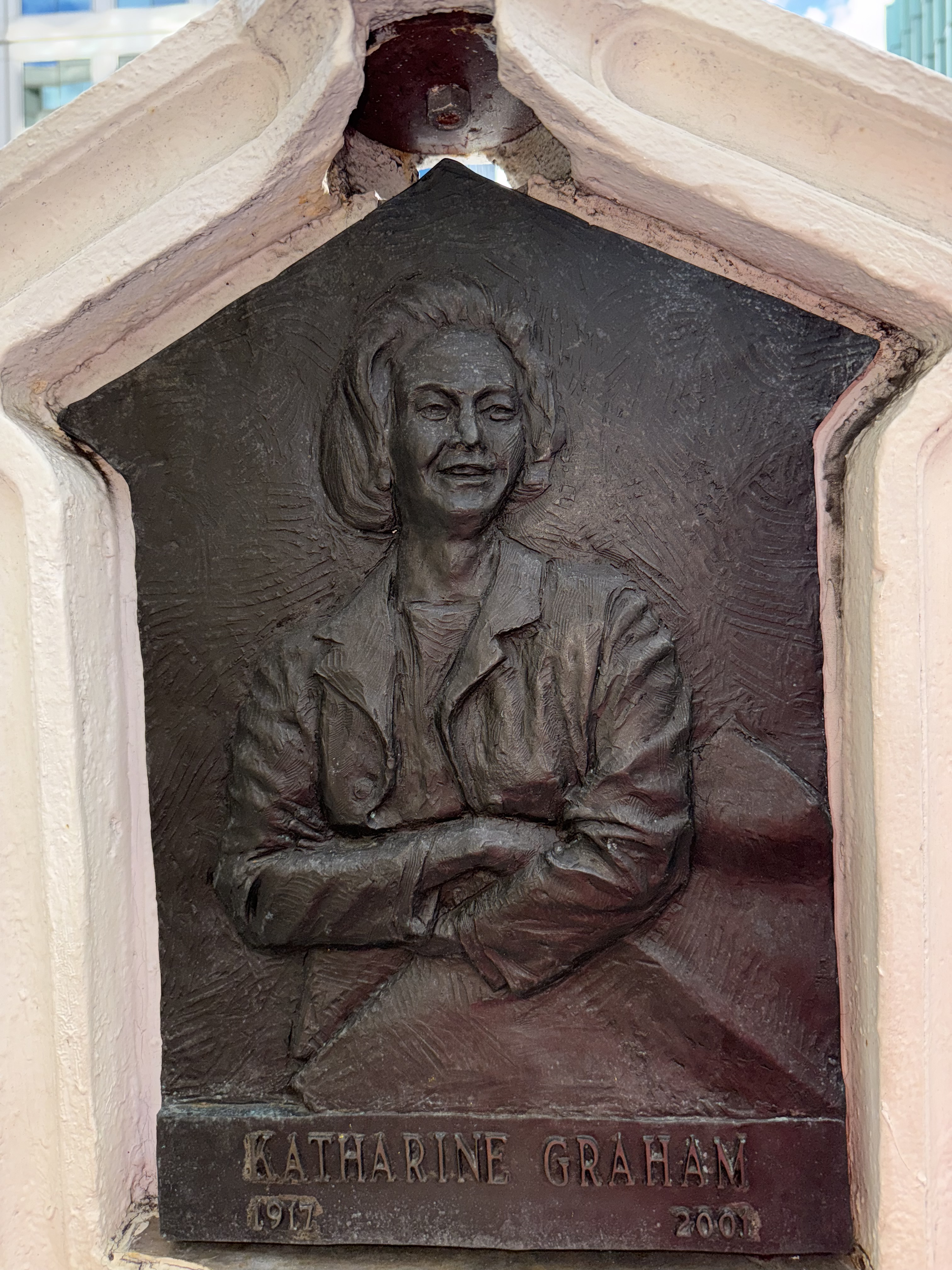
- Katherine Graham DC Memorial Callbox
  In 1966, Graham was the named honoree of Truman Capote's Black and White Ball.
- In 1973, Graham received the Elijah Parish Lovejoy Award as well as an honorary Doctor of Laws degree from Colby College.
- In 1974, Graham became the first woman elected to the board of directors at the Associated Press.
- In 1975, Graham received the S. Roger Horchow Award for Greatest Public Service by a Private Citizen, an award given out annually by Jefferson Awards.
- In 1979, the Supersisters trading card set was produced and distributed; one of the cards featured Graham's name and picture.
- In 1979, Deborah Davis published an unauthorized biography of Graham entitled Katharine the Great.
- In 1987, Graham won the Walter Cronkite Award for Excellence in Journalism.
- In 1988, Graham was elected a Fellow of the American Academy of Arts and Sciences.

External videos
- Booknotes interview with Graham on Personal History, February 16, 1997, C-SPAN

- In 1997, she received the Freedom medal for her commitment to freedom of speech and expression.
- In 1997, Graham published her memoirs, Personal History. The book was praised for its honest portrayal of Philip Graham's mental illness and received rave reviews for her depiction of her life, as well as a glimpse into how the roles of women have changed over the course of Graham's life.
- In 1998, her memoir, Personal History, won the Pulitzer Prize for Pulitzer Prize for Biography or Autobiography.
- On January 30, 1998, television station WCPX-TV in Orlando changed its callsign to WKMG-TV in honor of longtime Washington Post publisher, Katharine M. Graham.
- In 1999, Graham received the Golden Plate Award of the American Academy of Achievement. The award was presented by Awards Council member Coretta Scott King.
- In 2000, Graham was named one of the International Press Institute's 50 World Press Freedom Heroes of the past 50 years.
- In 2002, Graham was presented, posthumously, with the Presidential Medal of Freedom by President George W. Bush.
- In 2002, Graham was inducted into the National Women's Hall of Fame.
- In 2010, Graham was profiled in the National Portrait Gallery's One Life: Katharine Graham.
- In 2017, Graham was portrayed by Meryl Streep in the Steven Spielberg film The Post. Streep was nominated for an Academy Award for Best Actress (among other awards) for her work. Graham does not appear in the film adaptation of All The President's Men, but Robert Redford, who plays Woodward, revealed that Graham had a scene written for her in earlier versions where she asks Woodward and Bernstein (played by Dustin Hoffman) about the Watergate story, beginning with, "What are you doing with my paper?"

== Personal life ==
On June 5, 1940, Meyer was married to Philip Graham, a graduate of Harvard Law School and a clerk for Supreme Court Justice Felix Frankfurter. They had a daughter, Lally Morris Weymouth (1943-2025), and three sons: Donald Edward Graham (born 1945), William Welsh Graham (1948-2017) and Stephen Meyer Graham (born 1952). She was affiliated as a Lutheran.

In the 1980s, well after her husband Philip Graham's death in 1963, she was rumored to be dating Robert McNamara, the former secretary of defense, after his wife's death in 1981. Post reporter Bob Woodward describes seeing a photo of McNamara on her dresser.

=== Philip Graham's illness and death ===
Philip Graham dealt with alcoholism and mental illness throughout his marriage to Katharine. He had mood swings and often belittled her. On Christmas Eve in 1962, Katharine learned her husband was having an affair with Robin Webb, an Australian stringer for Newsweek. Philip declared that he would divorce Katharine for Robin, and he made motions to divide the couple's assets.

At a newspaper conference in Phoenix, Arizona, Philip had extreme depression due to his bipolar disorder. He was sedated, flown back to Washington, and placed in the Chestnut Lodge psychiatric facility in nearby Rockville. On August 3, 1963, he died by suicide with a shotgun at the couple's "Glen Welby" estate near Marshall in the Virginia horse country.

William Graham died on December 20, 2017, in his Los Angeles home at the age of 69. Like his father, he died by suicide.

== Death ==
On July 14, 2001, Graham fell and struck her head while visiting Sun Valley, Idaho; she was taken to St. Alphonsus Regional Medical Center in Boise, where she died three days later at the age of 84. Her funeral took place at the Washington National Cathedral. Graham is buried in historic Oak Hill Cemetery, across the street from her former home in Georgetown.

== Legacy ==
External videos
- Katharine Graham Funeral Service, July 23, 2001, C-SPAN

Graham is the subject of the 2025 documentary Becoming Katharine Graham.

== In popular culture ==
Graham is depicted by actress Meryl Streep in Steven Spielberg's 2017 political thriller film The Post.

== Notes ==
Media offices
Preceded by John W. Sweeterman	Publisher of "The Washington Post"; 1969 - 1979	Succeeded by Donald E. Graham
