= Sargent Kahanamoku =

Sargent Kahanamoku circa 1933

Sargent Hiikua Kahanamoku (March 5, 1910 – May 16, 1993) was a Native Hawaiian aquatic athlete and public relations spokesperson for Standard Oil Company. Sculptor Malvina Hoffman used him as her model for part of The Races of Mankind exhibit at the Field Museum of Natural History in Chicago. Sargent was the younger brother of Duke Kahanamoku.

== Family background ==
He was the youngest son born into a family of Native Hawaiians headed by Duke Halapu Kahanamoku and Julia Paʻakonia Lonokahikina Paoa. Both parents were direct descendants of Kamehameha I. His brothers were Duke, Samuel, David, William and Louis, all of whom participated in competitive aquatic sports. His sisters were Bernice, Kapiolani and Maria.

== Athletics ==
In 1925, at age 15 years, he won the backstroke event to help his 7th Grade classmates win a YMCA meet in Honolulu. At age 20, when he attended Andover Academy in Massachusetts, he won a 50-yard freestyle competition against a Yale University competitor.

Sargent was part of a crew for the July 22, 1933 canoe races off the Kona coast. Five days later, he and his friend Paul Fagan Jr. became stranded off the shore 3-1/2 miles from Diamond Head when Fagan's speed boat ran out of fuel. With no radio or other equipment aboard to help them, and no other boaters within signaling range, they began to drift out to sea. In a self-rescue reported on the front page of the Honolulu Star-Bulletin, with no rescue in sight, Sargent spent four hours towing the boat back to shore with one hand, while he used his feet and other hand to paddle through the water.

He and his brother Sam, along with Fred Wilhelm and Melvin Paoa, paddling for the Outrigger Canoe Club, won in the Junior 4 on June 11, 1937. Through the next decade, Sargent continued to compete in local aquatic meets in Hawaii. During the August 15, 1946 holiday celebrating the prior year's surrender of Japan (known then as alternately "Victory Over Japan Day" or "Veterans Day"), Sargent steered his crew of the "Kakina" outrigger to victory.

Circa 1939-1940, Sargent took up the game of golf. As he got older, his golf activities began to replace the more vigorous competitive aquatic sports.

== Business ==
In 1931, sculptor Malvina Hoffman used Sargent as her model for "Hawaiian Surf-Rider, Polynesia", part of The Races of Mankind exhibit at the Field Museum of Natural History in Chicago. The exhibit eventually went into storage, but was revived at the Field Museum in 2016.

He went to work for Standard Oil as its Hawaiian public relations representative, a position he held for 38 years. When President Franklin D. Roosevelt visited Hawaii in July 1934, Sargent and his brother Sam were part of the official welcoming ceremonies at the Royal Hawaiian Hotel.

Sargent was appointed chairman of the Hawaiian Heart Fund in 1963. In 1970, he ran unsuccessfully for the State Senate on the Republican ticket.

== Personal life ==
His first wife was school teacher Anna Furtado. She was elected to the Territorial House of Representatives, and to the State Senate after statehood was granted. The couple were King and Queen of Aloha Week in 1961. Anna died in 1969.

Catherine Toberman Torrence became his second wife in 1970. Her father was famous Los Angeles developer Charles E. Toberman, known as “Mr. Hollywood” after building landmarks such as the Hollywood Roosevelt Hotel, Grauman's Chinese Theatre and Hollywood Bowl. She died in 1980.

Sargent married for a third time to Mary Ray Kemp, a school teacher and principal originally from Cincinnati, Ohio. She described him as a people lover and an infinite source of stories of Hawaii. When Sargent died in 1993, his memorial service was held at the Outrigger Canoe Club. She died in 2014 and her memorial service was held at the Outrigger Canoe Club as well.
