= Heads or Tails =

Heads or Tails refers to coin flipping.

Heads or Tails may also refer to:

- Heads or Tails (game) using repeated coin flips

== Film ==
- Heads or Tails (1937 film), or Águila o sol, a Mexican film
- Heads or Tails (1969 film), or Testa o croce, an Italian western film
- Heads or Tails?, or Bomma Borusa, a 1971 Indian Telugu-language comedy film
- Heads or Tails (1982 film), or Testa o croce, or Heads I Win, Tails You Lose, an Italian comedy film
- Heads or Tails, or Pismo - Glava, a 1983 drama film by Bahrudin Čengić
- Heads or Tails (1971 film), or Pile ou face, a Canadian film
- Heads or Tails (1997 film), or J'en suis!, a Canadian film
- Heads or Tails (2005 film), an American drama film
- Heads or Tails? (2025 film), or Testa o croce?, an Italian-American Western film

== Other uses ==
- Heads or Tails, a 2010 British TV game show hosted by Justin Lee Collins
- Heads or Tails?, a 2005 music album by Sowelu
- Heads or Tales, a music album by Saga

== See also ==
- Heads and Tails (disambiguation)
- Heads and Tales (disambiguation)
- Obverse and reverse
