= Richard Hofmann (disambiguation) =

Richard Hofmann may refer to:

- Richard Hofmann, (1906-1983), German footballer
- Richard Hofmann (composer), (1844-1918), German composer
- Richie Hofmann,-(born 1987), American poet

== See also ==
- Richard Hoffman (composer), (1831-1909), English-American pianist and composer
- Richard Hoffmann (composer), (1925-2021), American composer and musicologist
