= Anna Kahanamoku =

American politician

Anna Kuulei Kahanamoku

Hawaii Board of Education

Member Territorial House of Representatives
- In office 1954–1958

Member of the Hawaii State Senate, 3rd Legislature, 4th District
- Incumbent
- Assumed office 1965

Personal details
- Born: September 28, 1911 Lahaina, Maui, Hawaii
- Died: March 28, 1969 (aged 57)
- Spouse: Sargent Kahanamoku

Anna Kuulei Kahanamoku (née Furtado; September 28, 1911 – March 28, 1969) was a Hawaiian teacher who became an elected Fourth District member of the Hawaii Territorial House of Representatives. After Hawaii was admitted to statehood, she served in the Hawaii State Senate. She and her husband Sargent Kahanamoku were active in civic endeavors. They were elected the King and Queen of Aloha Week in 1961. Upon her death, the Rev. Abraham Akaka eulogized her as, "a racial rainbow of colors imbued and accepted in one person."

== Early life ==
She was born Anna Kuulei Furtado on September 28, 1911 to Antonio and Lucy Furtado in Lahaina, Maui. Her ancestry was Portuguese, Chinese and Hawaiian. She received her early education at Kamehameha Schools. Furtado matriculated at the University of California, Santa Barbara, earning a BA before returning home to pursue graduate work at the University of Hawaii.

== Career ==
Prior to her teaching position at a junior high school in Hoolehua, Molokai, she worked at Palama Settlement nonprofit social service agency in the Kalihi area of Oahu. Following her two-year stint on Molokai, she then taught for 15 years at Washington Intermediate (Middle) School in Honolulu.

In 1950, she left teaching to accept an appointment as sales representative for Pan American World Airways.

Elected to the Territorial House of Representatives 1954–1958, she did so to get more funds and services allocated for education, and was chairman of the Education Committee 1956–1958. Following the 1959 Hawaii Admission Act, the territory became the 50th state in the union. At the end of her service as a territorial representative, she was employed as an executive with Pan American World Airways in 1960. She was elected to the state Board of Education in 1961, becoming its chairman in 1963. Anna was elected to the Hawaii State Senate in 1964, taking office in 1965, serving as chairman of Public Employment Committee, and as a member of Education Ways and Means Committee.

== Personal life ==
She was married to aquatic athlete Sargent Kahanamoku, brother of Olympic medalist Duke Kahanamoku. The couple were both active in local theatre productions. In 1961, they were King and Queen of Aloha Week.

Anna served as 1968 residential drive chairman for the American Cancer Society, and was active on several local boards and charities.

== Death ==
Anna died at home on March 28, 1969. A thousand people attended a Honolulu memorial for her that was held at Kawaiahaʻo Church. the Rev. Abraham Akaka eulogized her as, "a racial rainbow of colors imbued and accepted in one person."

== See also ==
- Hawaii State Legislature
