= Heads and Tales =

Heads and Tales or Heads & Tales may refer to:

- Heads and Tales (book), a 1936 book by Malvina Hoffman
- Heads & Tales (album), a 1972 music album by Harry Chapin
- Heads and Tales (film), a 2021 Indian film

== See also ==
- Heads and Tails (disambiguation)
- Heads or Tails (disambiguation)
