= Heads and Tails =

Heads and Tails may refer to:

- Obverse and reverse, sides of a coin
- Coin flipping
- Heads and Tails (card game), a solitaire card game which uses two decks of playing cards.
- Heads and Tails (crowd game), touching ones head or tail
- Heads and Tails (film), a 1995 Russian Film
- Heads and Tails (Russian telecast), a Ukrainian Russian-speaking travel series
- Heads and Tails (TV series), a British children's programme

== See also ==
- Heads or Tails (disambiguation)
- Heads and Tales (disambiguation)
- CAR and CDR, use of "heads and tails" in programming
- Fish Heads and Tails, a 1989 album by Goodbye Mr. Mackenzie
- "Heads Carolina, Tails California", a 1996 song by Jo Dee Messina
