= Heads or Tails (2005 film) =

- Directed by: Clark Kline; Joey McAdams
- Written by: Clark Kline; Joey McAdams
- Produced by: Ryan Keller; Jared Freedom Leonard
- Starring: Jeff Keilholtz; Jon Liddiard; Douglas Cathro; Amber Davila; Mike Hotovy; Madalyn Loughlin
- Cinematography: Brian Mackey
- Edited by: Jake Ruthven
- Music by: Will Saxton
- Distributed by: Fool Martyr Productions
- Release date: February 19, 2005
- Country: United States
- Language: English
- Budget: $12,000

Heads or Tails (stylized heads or tails) is a 2005 film written and directed by Joey McAdams and Clark Kline. Produced by Fool Martyr Productions, the film stars Jeff Keilholtz, Douglas Cathro and Jon Liddiard.

== Cast ==
- Jeff Keilholtz as Blaze
- Jon Liddiard as Typhoon
- Douglas Cathro as Miller
- Amber Davila as Kari
- Mike Hotovy as John
- Madalyn Loughlin as Anise

additional cast

- Mary Hotovy as Julianna
- Wendy Loughlin as Miller's Wife
- Christine Maisano as Samantha
- Marsha O'Connor as News Reporter
- Stewart Walker as Greg
- Clark Kline as Blaze's Father

== Production ==
The film was shot "in and around" the Frederick, Maryland area on HD video with a budget of "just-under $12,000". Production began in September 2003 and lasted two months, before resuming in the summer of 2004. The shoot was disrupted by an "early snowfall", necessitating the delay. Directors Clark Kline and Joey McAdams did not allow actors to read the complete script during filming.

== Release ==
On February 19, 2005, the film premiered at the Weinberg Center for the Arts in Frederick. It was released to DVD in the spring of 2008.
