= The Races of Mankind =

Series of 104 sculptures created by Malvina Hoffman

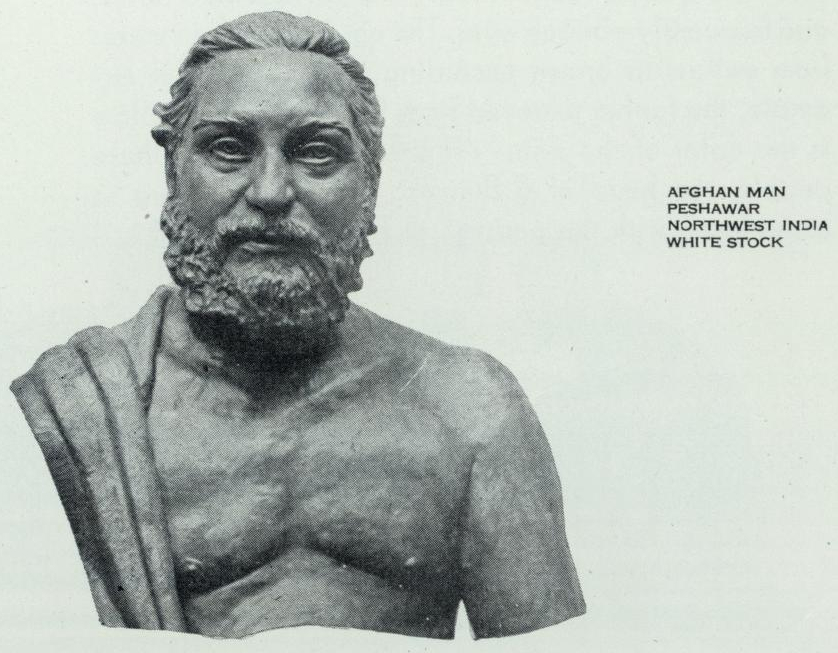
Afghan man of Irano-Afghan Caucasoid type, from The Races of Mankind by Malvina Hoffman (1929).

The Races of Mankind is a series of 104 sculptures created for the Field Museum of Natural History in Chicago by sculptor Malvina Hoffman, representing the various races of humankind, and unveiled in 1933. Most of the sculptures are life-sized. The works were initially housed in Hall 3, the Chauncey Keep Memorial Hall ("The Hall of the Races of Mankind").

Hoffman wrote about her travels around the world to draw and sculpt the various different types of people in her 1936 book Heads and Tales. In her letters from the field, Hoffman told museum curators that she wanted to illustrate the dignity and individuality of each of her subjects.

After decades of revised thinking about race and difference, the museum removed the “scientifically indefensible and socially objectionable” bronzes (per curator Donald Collier) from view in 1969. For decades, some of the works could be found in various places in the museum. Others were in storage. In 2015, the Field Museum restored many of the sculptures, and in January 2016 the museum mounted a new exhibition, Looking at Ourselves: Rethinking the Sculptures of Malvina Hoffman.

== See also ==
- Samuel Grimson, Hall of Man Expedition, Field Museum "Hall of Man Expedition, Field Museum". March 14, 2024.
- Field Museum Profile Page of Malvina Hoffman "Malvina Hoffman".
