= Heads and Tales (book) =

1936 book by Malvina Hoffman

- Title page for Heads and Tales (1936)
- Author: Malvina Hoffman
- Publication date: 1936

Heads and Tales is a book by Malvina Hoffman first published in 1936. The book chronicles Hoffman's travels and efforts to create a series of sculptures for the Field Museum of Natural History's Races of Mankind exhibit, after being appointed to sculpt it in 1929. The parameters of the project were spelled out by Henry Field, who stated that Hoffman, “was commissioned to proceed to those lands where native races are at their purest and there register in clay and finish in bronze the living lineaments of selected types".

The book, dedicated to Ignace Jan Paderewski, begins with a discussion of Hoffman's early years and her time studying to be a sculptor, with some importance placed on her relationships with Auguste Rodin and Ivan Meštrović. Some attention is paid to the process of making sculpture, about her relationships with the Valsuani Foundry and the Roman Bronze Works, both of whom specialized in the lost wax process.

The second portion of the book details with Hoffman's travels in the Balkans, Africa, and other places prior to being picked for the Field Museum project.

The most important third section begins with “When we started on our ‘Round the World” trip in September 1931”, and from there on the book concerns itself with her producing the life-sized sculptures for the Races of Mankind exhibit. Her story winds up in Taos, New Mexico to create her "aboriginal American” sculptures.

The sculptures that Hoffman made are used as illustrations in another book, The March of Civilization in maps and pictures.
