= Richard Hoffman (composer) =

English-American pianist and composer (1831–1909)

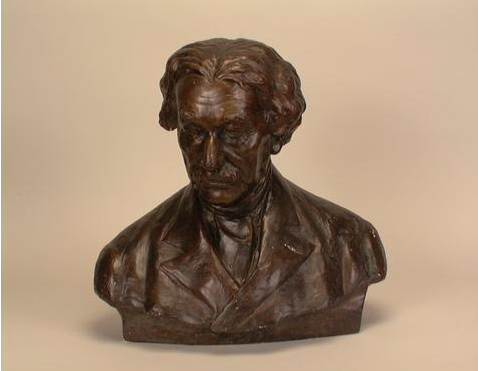
Malvina Hoffman, Richard Hoffman, dark brown bronze painted plaster, 1909, New York Historical Society Museum and Library

Richard Hoffman (24 May 1831 – 17 August 1909) was an English-born American pianist and composer.

== Early life and education ==
Richard Hoffman was born on 24 May 1831 in Manchester, England. He migrated to New York City in his 16th year. He received early instruction from Anton Rubinstein, Franz Liszt, Sigismond Thalberg, Theodor Döhler and Leopold von Meyer.

== Career ==
After his arrival in America he made a tour of the country as a soloist, and accompanied Jenny Lind on her tours beginning in 1850. He also played with Louis Moreau Gottschalk and in 1875 with Hans von Bülow in New York. He also appeared with the New York Philharmonic regularly.

He composed music for the piano, songs, anthems, ballads and church music and was also a teacher. He attained an international reputation for his performances. He wrote Some Musical Recollections of Fifty Years about his life, which was published in 1910.

== Personal life ==
Hoffman married Fidelia Marshall Lamson in 1869. They had a daughter, Malvina Hoffman, who was a portrait sculptor.

He died on 17 August 1909 in Mount Kisco, New York. The marble replica of the bust of her father was exhibited at the National Academy of Design.

== Selected recordings ==
- "Dixiana", and "In Memoriam L.M.G." on recital The Wind Demon and other 19th-century piano works by Ivan Davis (piano)
