= Aloha Festivals =

Annual series of celebrations held in Hawaii, USA

- Aloha Festivals
- Status: Active
- Genre: Festivals
- Frequency: Annually
- Venue: State-wide
- Location: Hawaii
- Country: USA
- Years active: 1946–2019, 2021–
- Inaugurated: 1946
- Founder: Former members of the local Junior Chamber of Commerce
- Most recent: 2009
- Participants: 30,000
- Attendance: 1,000,000
- Major events: Concerts, parades, street parties

The Aloha Festivals are an annual series of free cultural celebrations observed in the state of Hawaii in the United States based on the Makahiki, the beginning of the Native Hawaiian year marked by the sighting of the Pleiades (Makali'i). It is the only statewide cultural festival in the nation. Highlights include the presentation of the Royal Court, a ho'olaule'a in Waikiki, and the Floral Parade. Approximately 30,000 people volunteer to plan, organize, and provide labor for the Aloha Festivals each year. Their efforts entertain over 1,000,000 people from throughout the state and visitors from all over the world.

== History ==
=== Establishment ===
In the spirit of preserving the Hawaiian culture and heritage, the Aloha Festivals were established in 1946 as Aloha Week by former members of the local Junior Chamber of Commerce. The former manager of the festivals, Goriann Akau, has said, "In 1946, after the war, Hawaiians needed an identity. We were lost and needed to regroup. When we started to celebrate our culture, we began to feel proud. We have a wonderful culture that had been buried for a number of years. This brought it out again. Self-esteem is more important than making a lot of money."

=== Scaling down ===
The festival was celebrated on six of Hawaii's islands, but in 2008 festival organizers decided to hold most events on Oahu due to a lack of funding. There was also the chance that the Floral Parade would be cancelled altogether, but it was saved by private donors and funds from the City and County of Honolulu.

No Aloha festival was held in 2020. That was caused by the COVID-19 pandemic, a year which had many disruptions. However it did resume in 2021.

== Events ==
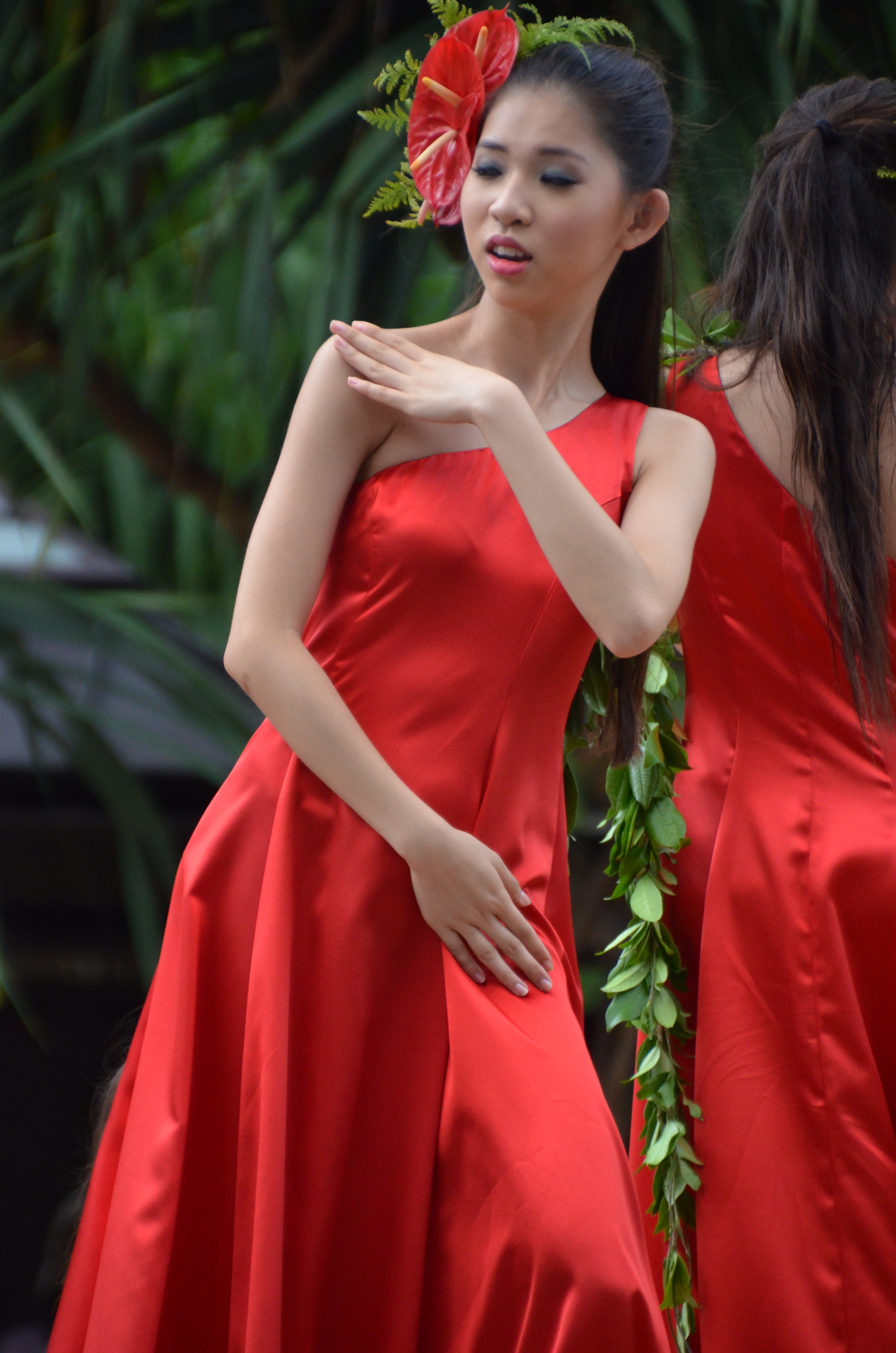
Hula dancers are an important part of the multicultural displays at the Aloha Festivals Floral Parade in Waikīkī

=== Presentation of the Royal Court ===
The court is selected from a pool of applicants, all of whom must be of Hawaiian ancestry and of certain ages. The festival itself begins with the presentation of the royal court during the opening ceremony. The ceremony takes place at Helumoa, a section of Waikiki near the Royal Hawaiian Center.

=== Floral Parade ===
The Floral Parade starts at the intersection of Ala Moana Boulevard and Kamakee st. and goes through Waikiki before finishing at Kapiolani Park. The parade features p'au riders, marching bands, hula halaus, and that year's Aloha Festival Royal Court.

=== Hoʻolauleʻa ===
The Hoʻolauleʻa is a block party held in Waikiki. There is Hawaiian music, hula, and food. Attendance is typically in the thousands.

== Themes ==
Each year has a specific theme:

- 2025/2024: TBD
- 2023: Piliʻaina - kinship with the Land
- 2022: Aloha ʻAina - Love of the Land
- 2021: Ke Ala I ka ma mua ka wa Mahope: The road to the future leads through the past(Royal court investiture only, held virtually)
- 2020: Parade Cancelled due to 9/11/20
- 2019: Nā Mo'olelo ʻUkulele: 'Ukulele Stories.
- 2018: No Ke Kai Kakou E ("We are of the Sea")
- 2017: He Lei Aloha ke Keiki: Children are our Garland of Love
- 2016: Hāli‘a Aloha ("Treasured memories")
- 2015: Hula Aloha ("Beloved Feather Treasures")
- 2014: Maluhia Honua, World Peace with Aloha
- 2013: Moana Nui Akea - Celebrating Ocean Voyaging

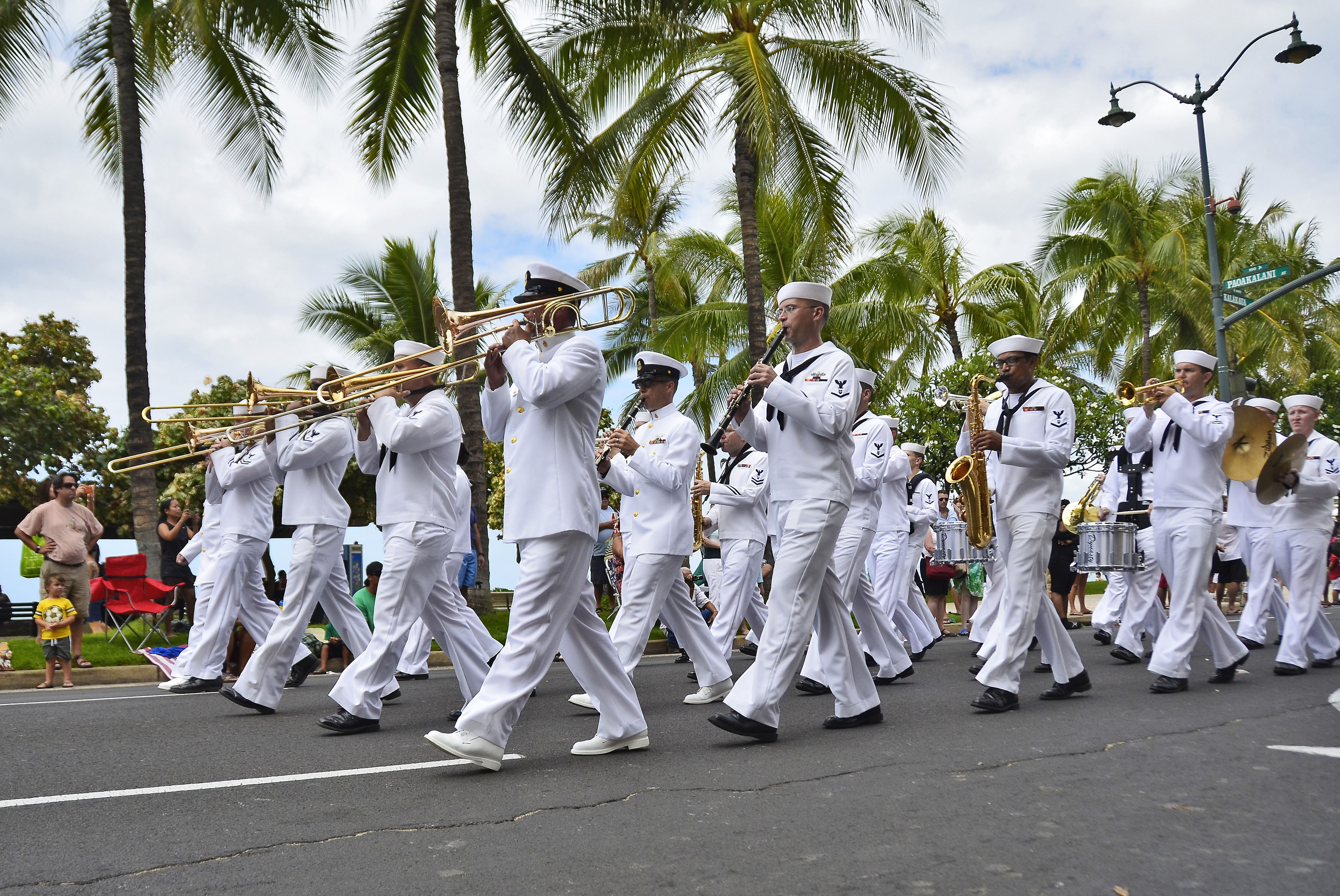
Navy band performs in the Aloha Parade, 2012

- 2012: Hoʻonui ʻIke - to Increase Knowledge
- 2011: Mele Ailana - Celebrate Island Music
- 2010: ? (info needed for this years)
- 2009: Hula ("Let the Story Be Told")

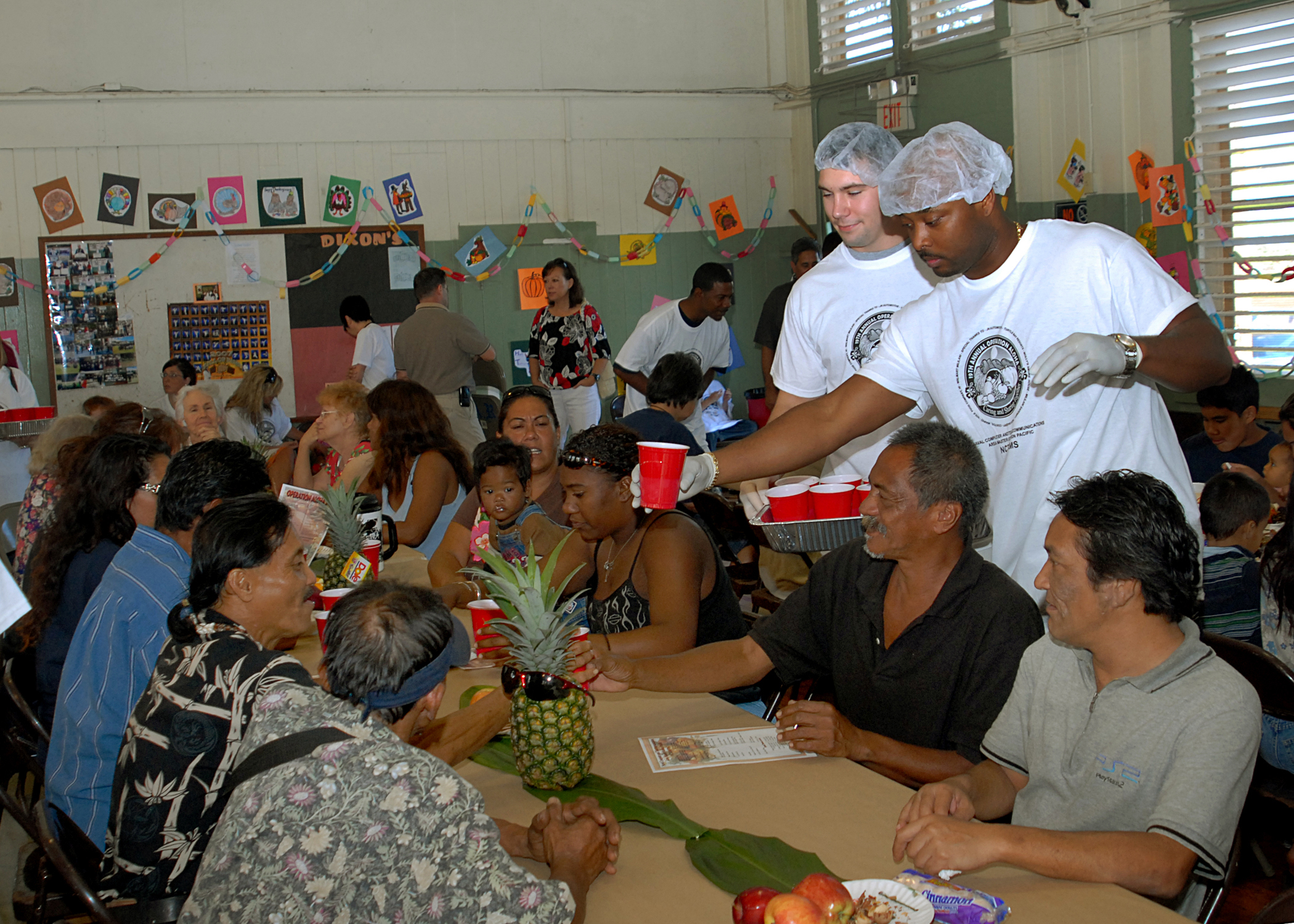
Operation Aloha Thanksgiving Dinner community dinner in Hawaii in 2008, sponsored annually by the Waialua Community Association

- 2008: Hula ("The Art of Hawaiian Dance")
- 2007: Ke Kahua Lani o Hawaii
- 2006: Na Paniolo Nui o Hawaii - The Great Cowboys of Hawaii
- 2005: Nā Honu Hawaiʻi ("The Spirit Within")
- 2004: No Nā Kamaliʻi ("For the Children")
- 2003: E Mau Ana Ka Hula I Ke Kanaka ("Hula Lives Through Its People")
- 2002: Ka ʻUhane O Ka Loea ("The Spirit of the Masters")
- 2001: Hoʻohanohano I Nā Holokai ("Honor the Voyagers")
- 2000: He Makana O Nā Lei Nani ("A Gift of Beautiful Leis")
- 1999: Hui Pū I ka Hula ("Together in Song and Dance")
- 1998: Ola Ka ʻŌiwi ("The Natives Endure")
- 1997:
- 1996:

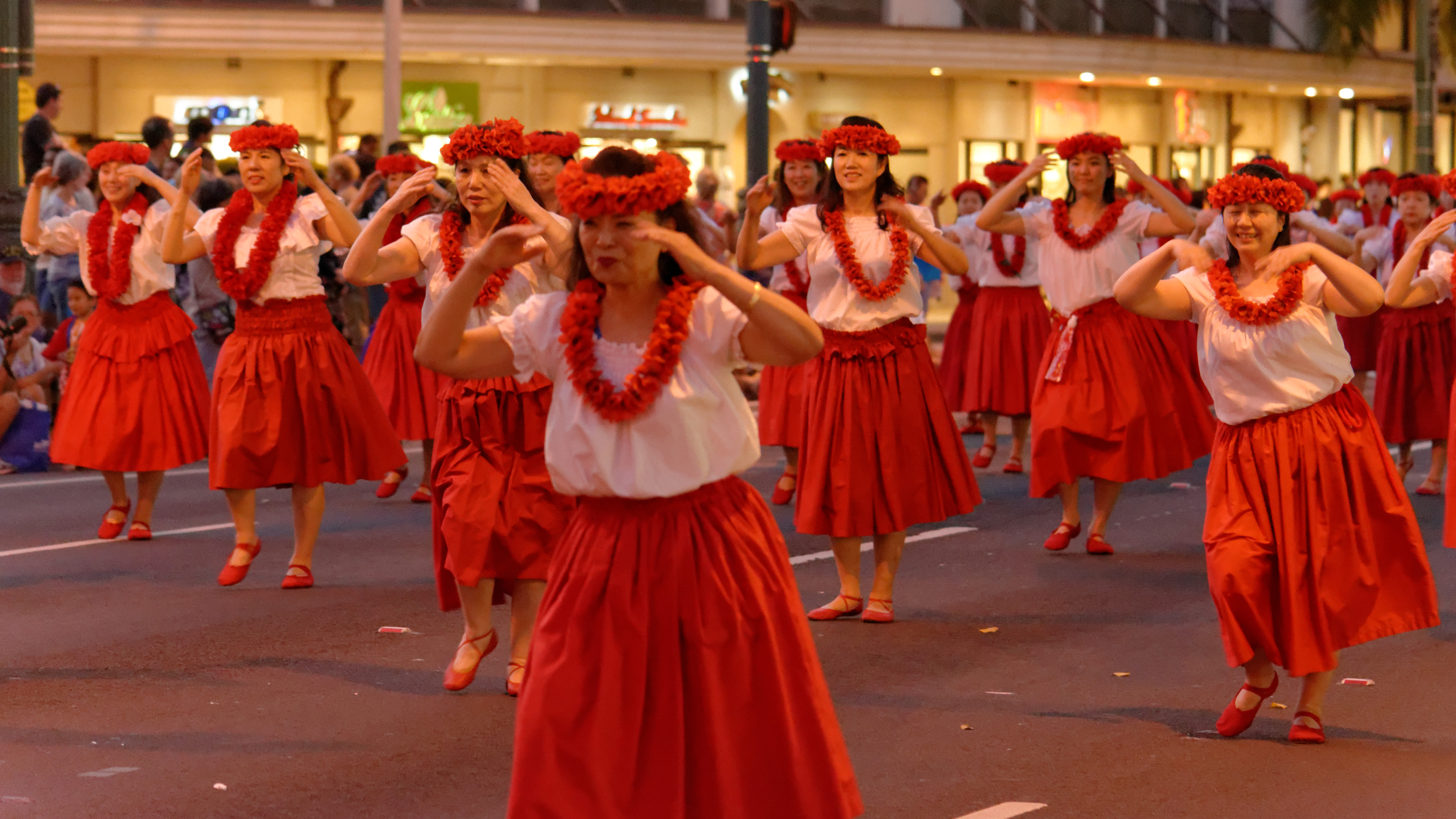
Aloha Festival dancers in Honolulu, 2014

- 1995: Hoʻala Hou - To Reawaken
- 1994: Lokomaikai: Of gracious and beautiful spirit
- 1993: E Pilimain: Come together as One
- 1992: He ʻOhana Kakou - We are all Family
- 1991: E Pupukahi
- 1990: Na Kamalei
- 1989: Mai Kupuna Mai
- 1988: Pulama - We Cherish
- 1987: We are Enriched
- 1986: This Land of Aloha
- 1985:
- 1984: Kulia I ka Nuʻu: Strive to Reach the Summit
- 1983: He Makana Makamae ʻo Ke Aloha
- 1982: Hawaii - the Isles of Smiles
- 1981: Rainbows of Aloha
- 1954: Pule Hoʻohakahala
