= Vice Chair of the Federal Reserve =

Second-highest officer of the United States Federal Reserve System

Vice Chair of the Board of Governors of the Federal Reserve System
- Seal of the Board of Governors

- Flag of the Federal Reserve System

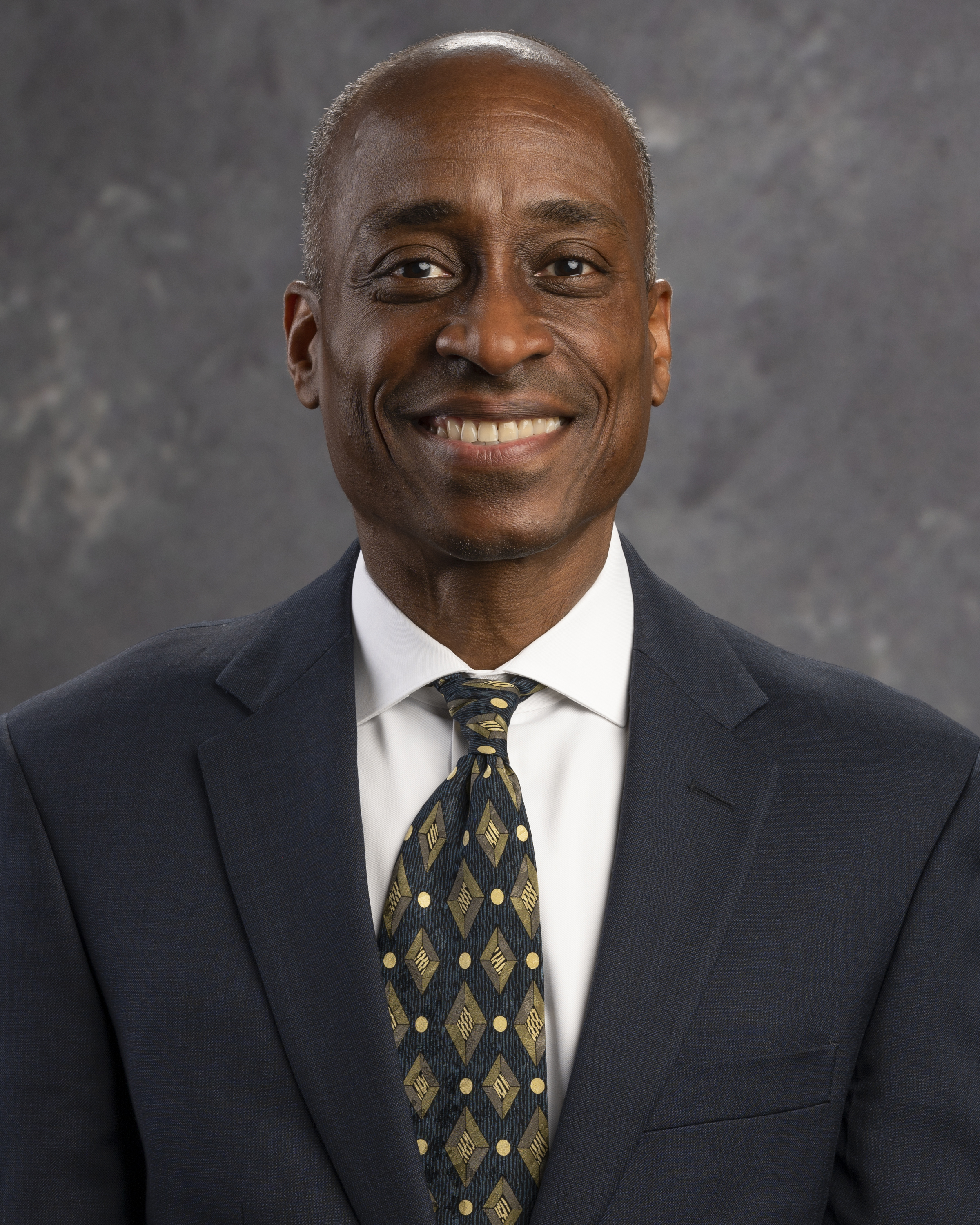
- Incumbent; Philip Jefferson since September 13, 2023
- United States Federal Reserve System
- Member of: Board of Governors; Open Market Committee
- Reports to: United States Congress
- Seat: Eccles Building; Washington, D.C.
- Appointer: The president with Senate advice and consent
- Term length: Four years, renewable (as vice chair); 14 years, non-renewable (as governor)
- Constituting instrument: Federal Reserve Act
- Formation: August 10, 1914; 112 years ago
- First holder: Frederic Adrian Delano
- Salary: Executive Schedule, Level II
- Website: www.federalreserve.gov

The vice chair of the Board of Governors of the Federal Reserve System is the second-highest officer of the Federal Reserve, after the chair of the Federal Reserve. In the absence of the chair, the vice chair presides over the meetings of the Board of Governors of the Federal Reserve System.

The vice chair and the vice chair for supervision each serve a four-year term after being nominated by the president of the United States and confirmed by the United States Senate, and they serve concurrently as members of the Board of Governors. Both vice chairs may serve multiple terms, pending a new nomination and confirmation at the end of each term, with Ronald Ransom as the longest serving vice chair from 1936 to 1947. They cannot be dismissed by the president before the end of their term.

The position of vice chair is currently held by Philip Jefferson who was sworn in on September 13, 2023. The position of vice chair for supervision is currently held by Michelle Bowman after Michael Barr's resignation which took effect on February 28, 2025, and her confirmation by a vote of 48–46.

== Appointment process ==
As stipulated by the Banking Act of 1935, the president may designated to serve as Vice Chairman of the Board for four-year terms with the advice and consent of the Senate, from among the sitting governors. The Senate Committee responsible for vetting a Federal Reserve vice chair and vice chair for supervision nominees is the Senate Committee on Banking.

== Duties of the Fed vice chairs ==
The vice chair of the Board shall serve in the absence of the chair as leader of the Federal Reserve system until chair's replacement was installed by the Senate.

By law, the vice chair, as part of the Board, makes a full report of its operations to the speaker of the House, on progress towards the Fed's responsibilities and monetary policy objectives, which are "maximum employment, stable prices, and moderate long-term interest rates."

The duties of the vice chair for supervision include developing policy recommendations regarding supervision and regulation for the Board. The vice chairman of supervision reports to Congress semiannually on the efforts of the board with respect to the conduct of supervision and regulation.

By law, the vice chair for supervision shall appear before the Senate Committee on Banking, Housing, and Urban Affairs and the House Committee on Financial Services of the House of Representatives and at semi-annual hearings regarding the efforts, activities, objectives, and plans of the Board with respect to the conduct of supervision and regulation of depository institution holding companies and other financial firms supervised by the Board.

== Conflict of interest law ==
The law applicable to the chair, vice chairs and all other members of the board provides (in part):

No member of the Board of Governors of the Federal Reserve System shall be an officer or director of any bank, banking institution, trust company, or Federal Reserve bank or hold stock in any bank, banking institution, or trust company; and before entering upon his duties as a member of the Board of Governors of the Federal Reserve System he shall certify under oath that he has complied with this requirement, and such certification shall be filed with the secretary of the Board.

== Salary ==
The Vice Chair of the Federal Reserve and the Vice Chair for Supervision are Level II positions in the Executive Schedule, thus earning the salary prescribed for that level (US$203,700, as of January 2023).

== List of Fed vice chairs ==
The following is a list of past and present vice chairs of the Board of Governors of the Federal Reserve System. A vice chair serves for a four-year term after appointment, but may be reappointed for several consecutive four-year terms. Since the Federal Reserve was established in 1914, the following people have served as vice chair. (Note: The position was established as Vice Governor of the Federal Reserve Board on December 23, 1913; thereafter became Vice Chairman of the Board of Governors of the Federal Reserve System on August 23, 1935; and re-aligned to be gender-neutral after Rivlin became the first female officeholder on June 25, 1996.)

#	Name (birth–death)	Term (Note: The start date given here for each officeholder is the day they took the oath of office, and the end date is the day of their term expiration, resignation, retirement, or death.)		Duration	Appointer (Note: A fixed term with reappointment for the Vice Chair, then known as Vice Governor, was not added to the Federal Reserve Act until the Banking Act of 1935 (P.L. 74-305, 49 Stat. 684).)
#	Name (birth–death)	Start	End	Duration	Appointer
1	Frederic Delano (1863–1953)	August 10, 1914	August 9, 1916	1 year, 365 days	Woodrow Wilson
2	Paul Warburg (1868–1932)	August 10, 1916	August 9, 1918	1 year, 364 days	Woodrow Wilson
3	Albert Strauss (1864–1929)	October 26, 1918	March 15, 1920	1 year, 141 days	Woodrow Wilson
4	Edmund Platt (1865–1939)	July 23, 1920	September 14, 1930	10 years, 53 days	Woodrow Wilson
5	John Thomas (1869–unknown)	August 21, 1934	February 10, 1936	1 year, 173 days	Franklin D. Roosevelt
6	Ronald Ransom (1882–1947)	August 6, 1936	December 2, 1947	11 years, 118 days	Franklin D. Roosevelt
7	Canby Balderston (1897–1979)	March 11, 1955	February 28, 1966	10 years, 354 days	Dwight D. Eisenhower John F. Kennedy
8	James Robertson (1907–1994)	March 1, 1966	April 30, 1973	7 years, 60 days	Lyndon B. Johnson Richard Nixon
9	George Mitchell (1904–1997)	May 1, 1973	February 13, 1976	2 years, 288 days	Richard Nixon
10	Stephen Gardner (1921–1978)	February 13, 1976	November 19, 1978	2 years, 279 days	Gerald Ford
11	Frederick Schultz (1929–2009)	July 27, 1979	February 11, 1982	2 years, 199 days	Jimmy Carter
12	Preston Martin (1923–2007)	March 31, 1982	April 30, 1986	4 years, 30 days	Ronald Reagan
13	Manley Johnson (born 1949)	August 4, 1986	August 3, 1990	3 years, 364 days	Ronald Reagan
14	David Mullins (1946–2018)	July 24, 1991	February 14, 1994	2 years, 205 days	George H. W. Bush
15	Alan Blinder (born 1945)	June 27, 1994	January 31, 1996	1 year, 218 days	Bill Clinton
16	Alice Rivlin (1931–2019)	June 25, 1996	July 16, 1999	3 years, 21 days	Bill Clinton
17	Roger Ferguson (born 1951)	October 5, 1999	April 28, 2006	6 years, 205 days	Bill Clinton George W. Bush
18	Don Kohn (born 1942)	June 23, 2006	June 23, 2010	4 years, 0 days	George W. Bush
19	Janet Yellen (born 1946)	October 4, 2010	February 3, 2014	3 years, 122 days	Barack Obama
20	Stanley Fischer (1943–2025)	June 16, 2014	October 16, 2017	3 years, 122 days	Barack Obama
21	Richard Clarida (born 1957)	September 17, 2018	January 14, 2022	3 years, 119 days	Donald Trump
22	Lael Brainard (born 1962)	May 23, 2022	February 18, 2023	271 days	Joe Biden
23	Philip Jefferson (born 1961/1962)	September 13, 2023	Incumbent	2 years, 360 days	Joe Biden

== List of Fed vice chairs for supervision ==
The Dodd–Frank Wall Street Reform and Consumer Protection Act, which came into force on July 21, 2010, required the president to designate, by and with the advice and consent of the Senate, a new "Vice Chairman for Supervision," who "shall develop policy recommendations for the Board regarding supervision and regulation of depository institution holding companies and other financial firms supervised by the Board and shall oversee the supervision and regulation of such firms." Since the Dodd–Frank Act was enacted in 2010, the following people have served as vice chair for supervision.

#	Name (birth–death)	Term		Duration	Appointer
#	Name (birth–death)	Start	End	Duration	Appointer
1	Randy Quarles (born 1957)	October 13, 2017	October 13, 2021	4 years, 0 days	Donald Trump
2	Michael Barr (born 1965)	July 19, 2022	February 28, 2025	2 years, 224 days	Joe Biden
3	Michelle Bowman (born 1971)	June 9, 2025	Incumbent	1 year, 91 days	Donald Trump

== See also ==
- History of central banking in the United States
