= Federal Reserve Board of Governors =

Governing body of the U.S. Federal Reserve System

Board of Governors of the Federal Reserve System
- Seal of the Federal Reserve System

- Flag of the Federal Reserve System

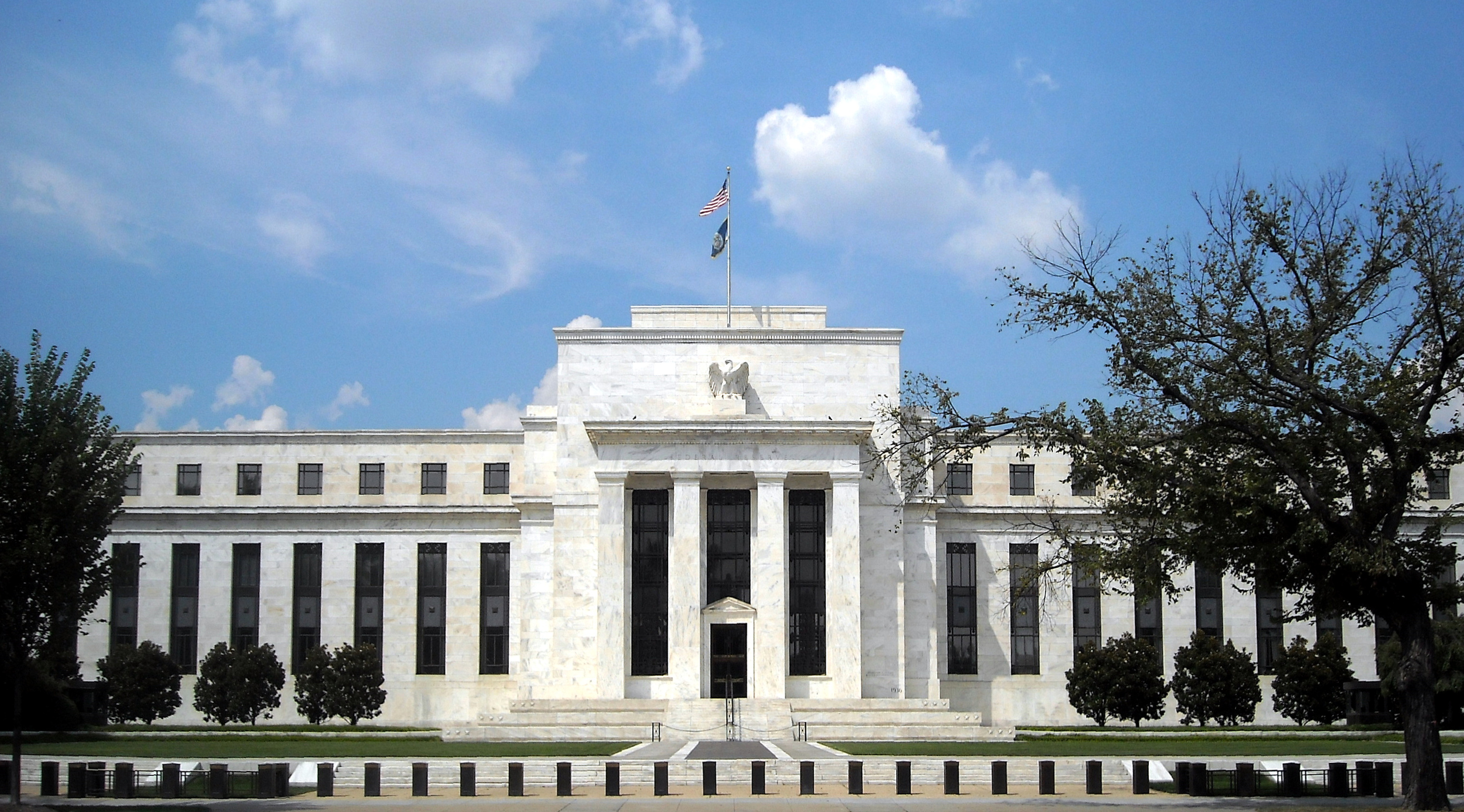
- The Eccles Building in Washington, D.C., which serves as the Federal Reserve System's headquarters
- Central bank of: United States
- Headquarters: Eccles Building, Washington, D.C., U.S.
- Established: December 23, 1913 (112 years ago)
- Governing body: Board of Governors
- Key people: Kevin Warsh, Chair; Philip Jefferson, Vice Chair; Michelle Bowman, Vice Chair for Supervision
- Currency: United States dollar USD (ISO 4217)
- Reserve requirements: None
- Bank rate: 3.75%
- Interest rate target: 3.50-3.75%
- Interest on reserves: 3.65%
- Interest paid on excess reserves?: Yes
- Website: Official website
- Federal Reserve Board of Governors

Agency overview
- Jurisdiction: Federal government of the United States
- Child agency: Federal Open Market Committee
- Key document: Federal Reserve Act

The Board of Governors of the Federal Reserve System, commonly known as the Federal Reserve Board, is the main governing body of the Federal Reserve System of the United States. It oversees the Federal Reserve Banks and the implementation of the monetary policy of the United States.

Each governor is appointed by the president of the United States and confirmed by the Senate to staggered 14-year terms, such that the tenures of all seven members span multiple presidential and congressional terms. Members who have served a full term are not eligible for reappointment, although governors who were initially appointed to serve an uncompleted term may be reappointed to a full term.

All seven board members of the Federal Reserve Board of Governors, along with the five Federal Reserve Bank presidents, are members of the Federal Open Market Committee, which directs the open market operations that sets monetary policy. The chair and vice chair are appointed by the president, drawn from the sitting Governors. They both serve a four-year term and can be renominated by the president as many times until their board terms expire.

== Statutory description ==
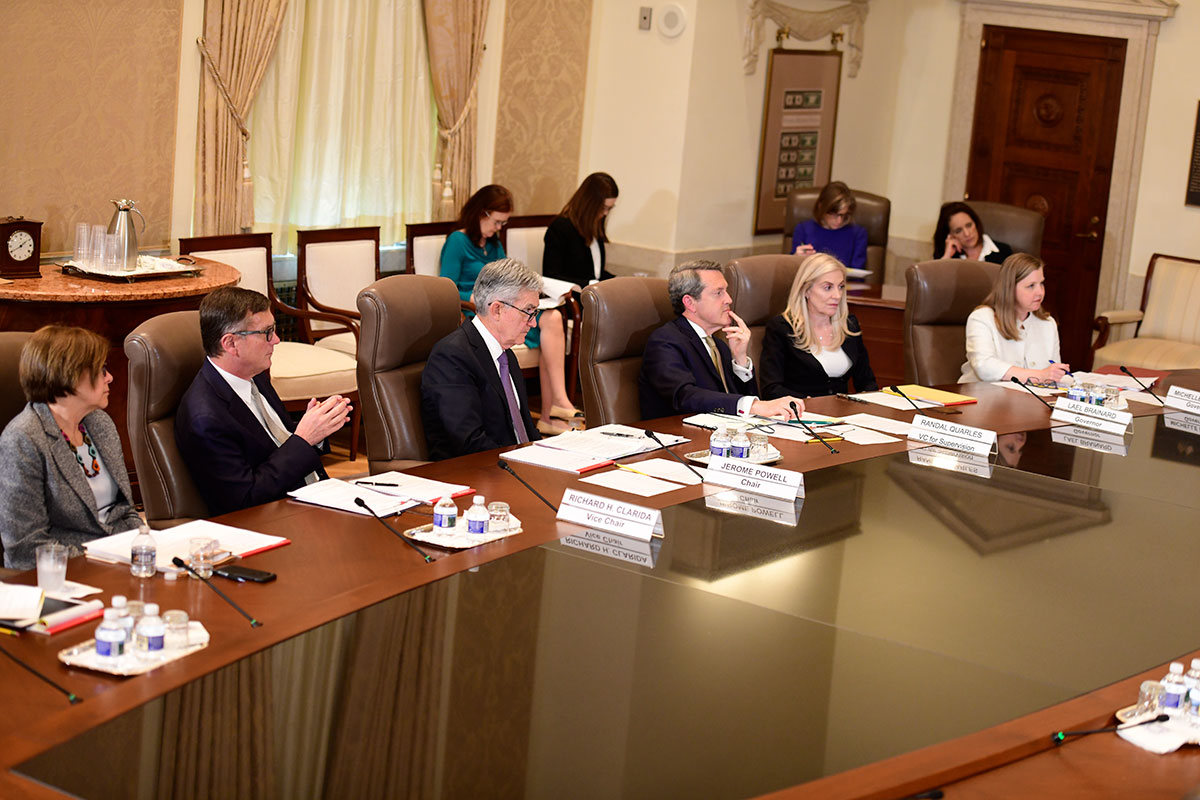
A Board of Governors meeting in April 2019

Governors are appointed by the president of the United States and confirmed by the Senate for staggered 14-year terms. By law, the appointments must yield a "fair representation of the financial, agricultural, industrial, and commercial interests and geographical divisions of the country". As stipulated in the Banking Act of 1935, the chair and vice chair of the Board are two of seven members of the Board of Governors who are appointed by the president from among the sitting governors of the Federal Reserve Banks.

The terms of the seven members of the board span multiple presidential and congressional terms. Once a member of the Board of Governors is appointed by the president, the members function mostly independently. Such independence is unanimously supported by major economists. The board is required to make an annual report of operations to the speaker of the House. It also supervises and regulates the operations of the Federal Reserve Banks, and the U.S. banking system in general. The Board obtains its funding from charges that it assesses on the Federal Reserve Banks, and not from the federal budget, though net earnings of the Federal Reserve Banks are ultimately remitted to the US Treasury.

Membership is by statute limited in term, and a member who has served for a full 14-year term is not eligible for reappointment. However, individuals have been appointed to serve the remainder of another member's uncompleted term and thereafter reappointed to serve a full 14-year term. Since "upon the expiration of their terms of office, members of the Board shall continue to serve until their successors are appointed and have qualified", a member can serve for significantly longer than a full term of 14 years. The law provides for the removal of a member of the board by the president "for cause".

The chair, vice chair, and vice chair for supervision of the Board of Governors are appointed by the president from among the sitting governors. They each serve a four-year term and they can be renominated as many times as the president chooses until their terms on the Board of Governors expire.

All seven board members of the Federal Reserve Board of Governors and five Federal Reserve Bank presidents direct the open market operations that set U.S. monetary policy through their membership in the Federal Open Market Committee (FOMC).

Records of the Federal Reserve Board of Governors are found in the Record Group number 82 at the National Archives and Records Administration.

== Current members ==
The current members of the Board of Governors are as follows:

List of members of the board of governors
Portrait	Name	Party	Start	Term expires
	Kevin Warsh (chair)	Republican	May 22, 2026 (as chair)	May 21, 2030 (as chair)
	Kevin Warsh (chair)	Republican	May 22, 2026 (as governor)	January 31, 2040 (as governor)
	Philip Jefferson (vice chair)	Democratic	September 13, 2023 (as vice chair)	September 7, 2027 (as vice chair)
	Philip Jefferson (vice chair)	Democratic	May 23, 2022 (as governor)	January 31, 2036 (as governor)
	Michelle Bowman (vice chair for supervision)	Republican	June 9, 2025 (as vice chair)	June 9, 2029 (as vice chair)
	Michelle Bowman (vice chair for supervision)	Republican	November 26, 2018 (as governor); February 1, 2020 (reappointment)	January 31, 2034 (as governor)
	Jerome Powell	Republican	May 25, 2012; June 16, 2014 (reappointment)	January 31, 2028
	Christopher Waller	Republican	December 18, 2020	January 31, 2030
	Lisa Cook	Democratic	May 23, 2022; February 1, 2024 (reappointment)	January 31, 2038
	Michael Barr	Democratic	July 19, 2022	January 31, 2032

== Committees ==
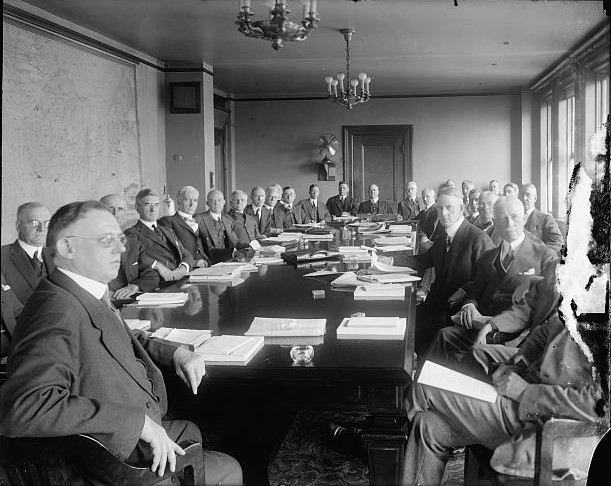
A Board of Governors meeting on January 1, 1922

There are eight committees.

- Committee on Board Affairs
- Committee on Consumer and Community Affairs
- Committee on Economic and Financial Monitoring and Research
- Committee on Financial Stability
- Committee on Federal Reserve Bank Affairs
- Committee on Bank Supervision
- Subcommittee on Smaller Regional and Community Banking
- Committee on Payments, Clearing, and Settlement

== List of governors ==
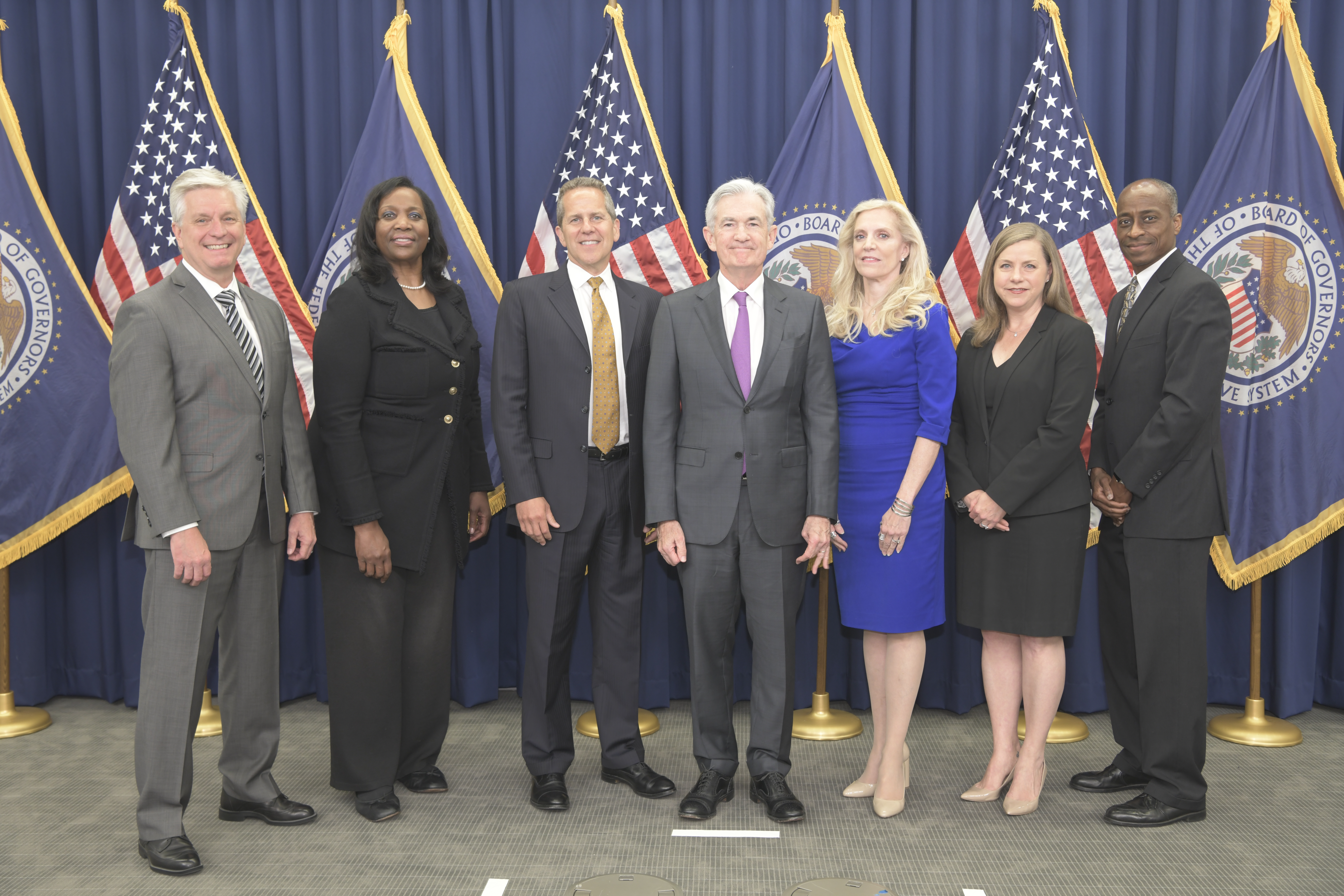
The Federal Reserve Board of Governors in 2022

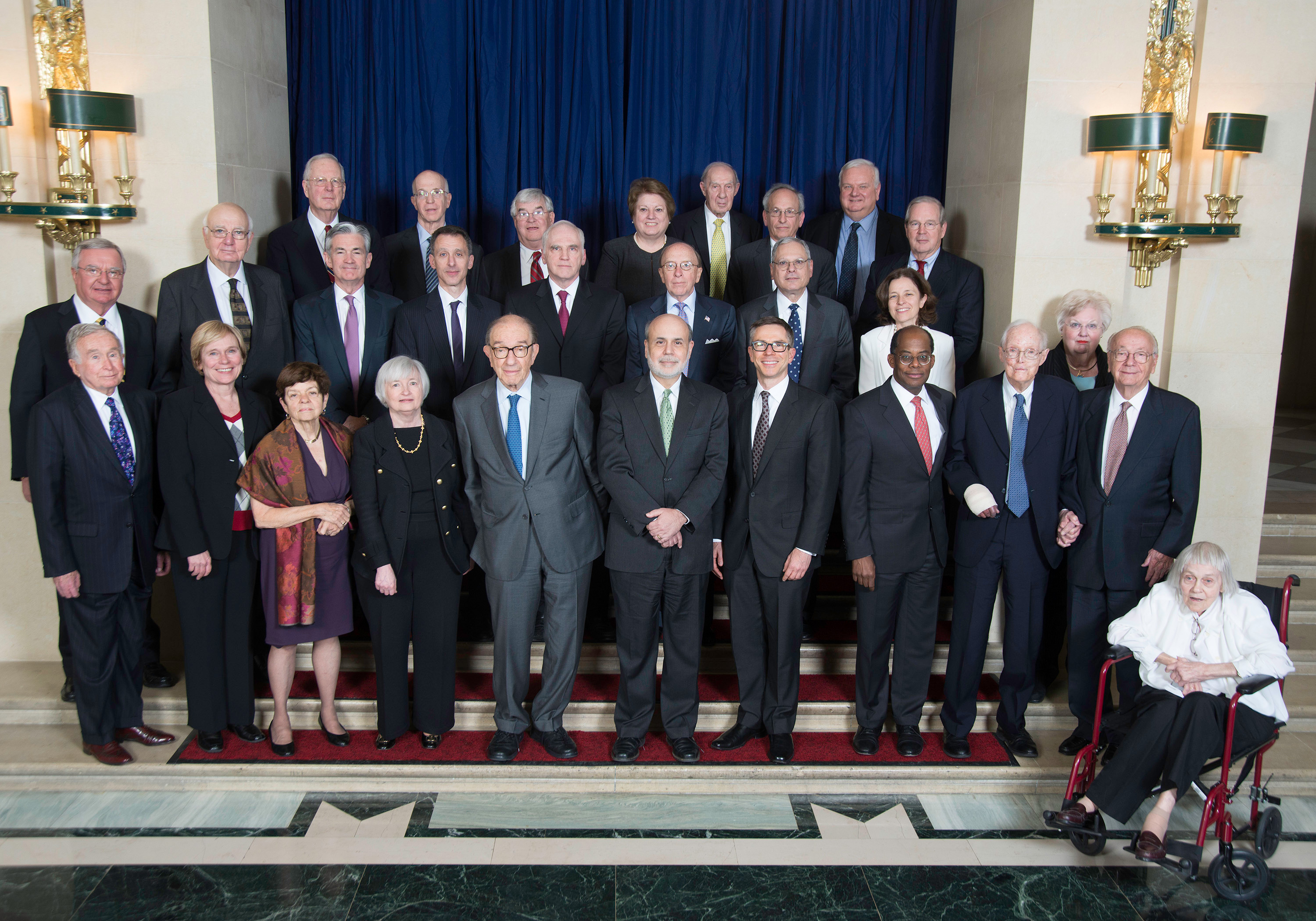
Current and living former governors as of May 1, 2014

The following is a list of past and present members of the Board of Governors of the Federal Reserve System. A governor serves for a fourteen-year term after appointment and a member who serves a full term may not be reappointed; when a governor completes an unexpired portion of a term, they may be reappointed. Since the Federal Reserve was established in 1914, the following people have served as governor.

Status

Denotes a current member
- Italics denotes date of term expiration

Name	Regional Bank	Start	End	Duration	Initial appointer	Departure reason
Charles Hamlin	Boston	August 10, 1914	February 3, 1936	21 years, 177 days	Woodrow Wilson (1913–1921)	Retired
Paul Warburg	New York	August 10, 1914	August 9, 1918	3 years, 364 days	Woodrow Wilson (1913–1921)	Term expired
Frederic Delano	Chicago	August 10, 1914	July 21, 1918	3 years, 345 days	Woodrow Wilson (1913–1921)	Resigned
William Harding	Atlanta	August 10, 1914	August 9, 1922	7 years, 364 days	Woodrow Wilson (1913–1921)	Term expired
Adolph Miller	San Francisco (1914–1934)	August 10, 1914	February 3, 1936	21 years, 177 days	Woodrow Wilson (1913–1921)	Retired
Adolph Miller	Richmond (1934–1936)	August 10, 1914	February 3, 1936	21 years, 177 days	Woodrow Wilson (1913–1921)	Retired
Albert Strauss	New York	October 26, 1918	March 15, 1920	1 year, 141 days	Woodrow Wilson (1913–1921)	Resigned
Henry Moehlenpah	Chicago	November 10, 1919	August 9, 1920	0 years, 273 days	Woodrow Wilson (1913–1921)	Term expired
Edmund Platt	New York	June 20, 1920	September 14, 1930	10 years, 86 days	Woodrow Wilson (1913–1921)	Resigned
David Wills	Cleveland	September 20, 1920	March 4, 1921	0 years, 165 days	Woodrow Wilson (1913–1921)	Term expired
John Mitchell	Minneapolis	May 12, 1921	May 12, 1923	2 years, 0 days	Warren G. Harding (1921–1923)	Resigned
Milo Campbell	Chicago	March 14, 1923	March 22, 1923	0 years, 8 days	Warren G. Harding (1921–1923)	Died in office
Daniel Crissinger	Cleveland	May 1, 1923	September 15, 1927	4 years, 137 days	Warren G. Harding (1921–1923)	Resigned
Edward Cunningham	Chicago	May 14, 1923	November 28, 1930	7 years, 198 days	Warren G. Harding (1921–1923)	Died in office
George James	St. Louis	May 14, 1923	February 3, 1936	12 years, 265 days	Warren G. Harding (1921–1923)	Retired
Roy Young	Minneapolis	October 4, 1927	August 31, 1930	2 years, 331 days	Calvin Coolidge (1923–1929)	Resigned
Eugene Meyer	New York	September 16, 1930	May 10, 1933	2 years, 236 days	Herbert Hoover (1929–1933)	Resigned
Wayland Magee	Kansas City	May 18, 1931	January 24, 1933	1 year, 251 days	Herbert Hoover (1929–1933)	Term expired
Eugene Black	Atlanta	May 19, 1933	August 15, 1934	1 year, 88 days	Franklin D. Roosevelt (1933–1945)	Resigned
Menc Szymczak	Chicago	June 14, 1933	May 31, 1961	27 years, 351 days	Franklin D. Roosevelt (1933–1945)	Resigned
John Thomas	Kansas City	June 14, 1933	February 10, 1936	2 years, 241 days	Franklin D. Roosevelt (1933–1945)	Retired
Marriner Eccles	San Francisco	November 15, 1934	July 14, 1951	16 years, 241 days	Franklin D. Roosevelt (1933–1945)	Resigned
Joseph Broderick	New York	February 3, 1936	September 30, 1937	1 year, 239 days	Franklin D. Roosevelt (1933–1945)	Resigned
John McKee	Cleveland	February 3, 1936	April 4, 1946	10 years, 60 days	Franklin D. Roosevelt (1933–1945)	Retired
Ronald Ransom	Atlanta	February 3, 1936	December 2, 1947	11 years, 302 days	Franklin D. Roosevelt (1933–1945)	Died in office
Ralph Morrison	Dallas	February 10, 1936	July 9, 1936	0 years, 150 days	Franklin D. Roosevelt (1933–1945)	Resigned
Chester Davis	Richmond	June 25, 1936	April 15, 1941	4 years, 294 days	Franklin D. Roosevelt (1933–1945)	Resigned
Ernest Draper	New York	March 30, 1938	September 1, 1950	12 years, 155 days	Franklin D. Roosevelt (1933–1945)	Retired
Rudolph Evans	Richmond	March 14, 1942	August 13, 1954	12 years, 152 days	Franklin D. Roosevelt (1933–1945)	Retired
Jake Vardaman	St. Louis	April 4, 1946	November 30, 1958	12 years, 240 days	Harry S. Truman (1945–1953)	Resigned
Larry Clayton	Boston	February 14, 1947	December 4, 1949	2 years, 293 days	Harry S. Truman (1945–1953)	Died in office
Thomas McCabe	Philadelphia	April 15, 1948	March 31, 1951	2 years, 350 days	Harry S. Truman (1945–1953)	Resigned
Edward Norton	Atlanta	September 1, 1950	January 31, 1952	1 year, 152 days	Harry S. Truman (1945–1953)	Resigned
Oliver S. Powell	Minneapolis	September 1, 1950	June 30, 1952	1 year, 303 days	Harry S. Truman (1945–1953)	Resigned
Bill Martin	New York	April 2, 1951	January 31, 1970	18 years, 304 days	Harry S. Truman (1945–1953)	Term expired
Abbot Mills	San Francisco	February 18, 1952	February 28, 1965	13 years, 10 days	Harry S. Truman (1945–1953)	Resigned
James Robertson	Kansas City	February 18, 1952	April 30, 1973	21 years, 71 days	Harry S. Truman (1945–1953)	Resigned
Canby Balderston	Philadelphia	August 12, 1954	February 28, 1966	11 years, 200 days	Dwight D. Eisenhower (1953–1961)	Retired
Paul Miller	Minneapolis	August 13, 1954	October 21, 1954	0 years, 69 days	Dwight D. Eisenhower (1953–1961)	Died in office
Charles Shepardson	Dallas	March 17, 1955	April 30, 1967	12 years, 44 days	Dwight D. Eisenhower (1953–1961)	Retired
George King	Atlanta	March 25, 1959	September 18, 1963	4 years, 177 days	Dwight D. Eisenhower (1953–1961)	Resigned
George Mitchell	Chicago	August 31, 1961	February 13, 1976	14 years, 166 days	John F. Kennedy (1961–1963)	Retired
Dewey Daane	Richmond	November 29, 1963	March 8, 1974	10 years, 99 days	John F. Kennedy (1961–1963)	Retired
Sherman Maisel	San Francisco	April 30, 1965	May 31, 1972	7 years, 31 days	Lyndon B. Johnson (1963–1969)	Retired
Andrew Brimmer	Philadelphia	March 9, 1966	August 31, 1974	8 years, 175 days	Lyndon B. Johnson (1963–1969)	Resigned
William Sherrill	Dallas	May 1, 1967	November 15, 1971	4 years, 198 days	Lyndon B. Johnson (1963–1969)	Resigned
Arthur Burns	New York	January 31, 1970	March 31, 1978	8 years, 59 days	Richard Nixon (1969–1974)	Resigned
John Sheehan	St. Louis	January 4, 1972	June 1, 1975	3 years, 148 days	Richard Nixon (1969–1974)	Resigned
Jeffrey Bucher	San Francisco	June 5, 1972	January 2, 1976	3 years, 211 days	Richard Nixon (1969–1974)	Resigned
Robert Holland	Kansas City	June 11, 1973	May 15, 1976	2 years, 339 days	Richard Nixon (1969–1974)	Resigned
Henry Wallich	Boston	March 8, 1974	December 15, 1986	12 years, 282 days	Richard Nixon (1969–1974)	Resigned
Philip Coldwell	Dallas	October 29, 1974	February 29, 1980	5 years, 123 days	Gerald Ford (1974–1977)	Retired
Philip Jackson	Atlanta	July 14, 1975	November 17, 1978	3 years, 126 days	Gerald Ford (1974–1977)	Resigned
Charles Partee	Richmond	January 5, 1976	February 7, 1986	10 years, 33 days	Gerald Ford (1974–1977)	Retired
Stephen Gardner	Philadelphia	February 13, 1976	November 19, 1978	2 years, 279 days	Gerald Ford (1974–1977)	Died in office
David Lilly	Minneapolis	June 1, 1976	February 24, 1978	1 year, 268 days	Gerald Ford (1974–1977)	Term expired
William Miller	San Francisco	March 8, 1978	August 6, 1979	1 year, 151 days	Jimmy Carter (1977–1981)	Resigned
Nancy Teeters	Chicago	September 18, 1978	June 27, 1984	5 years, 283 days	Jimmy Carter (1977–1981)	Resigned
Emmett Rice	New York	June 20, 1979	December 31, 1986	7 years, 194 days	Jimmy Carter (1977–1981)	Resigned
Frederick Schultz	Atlanta	July 27, 1979	February 11, 1982	2 years, 199 days	Jimmy Carter (1977–1981)	Resigned
Paul Volcker	Philadelphia	August 6, 1979	August 11, 1987	8 years, 5 days	Jimmy Carter (1977–1981)	Resigned
Lyle Gramley	Kansas City	May 28, 1980	September 1, 1985	5 years, 96 days	Jimmy Carter (1977–1981)	Resigned
Preston Martin	San Francisco	March 31, 1982	April 30, 1986	4 years, 30 days	Ronald Reagan (1981–1989)	Resigned
Martha Seger	Chicago	July 2, 1984	March 11, 1991	6 years, 252 days	Ronald Reagan (1981–1989)	Resigned
Wayne Angell	Kansas City	February 7, 1986	February 9, 1994	8 years, 2 days	Ronald Reagan (1981–1989)	Resigned
Manley Johnson	Richmond	February 7, 1986	August 3, 1990	4 years, 177 days	Ronald Reagan (1981–1989)	Resigned
Robert Heller	San Francisco	August 19, 1986	July 31, 1989	2 years, 346 days	Ronald Reagan (1981–1989)	Resigned
Edward W. Kelley	Dallas	May 26, 1987	December 31, 2001	14 years, 219 days	Ronald Reagan (1981–1989)	Resigned
Alan Greenspan	New York	August 11, 1987	January 31, 2006	18 years, 173 days	Ronald Reagan (1981–1989)	Term expired
John LaWare	Boston	August 15, 1988	April 30, 1995	6 years, 258 days	Ronald Reagan (1981–1989)	Resigned
David Mullins	St. Louis	May 21, 1990	February 14, 1994	3 years, 269 days	George H. W. Bush (1989–1993)	Resigned
Larry Lindsey	Richmond	November 26, 1991	February 5, 1997	5 years, 71 days	George H. W. Bush (1989–1993)	Resigned
Susan Phillips	Chicago	December 2, 1991	June 30, 1998	6 years, 210 days	George H. W. Bush (1989–1993)	Resigned
Alan Blinder	Philadelphia	June 27, 1994	January 31, 1996	1 year, 218 days	Bill Clinton (1993–2001)	Term expired
Janet Yellen	San Francisco	August 12, 1994	February 17, 1997	2 years, 189 days	Bill Clinton (1993–2001)	Resigned
Laurence Meyer	St. Louis	June 24, 1996	January 31, 2002	5 years, 221 days	Bill Clinton (1993–2001)	Term expired
Alice Rivlin	Philadelphia	June 25, 1996	July 16, 1999	3 years, 21 days	Bill Clinton (1993–2001)	Resigned
Roger Ferguson	Boston	November 5, 1997	April 28, 2006	8 years, 174 days	Bill Clinton (1993–2001)	Resigned
Edward Gramlich	Richmond	November 5, 1997	August 31, 2005	7 years, 299 days	Bill Clinton (1993–2001)	Resigned
Susan Bies	Chicago	December 7, 2001	March 30, 2007	5 years, 113 days	George W. Bush (2001–2009)	Resigned
Mark W. Olson	Minneapolis	December 7, 2001	June 30, 2006	4 years, 205 days	George W. Bush (2001–2009)	Resigned
Ben Bernanke	Atlanta	August 5, 2002	June 21, 2005	2 years, 320 days	George W. Bush (2001–2009)	Resigned
Don Kohn	Kansas City	August 5, 2002	September 1, 2010	8 years, 27 days	George W. Bush (2001–2009)	Resigned
Ben Bernanke	Atlanta	February 1, 2006	January 31, 2014	7 years, 364 days	George W. Bush (2001–2009)	Resigned
Kevin Warsh	New York	February 24, 2006	April 2, 2011	5 years, 37 days	George W. Bush (2001–2009)	Resigned
Randall Kroszner	Richmond	March 1, 2006	January 21, 2009	2 years, 326 days	George W. Bush (2001–2009)	Resigned
Rick Mishkin	Boston	September 5, 2006	August 31, 2008	1 year, 361 days	George W. Bush (2001–2009)	Resigned
Betsy Duke	Philadelphia	August 5, 2008	August 31, 2013	5 years, 26 days	George W. Bush (2001–2009)	Resigned
Dan Tarullo	Boston	January 28, 2009	April 5, 2017	8 years, 67 days	Barack Obama (2009–2017)	Resigned
Sarah Bloom Raskin	Richmond	October 4, 2010	March 13, 2014	3 years, 160 days	Barack Obama (2009–2017)	Resigned
Janet Yellen	San Francisco	October 4, 2010	February 3, 2018	7 years, 122 days	Barack Obama (2009–2017)	Resigned
Jerome Powell	Philadelphia	May 25, 2012	January 31, 2028	14 years, 166 days	Barack Obama (2009–2017)	Incumbent
Jeremy Stein	Chicago	May 30, 2012	May 28, 2014	1 year, 363 days	Barack Obama (2009–2017)	Resigned
Stan Fischer	New York	May 28, 2014	October 13, 2017	3 years, 138 days	Barack Obama (2009–2017)	Resigned
Lael Brainard	Richmond	June 16, 2014	February 18, 2023	8 years, 247 days	Barack Obama (2009–2017)	Resigned
Randy Quarles	Kansas City	October 13, 2017	December 25, 2021	4 years, 73 days	Donald Trump (2017–2021)	Resigned
Richard Clarida	Boston	September 17, 2018	January 14, 2022	3 years, 119 days	Donald Trump (2017–2021)	Resigned
Miki Bowman	St. Louis	November 26, 2018	January 31, 2034	7 years, 346 days	Donald Trump (2017–2021)	Incumbent
Chris Waller	Minneapolis	December 18, 2020	January 31, 2030	5 years, 324 days	Donald Trump (2017–2021)	Incumbent
Lisa Cook	Atlanta	May 23, 2022	January 31, 2038	4 years, 168 days	Joe Biden (2021–2025)	Incumbent
Philip Jefferson	New York	May 23, 2022	January 31, 2036	4 years, 168 days	Joe Biden (2021–2025)	Incumbent
Michael Barr	Chicago	July 19, 2022	January 31, 2032	4 years, 111 days	Joe Biden (2021–2025)	Incumbent
Adriana Kugler	Richmond	September 13, 2023	August 8, 2025	1 year, 329 days	Joe Biden (2021–2025)	Resigned
Stephen Miran	Richmond	September 16, 2025	May 22, 2026	0 years, 248 days	Donald Trump (2025–present)	Term expired
Kevin Warsh	San Francisco	May 22, 2026	January 31, 2040	169 days	Donald Trump (2025–present)	Incumbent

== Succession of seats ==
The Federal Reserve Board has seven seats subject to Senate confirmation, separate from a member's term as chair or vice chair.

Seat 1
Established August 10, 1914 per Federal Reserve Act
Hamlin	August 10, 1914 – February 3, 1936
Board reorganized February 3, 1936
Morrison	February 10, 1936 – July 9, 1936
Clayton	February 14, 1947 – December 4, 1949
O. Powell	September 1, 1950 – June 30, 1952
Balderston	August 12, 1954 – February 28, 1966
Brimmer	March 9, 1966 – August 31, 1974
Coldwell	October 29, 1974 – February 29, 1980
Gramley	May 28, 1980 – September 1, 1985
Angell	February 7, 1986 – February 9, 1994
Yellen	August 12, 1994 – February 17, 1997
Gramlich	November 5, 1997 – August 31, 2005
Kroszner	March 1, 2006 – January 21, 2009
Tarullo	January 28, 2009 – April 5, 2017
Clarida	September 17, 2018 – January 14, 2022
Jefferson	May 23, 2022 – present

Seat 2
Established August 10, 1914 per Federal Reserve Act
Warburg	August 10, 1914 – August 9, 1918
Strauss	October 26, 1918 – March 15, 1920
Platt	June 8, 1920 – September 14, 1930
E. Meyer	September 16, 1930 – May 10, 1933
Black	May 19, 1933 – August 15, 1934
Eccles	November 15, 1934 – February 1, 1936
Board reorganized February 3, 1936
Davis	June 25, 1936 – April 15, 1941
Evans	March 14, 1942 – August 13, 1954
P. Miller	August 13, 1954 – October 21, 1954
Shepardson	March 17, 1955 – April 30, 1967
Sherrill	May 1, 1967 – November 15, 1971
Sheehan	January 4, 1972 – June 1, 1975
Jackson	July 14, 1975 – November 17, 1978
Schultz	July 27, 1979 – February 11, 1982
P. Martin	March 31, 1982 – April 30, 1986
Heller	August 19, 1986 – July 31, 1989
Mullins	May 21, 1990 – February 14, 1994
Blinder	June 27, 1994 – January 31, 1996
Rivlin	June 25, 1996 – July 16, 1999
Olson	December 7, 2001 – June 30, 2006
Yellen	October 4, 2010 – February 3, 2018
Cook	May 23, 2022 – present

Seat 3
Established August 10, 1914 per Federal Reserve Act
Delano	August 10, 1914 – July 21, 1918
Moehlenpah	November 10, 1919 – August 9, 1920
Wills	September 29, 1920 – March 4, 1921
J. Mitchell	May 12, 1921 – May 12, 1923
James	May 14, 1923 – February 3, 1936
Board reorganized February 3, 1936
Ransom	February 3, 1936 – December 2, 1947
McCabe	April 15, 1948 – March 31, 1951
W. Martin	April 2, 1951 – January 31, 1970
Burns	February 1, 1970 – March 31, 1978
Teeters	September 18, 1978 – June 27, 1984
Seger	July 2, 1984 – March 11, 1991
Phillips	December 2, 1991 – June 30, 1998
Bies	December 7, 2001 – March 30, 2007
Duke	August 5, 2008 – August 31, 2013
Brainard	June 16, 2014 – February 18, 2023
Kugler	September 13, 2023 – August 8, 2025
Miran	September 16, 2025 – May 22, 2026
Warsh	May 22, 2026 – present

Seat 4
Established August 10, 1914 per Federal Reserve Act
Harding	August 10, 1914 – August 9, 1922
Crissinger	May 1, 1923 – September 15, 1927
Young	October 4, 1927 – August 31, 1930
Szymczak	June 14, 1933 – February 1, 1936
Board reorganized February 3, 1936
Eccles	February 1, 1936 – July 14, 1951
Mills	February 18, 1952 – February 28, 1965
Maisel	April 30, 1965 – May 31, 1972
Bucher	June 5, 1972 – January 2, 1976
Partee	January 5, 1976 – February 7, 1986
Johnson	February 7, 1986 – August 3, 1990
Lindsey	November 26, 1991 – February 5, 1997
Ferguson	November 5, 1997 – April 28, 2006
Mishkin	September 5, 2006 – August 31, 2008
J. Powell	May 25, 2012 – present

Seat 5
Established August 10, 1914 per Federal Reserve Act
A. Miller	August 10, 1914 – February 3, 1936
Board reorganized February 3, 1936
McKee	February 3, 1936 – April 4, 1946
Vardaman	April 4, 1946 – November 30, 1958
King	March 25, 1959 – September 18, 1963
Daane	November 29, 1963 – March 4, 1974
Wallich	March 8, 1974 – December 15, 1986
LaWare	August 15, 1988 – April 30, 1995
L. Meyer	June 24, 1996 – January 31, 2002
Kohn	August 5, 2002 – September 1, 2010
Bloom Raskin	October 4, 2010 – March 13, 2014
Waller	December 18, 2020 – present

Seat 6
Established June 3, 1922 per Act of June 3, 1922
Campbell	March 14, 1923 – March 22, 1923
Cunningham	May 14, 1923 – November 28, 1930
Magee	May 18, 1931 – January 24, 1933
Thomas	June 14, 1933 – February 10, 1936
Board reorganized February 3, 1936
Szymczak	February 10, 1936 – May 31, 1961
G. Mitchell	August 31, 1961 – February 13, 1976
Gardner	February 13, 1976 – November 19, 1978
Rice	June 20, 1979 – December 31, 1986
Kelley	May 26, 1987 – December 31, 2001
Bernanke	August 5, 2002 – June 21, 2005
Warsh	February 24, 2006 – April 2, 2011
Stein	May 30, 2012 – May 28, 2014
Quarles	October 13, 2017 – December 25, 2021
Barr	July 19, 2022 – present

Seat 7
Established August 23, 1935 per Banking Act of 1935
Broderick	February 13, 1936 – September 30, 1937
Draper	March 30, 1938 – September 1, 1950
Norton	September 1, 1950 – January 31, 1952
Robertson	February 18, 1952 – April 30, 1973
Holland	June 11, 1973 – May 15, 1976
Lilly	June 1, 1976 – February 24, 1978
G. W. Miller	March 8, 1978 – August 9, 1979
Volcker	August 9, 1979 – August 11, 1987
Greenspan	August 11, 1987 – January 31, 2006
Bernanke	February 1, 2006 – January 31, 2014
Fischer	May 28, 2014 – October 16, 2017
Bowman	November 26, 2018 – present

== Structure of leadership ==
The chair, vice chair, and vice chair for supervision are appointed by the president from among the sitting members of the board to serve a four-year term and they can be renominated as many times as the president chooses, subject to Senate confirmation each time, until their terms on the Board of Governors expire.

Chair
Established August 10, 1914 per Federal Reserve Act
Hamlin	August 10, 1914 – August 9, 1916
Harding	August 10, 1916 – August 9, 1922
Crissinger	May 1, 1923 – September 15, 1927
Young	October 4, 1927 – August 31, 1930
E. Meyer	September 16, 1930 – May 10, 1933
Black	May 19, 1933 – August 15, 1934
Eccles	November 15, 1934 – January 31, 1948
McCabe	April 15, 1948 – March 31, 1951
W. Martin	April 2, 1951 – January 31, 1970
Burns	February 1, 1970 – January 31, 1978
G. W. Miller	March 8, 1978 – August 6, 1979
Volcker	August 6, 1979 – August 11, 1987
Greenspan	August 11, 1987 – January 31, 2006
Bernanke	February 1, 2006 – January 31, 2014
Yellen	February 3, 2014 – February 3, 2018
J. Powell	February 5, 2018 – May 22, 2026
Warsh	May 22, 2026 – present

Vice Chair
Established August 10, 1914 per Federal Reserve Act
Delano	August 10, 1914 – August 9, 1916
Warburg	August 10, 1916 – August 9, 1918
Strauss	October 26, 1918 – March 15, 1920
Platt	July 23, 1920 – September 14, 1930
Thomas	August 21, 1934 – February 10, 1936
Ransom	August 6, 1936 – December 2, 1947
Balderston	March 11, 1955 – February 28, 1966
Robertson	March 1, 1966 – April 30, 1973
G. Mitchell	March 1, 1973 – February 13, 1976
Gardner	February 13, 1976 – November 19, 1978
Schultz	July 27, 1979 – February 11, 1982
P. Martin	March 31, 1982 – April 30, 1986
Johnson	August 4, 1986 – August 3, 1990
Mullins	July 24, 1991 – February 14, 1994
Blinder	June 27, 1994 – January 31, 1996
Rivlin	June 25, 1996 – July 16, 1999
Ferguson	October 5, 1999 – April 28, 2006
Kohn	June 23, 2006 – June 23, 2010
Yellen	October 4, 2010 – February 3, 2014
Fischer	June 16, 2014 – October 16, 2017
Clarida	September 17, 2018 – January 14, 2022
Brainard	May 23, 2022 – February 18, 2023
Jefferson	September 13, 2023 – present

Vice Chair for Supervision
Established July 21, 2010 per Dodd–Frank Act
Quarles	October 13, 2017 – October 13, 2021
Barr	July 19, 2022 – February 28, 2025
Bowman	June 9, 2025 – present

== Nominations, confirmations, and resignations ==
=== Obama administration ===
In late December 2011, President Barack Obama nominated Jeremy C. Stein, a Harvard University finance professor and a Democrat, and Jerome Powell, formerly of Dillon Read, Bankers Trust and the Carlyle Group, a Republican. Both candidates also have Treasury Department experience in the Obama and George H. W. Bush administrations respectively.

"Obama administration officials [had] regrouped to identify Fed candidates after Peter Diamond, a Nobel Prize-winning economist, withdrew his nomination to the board in June [2011] in the face of Republican opposition. Richard Clarida, a potential nominee who was a Treasury official under George W. Bush, pulled out of consideration in August [2011]", one account of the December nominations noted. The two other Obama nominees in 2011, Janet Yellen and Sarah Bloom Raskin, were confirmed in September. One of the vacancies was created in 2011 with the resignation of Kevin Warsh, who took office in 2006 to fill the unexpired term ending January 31, 2018, and resigned his position effective March 31, 2011. In March 2012, U.S. senator David Vitter (R, LA) said he would oppose Obama's Stein and Powell nominations, dampening near-term hopes for approval. However, Senate leaders reached a deal, paving the way for affirmative votes on the two nominees in May 2012 and bringing the board to full strength for the first time since 2006with Duke's service after term end. Later, on January 6, 2014, the United States Senate confirmed Yellen's nomination to be chair of the Federal Reserve Board of Governors; she was the first woman to hold the position. Subsequently, President Obama nominated Stanley Fischer to replace Yellen as the vice-chair.

In April 2014, Stein announced he was leaving to return to Harvard on May 28 with four years remaining on his term. At the time of the announcement, the FOMC "already is down three members as it awaits the Senate confirmation of ... Fischer and Lael Brainard, and as [President] Obama has yet to name a replacement for ... Duke. ... Powell is still serving as he awaits his confirmation for a second term."

Allan R. Landon, former president and CEO of the Bank of Hawaii, was nominated in early 2015 by President Obama to the board.

In July 2015, President Obama nominated University of Michigan economist Kathryn M. Dominguez to fill the second vacancy on the board. The Senate had not yet acted on Landon's confirmation by the time of the second nomination.

Daniel Tarullo submitted his resignation from the board on February 10, 2017, effective on or around April 5, 2017.

=== Unsuccessful ===
The below table shows those who were formally nominated to fill a vacant seat but failed to be confirmed by the Senate.

In addition some have been announced but never formally nominated before being withdrawn from consideration. Alicia Munnell, representing Boston, was announced to fill LaWare's seat by Bill Clinton in 1995. Felix Rohatyn (district unknown) was announced to fill Alan Blinder's as vice chair and his seat in 1996. Steve Moore and Herman Cain were announced to fill Bloom Raskin and Yellen's seats (without specifying which seat or district) by Donald Trump in 2019.

Nominee	Regional Bank	Year	Vacator	President	Outcome
Carol Parry	Chicago	1999	Susan Phillips	Bill Clinton	No action
Larry Klane	Richmond	2007	Mark Olson	George W. Bush	No action
Peter Diamond	Chicago	2010	Rick Mishkin	Barack Obama	No action
Peter Diamond	Chicago	2010	Rick Mishkin	Barack Obama	No action
Peter Diamond	Chicago	2011	Rick Mishkin	Barack Obama	Withdrawn
Allan Landon	San Francisco	2015	Sarah Bloom Raskin	Barack Obama	No action
Kathryn M. Dominguez	Chicago	2015	Jeremy Stein	Barack Obama	No action
Marvin Goodfriend	Philadelphia	2017	Sarah Bloom Raskin	Donald Trump	No action
Marvin Goodfriend	Philadelphia	2018	Sarah Bloom Raskin	Donald Trump	No action
Nellie Liang	Chicago	2018	Janet Yellen	Donald Trump	No action
Judy Shelton	San Francisco	2020	Janet Yellen	Donald Trump	No action
Judy Shelton	San Francisco	2021	Janet Yellen	Donald Trump	Withdrawn
Sarah Bloom Raskin	Not specified	2022	Randy Quarles	Joe Biden	Withdrawn

== See also ==
- Banking Act of 1933 and 1935 - created and gave voting rights to the seven Federal Reserve Board of Governors appointed by the president and 12 Federal Open Market Committee members.
