= Stephen Gardner =

American banker and government official (1921–1978)

Stephen S. Gardner
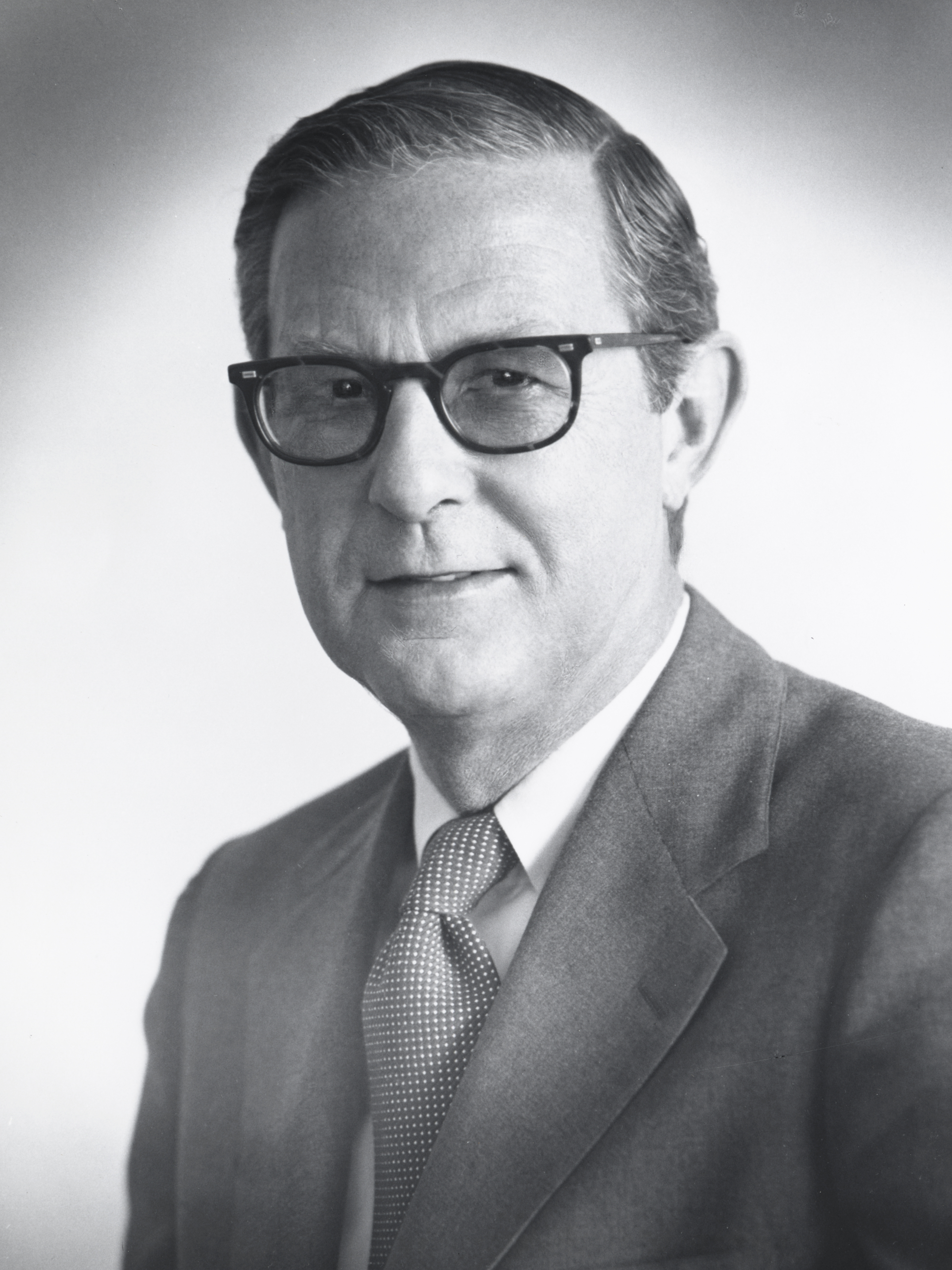

10th Vice Chairman of the Federal Reserve
- In office February 13, 1976 – November 19, 1978
- President: Gerald Ford; Jimmy Carter
- Preceded by: George W. Mitchell
- Succeeded by: Frederick H. Schultz

Member of the Federal Reserve Board of Governors
- In office February 13, 1976 – November 19, 1978
- President: Gerald Ford; Jimmy Carter
- Preceded by: George W. Mitchell
- Succeeded by: Emmett J. Rice

Personal details
- Born: Stephen Symmes Gardner; December 26, 1921 Wakefield, Massachusetts, U.S.
- Died: November 19, 1978 (aged 56) Washington, D.C., U.S.
- Political party: Republican
- Education: Harvard University, BA, MBA

Stephen S. Gardner (December 26, 1921 – November 19, 1978) was an American businessman who served as the 10th vice chairman of the Federal Reserve from 1976 until his death in 1978.

== Career ==
Gardner was chairman of the Girard Bank in Philadelphia. In 1973, he was appointed to an advisory group of Philadelphia business leaders by mayor Frank Rizzo. In 1974, he was given the Police Athletic League award for his bank's "distinguished service and leadership" on behalf of the group.

In 1976, he was appointed Vice Chair of the Federal Reserve by President Gerald Ford on a fourteen-year term.

== Personal life ==
Gardner was born on December 26, 1921, in Wakefield, Massachusetts, a small town in Massachusetts. He and his wife Consuelo had three sons (Seth T., Stephen Symmes Jr., and Pierce S.) and two daughters (Susan and Hillary). His son Seth married Elizabeth Tracy Perkins, the daughter of W. B. Saunders' vice president Sherman Evarts Perkins.

He died on November 19, 1978, from cancer.

Government offices
Preceded by George W. Mitchell	Member of the Federal Reserve Board of Governors; 1976–1978	Succeeded by Emmett J. Rice
Preceded by George W. Mitchell	Vice Chair of the Federal Reserve; 1976–1978	Succeeded by Frederick H. Schultz
