= H. Robert Heller =

German–American economist and corporate executive (born 1940)

Robert Heller
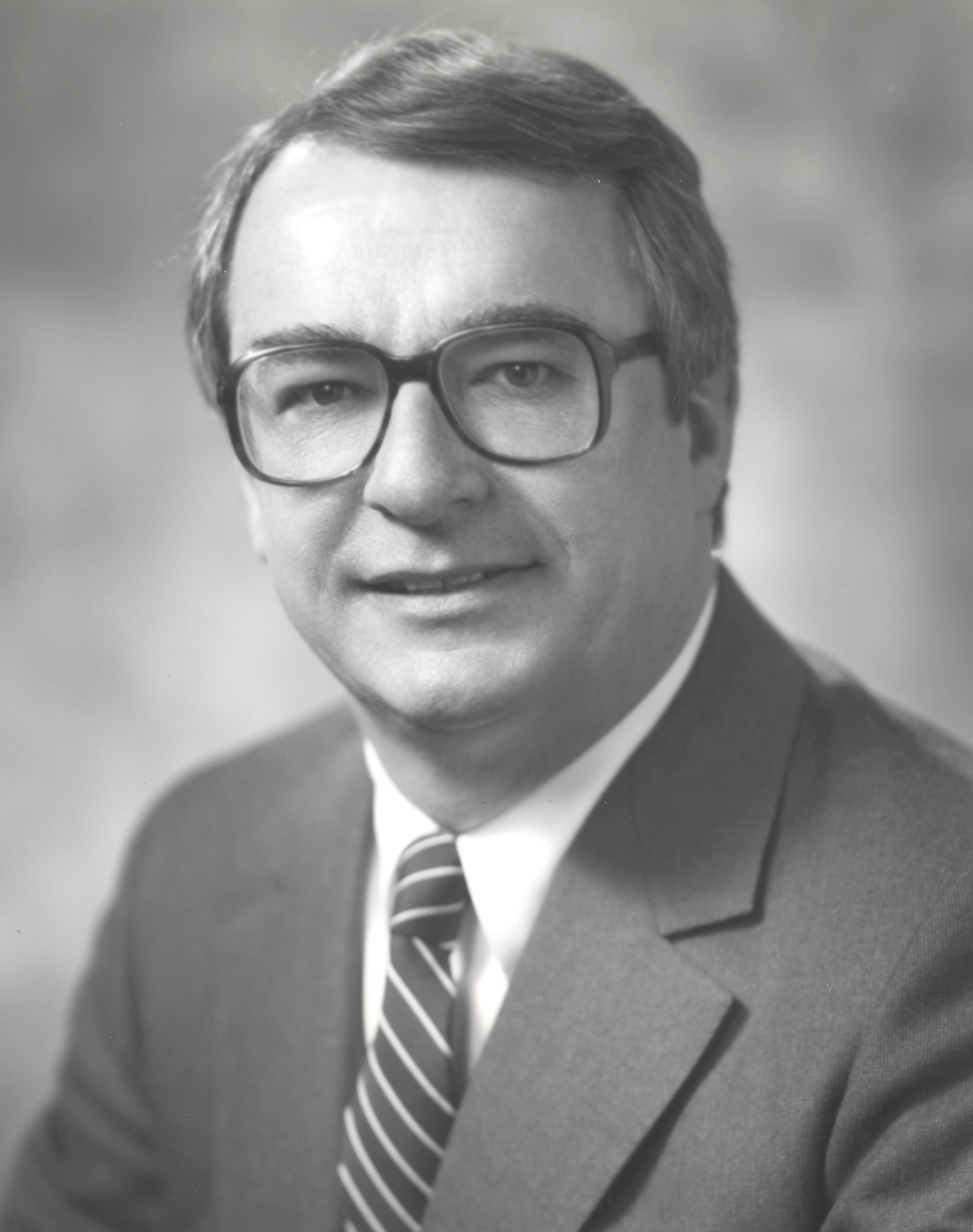

Member of the Federal Reserve Board of Governors
- In office August 19, 1986 – July 31, 1989
- President: Ronald Reagan; George H. W. Bush
- Preceded by: Preston Martin
- Succeeded by: David W. Mullins Jr.

Personal details
- Born: Heinz Robert Heller; January 8, 1940 (age 86) Cologne, Germany
- Party: Republican
- Education: Parsons College (BA); University of Minnesota, Twin Cities (MA); University of California, Berkeley (PhD)

Heinz Robert Heller (born January 8, 1940) is an economist who served as a governor of the Federal Reserve System and as president of VISA U.S.A. Inc.

== Education ==
Heller was born in Cologne, Germany. After an early education in Cologne, he emigrated in 1960 to the United States and obtained his B.A. in 1961 from Parsons College, M.A. in economics from the University of Minnesota (1962) and his Ph.D. in economics from the University of California, Berkeley (1965).

== Career ==
Heller began his career as an academic, first as assistant professor (1965–68) and associate professor (1968–71) of economics at the University of California, Los Angeles and then as professor of economics at the University of Hawaii (1971–74), where he served as chairman of the economics department for two years. From 1974 to 1978, he was chief of the Financial Studies Division of the Research Department of the International Monetary Fund in Washington, D.C., in charge of the IMF's monetary and financial research program. In 1978, he joined Bank of America in San Francisco as senior vice president and director of international economic research. At Bank of America, he was a member of the Management Advisory Council, the International Money Policy Committee, the Trust and Investment Policy Committee, the International Banking Council and the Policy Research Council. He also was chairman of both the Foreign Exchange Outlook Committee and the Country Risk Rating Committee.

President Reagan nominated Heller in 1986 as a member of the board of governors of the Federal Reserve System and he was confirmed unanimously by the U.S. Senate

At the Federal Reserve he served as the administrative governor and the chairman of the Committee on Bank Supervision and Regulation. He was a member of the Federal Financial Institutions Examination Council and a Federal Reserve delegate to the Organization for Economic Co-Operation and Development in Paris. As the Administrative Governor, he was responsible for the creation of the official flag of the Federal Reserve, which he designed with the help of his daughter Kimberly Allison.

At the Federal Reserve, he championed giving investment banking powers to commercial banks, allowing U.S. banks to accept foreign currency deposits and the elimination of interstate banking barriers. He joined VISA International in 1989 as executive vice president in charge of global finance, audit and risk management. In 1991 he was appointed president and CEO of VISA U.S.A.. Heller was honored by the American Banker as a "Leader of the Bankcard Business"

== Other activities ==
Heller currently serves on the boards of Bank of Marin, Sonic Automotive Inc. and several private corporations. He is a past chairman of Marin General Hospital and a Staff Commodore of the San Francisco Yacht Club.

== Publications ==
- International Trade, Prentice Hall, Englewood Cliffs, 1968, Library of Congress Card No. 68-17211, 2nd ed. 1973 ISBN 0-13-473918-3 (Japanese ed. 1969 and 1973, Spanish ed. 1970 and 1983, German ed. 1975, 1992 and 1997, Portuguese ed. 1978, Malay ed. 1982)
- The Economic System, The Macmillan Co., 1972, Library of Congress Card No. 72-163232 (Portuguese ed. 1977)
- International Monetary Economics, Prentice Hall, Englewood Cliffs, 1974 ISBN 0-13-473140-9 (Japanese ed. 1974, Malay ed. 1982)
- Japanese Investments in the United States (with Emily E. Heller), Praeger Publishers, New York, N.Y. 1974, ISBN 0-275-09670-X
- The Unlikely Governor, Maybridge Press, 2015, ISBN 978-0-9964390-2-2

Government offices
Preceded by Preston Martin	Member of the Federal Reserve Board of Governors; 1986–1989	Succeeded by David W. Mullins Jr.
