= Emmett J. Rice =

American economist and bank executive (1919–2011)

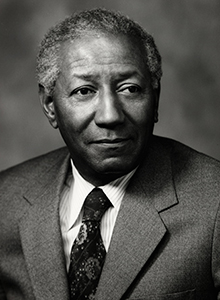

Member of the Federal Reserve Board of Governors
- In office June 20, 1979 – December 31, 1986
- President: Jimmy Carter; Ronald Reagan
- Preceded by: Stephen Gardner
- Succeeded by: Edward W. Kelley Jr.

Personal details
- Born: Emmett John Rice; December 21, 1919 Florence, South Carolina, U.S.
- Died: March 10, 2011 (aged 91) Camas, Washington, U.S.
- Party: Democratic
- Spouse: Lois Dickson (divorced)
- Relatives: Susan Rice (daughter); E. John Rice Jr. (son); Kiki Rice (granddaughter)
- Education: City University of New York, City College (BBA, MBA); University of California, Berkeley (PhD)

Emmett John Rice (December 21, 1919 – March 10, 2011) was an American economist, academic, bank executive, and member of the Federal Reserve Board of Governors. He served with the Tuskegee Airmen during World War II, taught at Cornell University during the 1950s, and was a noted expert in the monetary systems of developing countries. Susan Rice, former United States Ambassador to the United Nations and National Security Advisor to Barack Obama, is his daughter.

== Background ==
Rice was born in Florence, South Carolina. He was the son of Sue Pearl (née Suber) and the Rev. Ulysses Simpson Rice (1875–1927). His father died when he was seven years old. He attended segregated schools before his family moved to New York City when he was 16. Rice studied at the City College of New York, receiving a B.B.A. in 1941 and an M.B.A. in 1942 at City College of New York. He then joined the U.S. Army Air Force in World War II, serving with the Tuskegee Airmen. After the war, he earned his Ph.D. in economics at the University of California, Berkeley and was a Fulbright scholar in India. Rice integrated the Berkeley Fire Department as a student by becoming its first Black American fireman. He next taught economics at Cornell as the university's only Black assistant professor. He later served as a governor of the Federal Reserve from 1979 to 1986.

== Career ==
Rice was a research assistant in economics at Berkeley from 1950 to 1951 then, was a teaching assistant in economics in 1953 and 1954. In between, he spent 1952 as a research associate at the Reserve Bank of India as a Fulbright Fellow.

From 1954 to 1960, Rice was an assistant professor of economics at Cornell University. From 1960 to 1962, he took leave from Cornell to work as an economist at the Federal Reserve Bank of New York and he then went on to be an adviser to the Central Bank of Nigeria in Lagos in 1963 and 1964.

From 1964 to 1966, Rice was deputy director, then acting director, of the Treasury Department's Office of Developing Nations. From 1966 to 1970, he was U.S. Alternate Executive Director for the International Bank for Reconstruction and Development (World Bank), the International Development Association, and the International Finance Corporation.

In 1970, Rice left the U.S. Treasury department to be executive director of the Mayor's Economic Development Committee for Washington, D.C. In 1972 he left public service to assume the position of senior vice president of the National Bank of Washington.

President Jimmy Carter appointed Rice to the Federal Reserve Board of Governors in 1979, making him its second African American member, following Andrew Brimmer. Rice served on the board for seven years under Chairman Paul Volcker and resigned in 1986.

== Death ==
Rice died at the age of 91 of congestive heart failure on March 10, 2011, at his home in Camas, Washington.

Government offices
Preceded by Stephen Gardner	Member of the Federal Reserve Board of Governors; 1979–1986	Succeeded by Edward W. Kelley Jr.
