= PMI Group =

Holding company whose primary subsidiary is the PMI Mortgage Insurance Co

- Industry: Mortgage Insurance
- Founded: 1972; 54 years ago
- Founder: Preston Martin
- Fate: In Receivership
- Headquarters: Walnut Creek, California, United States
- Website: www.pmi-us.com

The PMI Group is a holding company whose primary subsidiary is the PMI Mortgage Insurance Co. (PMI). The company was founded in 1972 by Preston Martin and is headquartered in Walnut Creek, California.

PMI has a 50% equity ownership in CMG Mortgage Insurance Company, founded in 1994 as a JV with CUNA Mutual Group, and CMG Mortgage Assurance Company (collectively CMG MI), a provider of private mortgage insurance to the credit union industry.

In October 2011, Arizona insurance regulators seized PMI's main subsidiary and reduced claim payouts to 50% of the claim made with the balance of each claim being deferred. Shortly afterward, PMI filed for bankruptcy.
