= Edward W. Kelley =

American economist and government official (1932–2016)

Member of the Federal Reserve Board of Governors
- In office May 26, 1987 – December 31, 2001
- President: Ronald Reagan; George H. W. Bush; Bill Clinton; George W. Bush
- Preceded by: Emmett J. Rice
- Succeeded by: Ben Bernanke

Personal details
- Born: Edward W. Kelley; January 27, 1932 Eugene, Oregon, U.S.
- Died: December 4, 2016 (aged 84) Washington D.C., U.S.
- Party: Republican
- Education: Rice University (BA); Harvard University (MBA)

Edward W. Kelley (January 27, 1932 – December 4, 2016) was an American economist who served as a member of the Federal Reserve Board of Governors from 1987 to 2001.

Government offices
Preceded by Emmett J. Rice	Member of the Federal Reserve Board of Governors; 1987–2001	Succeeded by Ben Bernanke
