= C. Canby Balderston =

American economist, lawyer and businessman (1897–1979)

Canby Balderston
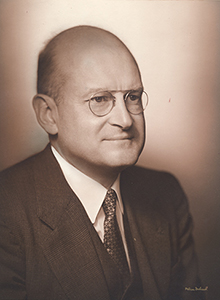

7th Vice Chairman of the Federal Reserve
- In office March 11, 1955 – February 28, 1966
- President: Dwight D. Eisenhower; John F. Kennedy; Lyndon B. Johnson
- Preceded by: Ronald Ransom
- Succeeded by: James Robertson

Member of the Federal Reserve Board of Governors
- In office August 12, 1954 – February 28, 1966
- President: Dwight D. Eisenhower; John F. Kennedy; Lyndon B. Johnson
- Preceded by: Oliver S. Powell
- Succeeded by: Andrew Brimmer

Personal details
- Born: Caleb Canby Balderston; February 1, 1897; Kennett Square, Pennsylvania, U.S.
- Died: September 9, 1979 (aged 82); Media, Pennsylvania, U.S.
- Political party: Republican
- Spouse: Gertrude Emery (m. 1922; d. 1941) Ida Roberts Smedley (m. 1942)
- Children: 2
- Parents: John Lloyd Balderston (1849–1921) (father); Anna E. Marshall Balderston (1856–1925) (mother)
- Education: University of Pennsylvania (BA, MA, PhD, LLB)

C. Canby Balderston (February 1, 1897 – September 9, 1979) was an American economist, lawyer and businessman who served as the 7th vice chairman of the Federal Reserve from 1955 to 1966. Prior to his term as vice chairman, Balderston served as a member of the Federal Reserve Board of Governors, taking office in 1954.

He died on September 9, 1979, in Media, Pennsylvania at age 82.

Government offices
Preceded by Oliver S. Powell	Member of the Federal Reserve Board of Governors; 1954–1966	Succeeded by Andrew Brimmer
Preceded by Ronald Ransom	Vice Chair of the Federal Reserve; 1955–1966	Succeeded by James Robertson
