= Preston Martin =

American economist and banker (1923–2007)

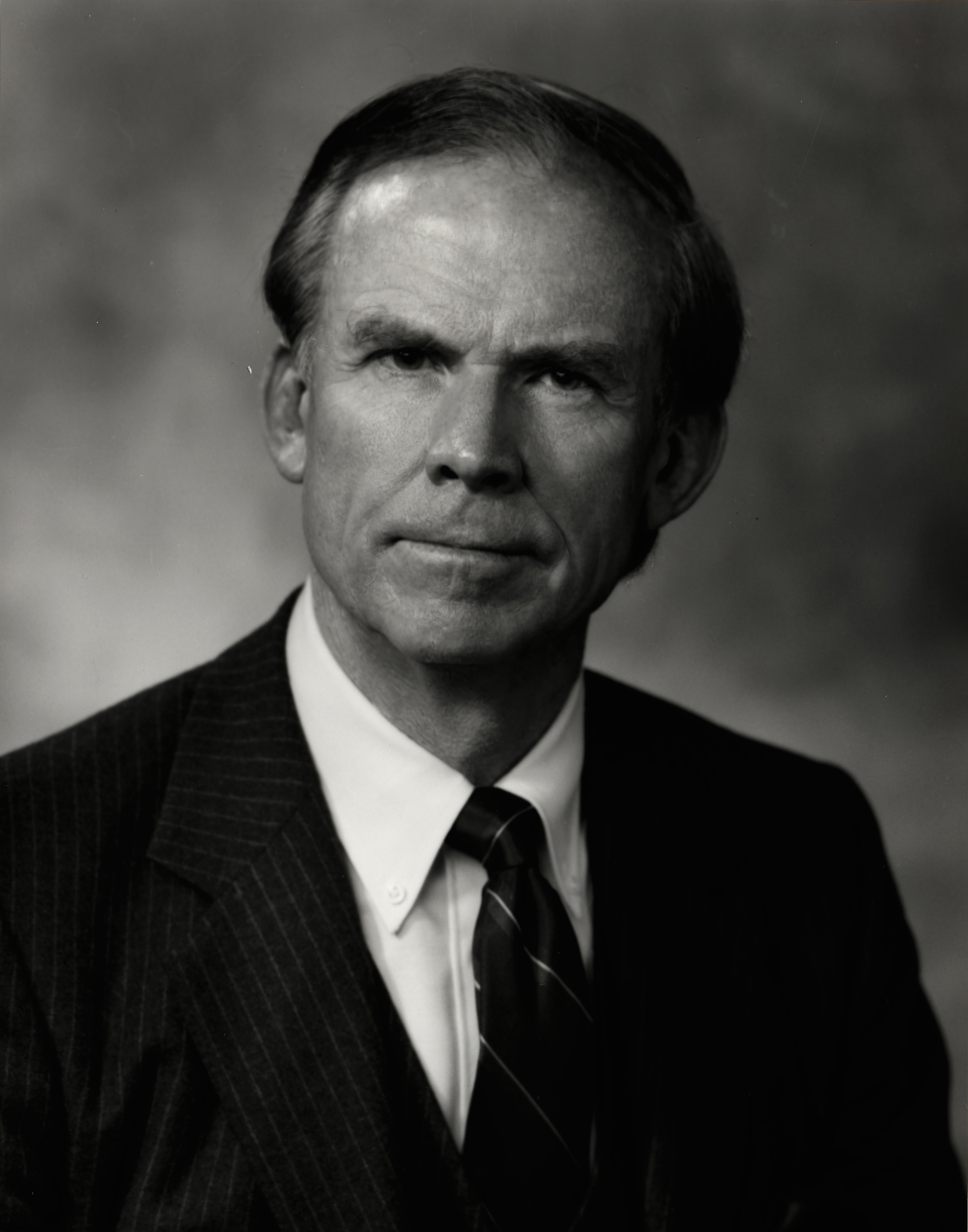

12th Vice Chairman of the Federal Reserve
- In office March 31, 1982 – April 30, 1986
- President: Ronald Reagan
- Preceded by: Frederick H. Schultz
- Succeeded by: Manuel H. Johnson

Member of the Federal Reserve Board of Governors
- In office March 31, 1982 – April 30, 1986
- President: Ronald Reagan
- Preceded by: Frederick H. Schultz
- Succeeded by: H. Robert Heller

Personal details
- Born: Preston B. Martin; December 5, 1923 Los Angeles, California, U.S.
- Died: May 30, 2007 (aged 83) San Francisco, California, U.S.
- Party: Republican
- Education: University of Southern California (BA, MBA); Indiana University Bloomington (PhD)

Preston Martin (December 5, 1923 – May 30, 2007) was an American economist and banker who served as the 12th vice chairman of the Federal Reserve from 1982 to 1986.

== Education ==
Preston Martin graduated from the University of Southern California in 1947, before completed an Master of Business Administration in finance from the same university in 1948 and earned his PhD in monetary economics from Indiana University Bloomington in 1952.

== Career ==
He was the head of the Economic Department at University of Southern California, founded ERG Economic Research Group doing work for Lockheed, among others, while simultaneously writing a book on Housing and Urban Development, as well as serving on the board of directors at Lincoln Savings and Loan. He then served as California's Saving and Loan Commissioner between 1967 and 1969 under then Governor Ronald Reagan. His exemplary performance at the state level led to President Nixon appointing him as chairman and chief operating officer of the Federal Home Loan Bank Board in 1969. He was involved in creating Freddie Mac while working in this position. Here also he initiated the 5% mortgage loan bill which was passed, almost as a token because the opposition did not think it would work. There was no entity to insure those loans. Shortly thereafter, when he left the government in 1972, he founded PMI Mortgage Insurance Company to do just that, insure the 5% mortgage loans which would enable thousands of Americans to purchase their first homes.

Martin later established Seraco Enterprises, a subsidiary of Sears, Roebuck and Company based in the Sears Tower in Chicago, and was appointed to the board of directors of Sears. When Sears merged with Coldwell Banker, in 1982, President Reagan appointed him as vice chairman of the Federal Reserve for four years and as a member for 14 years. During his years at the Federal Reserve, Martin was known as a Reagan loyalist who challenged Chairman Paul Volcker's tough anti-inflation policies.

Martin was considered as a possible successor to Paul Volcker as chairman of the Federal Reserve, but Alan Greenspan was appointed instead. Martin returned to San Francisco and created Western Holdings, acquiring failing savings & loans all around the Pacific rim. He died of cancer, aged 83, in San Francisco, survived by his son Pier Preston Martin, also a banker.

Government offices
Preceded by Frederick H. Schultz	Member of the Federal Reserve Board of Governors; 1982–1986	Succeeded by H. Robert Heller
Preceded by Frederick H. Schultz	Vice Chair of the Federal Reserve; 1982–1986	Succeeded by Manuel H. Johnson
