= Ronald Ransom =

American lawyer and bussesman (1882–1947)

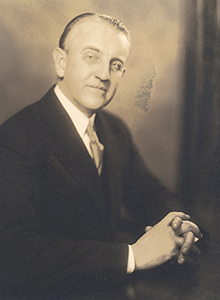

6th Vice Chairman of the Federal Reserve
- In office August 6, 1936 – December 2, 1947
- President: Franklin D. Roosevelt; Harry S. Truman
- Preceded by: John Thomas
- Succeeded by: C. Canby Balderston

Member of the Federal Reserve Board of Governors
- In office February 3, 1936 – December 2, 1947
- President: Franklin D. Roosevelt; Harry S. Truman
- Preceded by: George James
- Succeeded by: Thomas B. McCabe

Personal details
- Born: January 21, 1882; Columbia, South Carolina, U.S.
- Died: December 2, 1947 (aged 65)
- Political party: Democratic
- Education: University of Georgia (LLB)

Ronald Ransom (January 21, 1882 – December 2, 1947) was an American lawyer and businessman who served as the 6th vice chairman of the Federal Reserve from 1936 until his death in 1947.

Government offices
Preceded by George James	Member of the Federal Reserve Board of Governors; 1936–1947	Succeeded by Thomas B. McCabe
Preceded by John Thomas	Vice Chair of the Federal Reserve; 1936–1947	Succeeded by C. Canby Balderston
