= Alan Blinder =

American economist (born 1945)

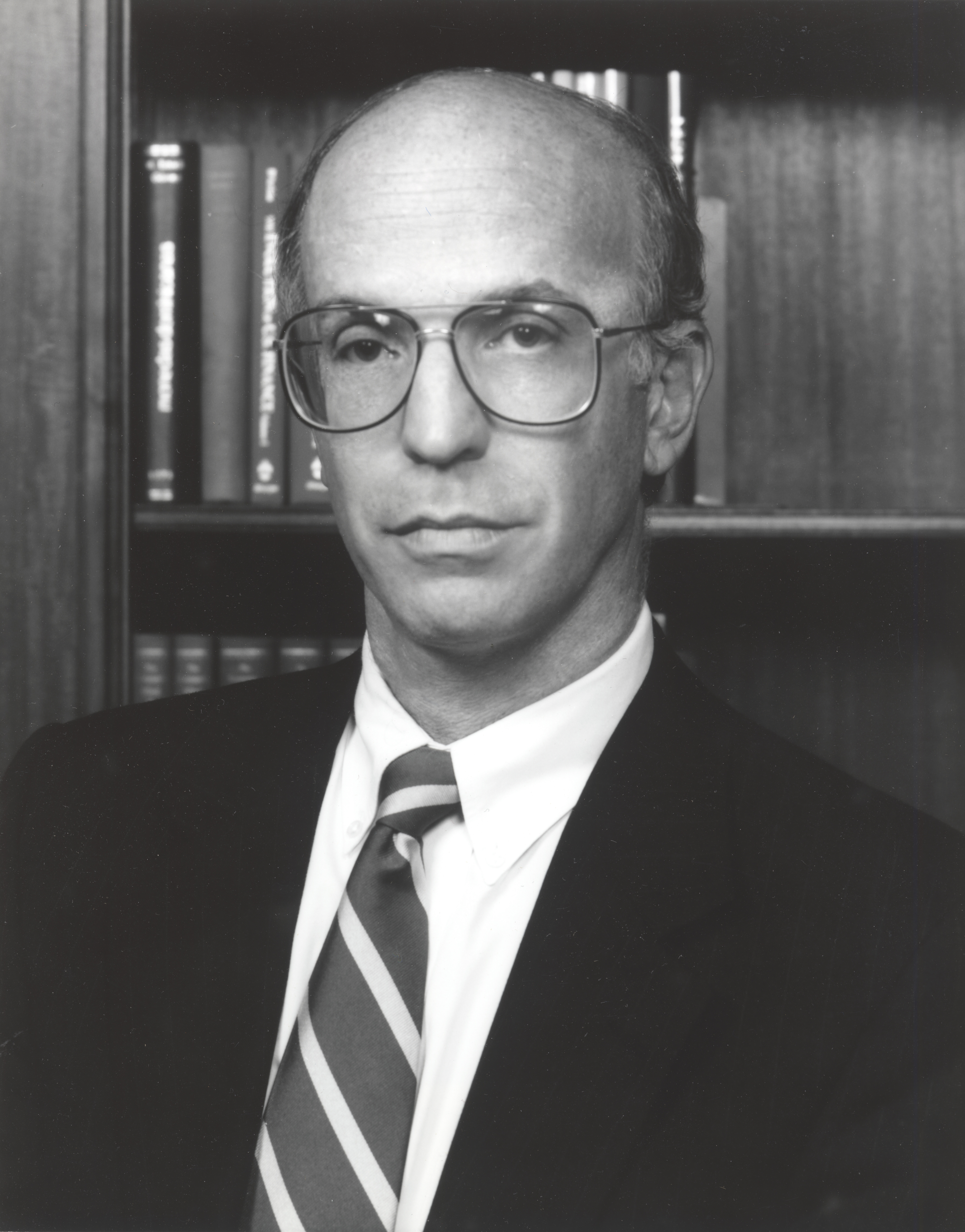

15th Vice Chairman of the Federal Reserve
- In office June 27, 1994 – January 31, 1996
- President: Bill Clinton
- Preceded by: David W. Mullins Jr.
- Succeeded by: Alice Rivlin

Member of the Federal Reserve Board of Governors
- In office June 27, 1994 – January 31, 1996
- President: Bill Clinton
- Preceded by: David W. Mullins Jr.
- Succeeded by: Alice Rivlin

Personal details
- Born: October 14, 1945 (age 81) New York City, U.S.
- Education: Princeton University (BA); London School of Economics (MSc); Massachusetts Institute of Technology (PhD)

Academic background
- Doctoral advisor: Robert Solow

Academic work
- Discipline: Macroeconomics
- School or tradition: New Keynesian economics
- Doctoral students: Julio Rotemberg
- Website: Information at IDEAS / RePEc

Alan Stuart Blinder (/ˈblaɪndər/, born October 14, 1945) is an American economics professor at Princeton University and is listed among the most influential economists in the world. He is a leading macroeconomist, politically liberal, and a champion of Keynesian economics and policies.

Blinder served on President Bill Clinton's Council of Economic Advisers from January 1993 to June 1994 and as the vice chairman of the Federal Reserve from June 1994 to January 1996.

His academic work has focused particularly on monetary policy and central banking, and on the "offshoring" of jobs. His writing has been published in The New York Times, The Washington Post, as well as a monthly column in The Wall Street Journal.

Regarding the 2008 financial crisis, Blinder drew ten lessons for fellow economists, including "Excessive complexity is not just anti-competitive, it's dangerous" and "Illiquidity closely resembles insolvency."

== Early life ==
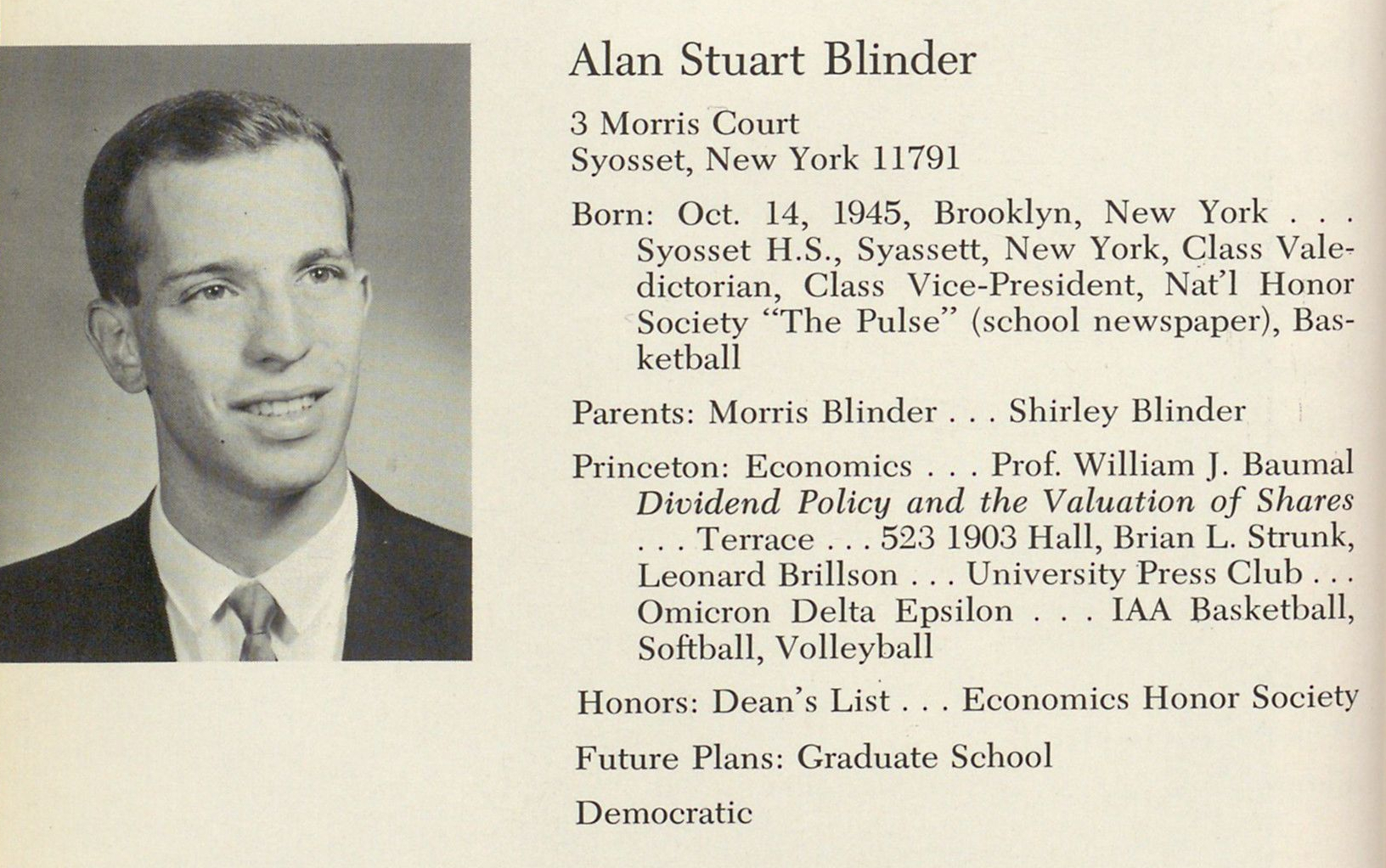
Blinder in the Princeton University yearbook, 1967

Blinder was born to a Jewish family in Brooklyn, New York. He graduated from Syosset High School in Syosset, New York. Blinder attended Princeton University as an undergraduate student and graduated summa cum laude with a B.A. in economics in 1967. He completed a 130-page long senior thesis, titled "The Theory of Corporate Choice". He received a M.Sc. in economics from the London School of Economics in 1968 and received a doctorate in economics from the Massachusetts Institute of Technology in 1971. He was advised by Robert Solow.

== Professional life ==
=== Academic career ===
Blinder is the Gordon S. Rentschler Memorial Professor of Economics and Public Affairs at Princeton where he has been since 1971; from 1988 to 1990, he chaired the economics department. Also in 1990, he founded Princeton's Griswold Center for Economic Policy Studies. And he has served as vice-chair of The Observatory Group.

Since 1978, Blinder has been a Research Associate of the National Bureau of Economic Research. He is a past president of the Eastern Economic Association and Vice President of the American Economic Association and was named a Distinguished Fellow of the latter in 2011. He is a Fellow of the American Academy of Arts and Sciences (since 1991), a member of the American Philosophical Society since 1996, and a member of the board of the Council on Foreign Relations (since 2008). Blinder's textbook Economics: Principles and Policy, co-written with William Baumol, was first published in 1979 and, in 2012, was printed in its twelfth edition.

In 2009, Blinder was inducted into the American Academy of Political and Social Science, "for his distinguished scholarship on fiscal policy, monetary policy and the distribution of income, and for consistently bringing that knowledge to bear on the public arena." He is a strong proponent of free trade. Blinder has been critical of the public discussion of the US national debt, describing it as generally ranging from "ludicrous to horrific".

In 2023, Blinder was awarded the Daniel Patrick Moynihan Prize for his contributions to advancing understanding in American economics.

=== Political career ===
Blinder is listed among the most influential economists in the world according to IDEAS/RePEc.

In 1975, Blinder served as the Deputy Assistant Director of the Congressional Budget Office.

In the 1990s, he served on President Bill Clinton's Council of Economic Advisers from January 1993 to June 1994, and as the 15th Vice Chair of the Federal Reserve from June 27, 1994, to January 31, 1996 (more specifically as the Vice Chairman of Board of Governors of the Federal Reserve System).

As Vice Chairman, Blinder cautioned against raising interest rates too quickly to slow inflation because of the lags in earlier rises feeding through into the economy. He also warned against ignoring the short term costs in terms of unemployment that inflation-fighting could cause.

Many have argued that Blinder's stint at the Fed was cut short because of his tendency to challenge chairman Alan Greenspan. By challenging assumptions, Blinder supposedly disrupted "the whole pipeline of Greenspan-arriving-at-decisions."

He was an adviser to Al Gore and John Kerry during their respective presidential campaigns in 2000 and 2004.

=== Private sector ===
Blinder was vice chairman of the Promontory Interfinancial Network, LLC.

After his service as the vice chairman of the Federal Reserve, Blinder, along with several former regulators, founded a company that offers a number of services that provide a means for depositors (including governmental entities, nonprofits, businesses, as well as individuals such as retirees) to access millions in Federal Deposit Insurance Corporation (FDIC) coverage at a single institution instead of multiple ones. This provides banks that are members the ability to offer coverage above the FDIC per account/per bank limit by letting those banks place funds into CDs or deposit accounts issued by other network banks. This occurs in increments below the standard FDIC insurance maximum ($250,000) so that both principal and interest are eligible for FDIC insurance. The company acts as a sort of clearinghouse, matching deposits from one institution with another. Through its services it allows access to higher levels of FDIC insurance although limits apply.

=== "Cash for Clunkers" ===
Blinder was an early advocate of a "Cash for Clunkers" program, in which the government buys some of the oldest, most-polluting vehicles and scraps them. In July 2008, he wrote an article in The New York Times advocating such a program, which was implemented by the Obama administration during the summer of 2009. Blinder asserted it could stimulate the economy, benefit the environment, and reduce income inequality. The program was praised by President Obama for "exceeding expectations", but criticized for economic and environmental reasons.

=== Great Recession of 2008 and 2009, and slow recovery ===
The Great Recession started in December 2007 and bottomed-out in June 2009, at which point the U.S. economy began a slow recovery. Blinder points out that payroll employment didn't regain its previous level until almost five additional years.

Blinder argues for 10 lessons for fellow economists, including the following —

6) "Excessive complexity is not just anti-competitive, it's dangerous."

7) "Go-for-broke incentives will induce traders to go for broke."

8) "Illiquidity closely resembles insolvency."

" . . Lehman was in worse shape than Bear. But, especially given the consequences of a Lehman bankruptcy, was it really that much worse? . . "

Regarding the teaching of college-level economics, Blinder writes, "If you are not teaching your students that 'Keynesianism' is neither conservative nor liberal, you should be."

Economic models with one interest rate ("the" interest rate) are no longer enough. He writes, "After all, in the 2000s we saw several dramatic instances of risk spreads first narrowing dangerously, then skyrocketing once fear took over from greed, and then narrowing again as calm returned."

For a beginning class in economics, he recommends including QE, or Quantitative Easing, as practiced by the Fed. He also favors including that investment bubbles can and do occur, and that "leverage is a double-edged sword."

Regarding other concepts such as "Too Big To Fail," Blinder recommends including them in advanced courses but not in introductory classes. He thinks the early class(es) should include material which economists largely agree on, the "received wisdom" as it were, although he sees how other teachers might come to different conclusions.

=== Most people care more about their jobs than cheap consumer goods? ===
In a 2019 article entitled "The Free-Trade Paradox: The Bad Politics of a Good Idea," Blinder states that the main focus of the economics profession has been using price signals to produce goods and services as cheaply as possible. Jobs are viewed as secondary, and often as a distinct negative which people put up with only to get the money needed for their own consumption.

But then he asks, "What if people care as much (or more) about their role as producers — about their jobs — as they do about the goods and services they consume? That would mean economists have been barking up the wrong tree for more than two centuries."

He still thinks there's an excellent case to be made for free trade, just not the case which economists typically make.

== Selected works ==
- (2022), A Monetary and Fiscal History of the United States, 1961–2021, Princeton University Press.
- (2014), "What Did We Learn from the Financial Crisis, the Great Recession, and the Pathetic Recovery?" Princeton University Griswold Center for Economic Policy Studies Working Paper No. 243, 22-page paper, November 2014.
- (2013), After the Music Stopped: The Financial Crisis, the Response, and the Work Ahead, New York: Penguin Press, 24 Jan. 2013. ISBN 978-1-59420-530-9
- (2009), "How Many U.S. Jobs Might Be Offshorable," World Economics, April–June 2009, 10(2): 41–78.
- (2009), "Making Monetary Policy by Committee," International Finance, Summer 2009, 12(2): 171–194.
- (2008), "Do Monetary Policy Committees Need Leaders? A Report on an Experiment," American Economic Review (Papers and Proceedings), May 2008, pp. 224–229.
- (2006), "Offshoring: The Next Industrial Revolution?" Foreign Affairs", March/April 2006, pp. 113–128. (A longer version with footnotes and references is "Fear of Offshoring," CEPS Working Paper No. 119, December 2005).
- (2006), "The Case Against the Case Against Discretionary Fiscal Policy," in R. Kopcke, G. Tootell, and R. Triest (eds.), The Macroeconomics of Fiscal Policy, MIT Press, 2006, forthcoming, pp. 25–61.
- (2004), The Quiet Revolution, Yale University Press
- (2001, with William Baumol and Edward N. Wolff), Downsizing in America: Reality, Causes, And Consequences, Russell Sage Foundation
- (2001, with Janet Yellen), The Fabulous Decade: Macroeconomic Lessons from the 1990s, New York: The Century Foundation Press
- (1998, with E. Canetti, D. Lebow, and J. Rudd), Asking About Prices: A New Approach to Understanding Price Stickiness, Russell Sage Foundation
- (1998), Central Banking in Theory and Practice, MIT Press
- (1991), Growing Together: An Alternative Economic Strategy for the 1990s, Whittle
- (1990, ed.), Paying for Productivity, Brookings
- (1989), Macroeconomics Under Debate, Harvester-Wheatsheaf
- (1989), Inventory Theory and Consumer Behavior, Harvester-Wheatsheaf
- (1987), Hard Heads, Soft Hearts: Tough‑Minded Economics for a Just Society, Addison-Wesley
- (1983), Economic Opinion, Private Pensions and Public Pensions: Theory and Fact. The University of Michigan
- (1979, with William Baumol), Economics: Principles and Policy – textbook
- (1979), Economic Policy and the Great Stagflation. New York: Academic Press
- (co-edited with Philip Friedman, 1977), Natural Resources, Uncertainty and General Equilibrium Systems: Essays in Memory of Rafael Lusky, New York: Academic Press
- (1974), Toward an Economic Theory of Income Distribution, MIT Press

== See also ==
- Antifragile#The Alan Blinder problem

Government offices
Preceded by David W. Mullins Jr.	Member of the Federal Reserve Board of Governors; 1994–1996	Succeeded by Alice Rivlin
Preceded by David W. Mullins Jr.	Vice Chair of the Federal Reserve; 1994–1996	Succeeded by Alice Rivlin
