= Frederick H. Schultz =

American bussesman and politician (1929–2009)

Fred Schultz
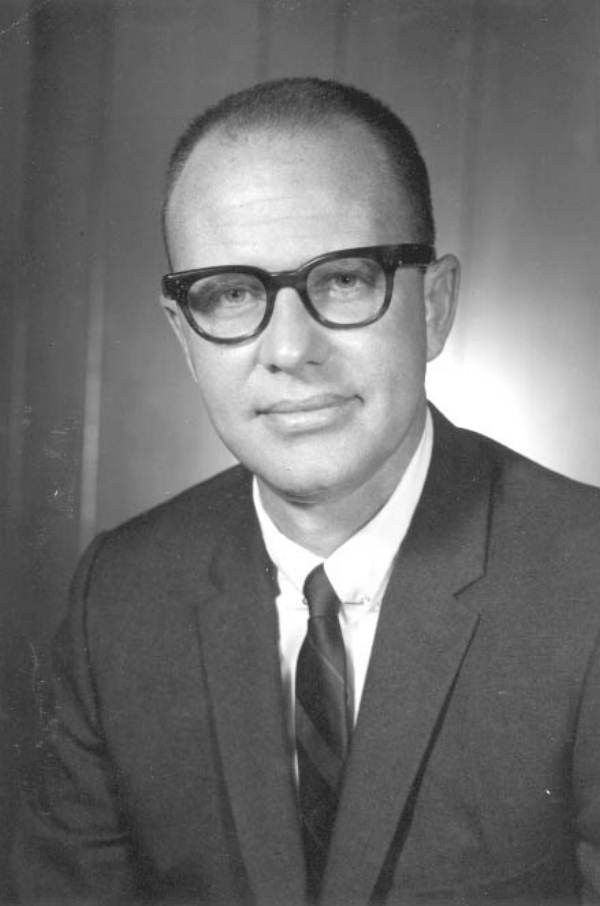

11th Vice Chairman of the Federal Reserve
- In office July 27, 1979 – February 11, 1982
- President: Jimmy Carter; Ronald Reagan
- Preceded by: Stephen Gardner
- Succeeded by: Preston Martin

Member of the Federal Reserve Board of Governors
- In office July 27, 1979 – February 11, 1982
- President: Jimmy Carter; Ronald Reagan
- Preceded by: Philip Jackson
- Succeeded by: Preston Martin

Speaker of the Florida House of Representatives
- In office 1968–1970
- Preceded by: Ralph Turlington
- Succeeded by: Dick Pettigrew

Personal details
- Born: Frederick Henry Schultz; January 16, 1929 Jacksonville, Florida, U.S.
- Died: November 23, 2009 (aged 80) Jacksonville, Florida, U.S.
- Party: Democratic
- Spouse: Nancy
- Children: 4
- Education: Princeton University (BA); University of Florida (LLB)

Frederick Henry Schultz (January 16, 1929 – November 23, 2009) was an American businessman and politician who served as the 11th vice chairman of the Federal Reserve from 1979 to 1982. He served as the speaker of the Florida House of Representatives from 1968 to 1970.

== Early life and education ==
Schultz graduated with an A.B. in history from Princeton University in 1951 after completing a senior thesis titled "A History of the Greyhound Corporation." Schultz served as an artillery officer in the United States Army during the Korean War from 1952 to 1954, and was awarded the Bronze Star. Schultz later attended the University of Florida College of Law, graduated with his law degree in 1956.

== Career ==
Schultz was elected in Jacksonville and served in the Florida House of Representatives from 1963 to 1970; his last two years as Speaker. President Jimmy Carter appointed him to the Board of Governors in 1979 and he was Vice Chair of the Federal Reserve until 1982. In addition, he also served as Chairman of the Florida Institute of Education from 1983 to 1987.

On November 23, 2009, Schultz died of prostate cancer at his Jacksonville home at age 80.

Government offices
Preceded by Philip Jackson	Member of the Federal Reserve Board of Governors; 1979–1982	Succeeded by Preston Martin
Preceded by Stephen Gardner	Vice Chair of the Federal Reserve; 1979–1982	Succeeded by Preston Martin
