= Lawrence Clayton =

American banker and corporate executive (1891–1949)

Larry Clayton
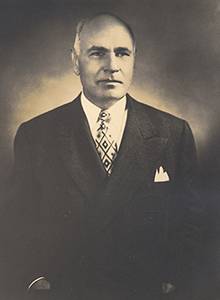

Member of the Federal Reserve Board of Governors
- In office February 14, 1947 – December 4, 1949
- President: Harry S. Truman
- Preceded by: Ralph Morrison
- Succeeded by: Oliver S. Powell

Personal details
- Born: March 1, 1891; Salt Lake City, Utah, U.S.
- Died: December 4, 1949 (aged 58); Montgomery County, Maryland, U.S.
- Education: Stanford University (BA); Harvard University (LLB)

Lawrence Clayton (March 1, 1891 – December 4, 1949) was an American banker and corporate executive who served as a member of the Federal Reserve Board of Governors from 1947 until his death in 1949. Clayton was a longtime assistant and ally to Chairman Marriner S. Eccles.

Son of Nephi Willard Clayton and Sybella White, and grandson of William Clayton and Augusta Braddock Clayton. Had three children: Sybella White Clayton G'Schwend (March 12, 1922 – June 3, 2013), "Larry" Lawrence Clayton Jr (1924–1988), and Barbara Ruth Clayton Gookin (June 9, 1926 – December 15, 2013), all likely born in Ogden, Utah. Lawrence Jr was born in Washington D.C.

Clayton received an A.B. from Stanford University in 1914 and an LL.B. from Harvard Law School in 1916. He served in the Field Artillery of the US Army in France during World War 1. President Harry S. Truman appointed Clayton as a governor of the Federal Reserve System, effective February 14, 1947. Clayton died of a heart attack at home at the age of 58 while in office.

Clayton is buried at Arlington National Cemetery Section 8 Grave 539 with his wife Ruth Myrtle Dunn Clayton (September 26, 1896 – October 12, 1954).

Government offices
Preceded by Ralph Morrison	Member of the Federal Reserve Board of Governors; 1947–1949	Succeeded by Oliver S. Powell
