= Kathryn M. Dominguez =

Professor of Public Policy and Economics

Kathryn Dominguez
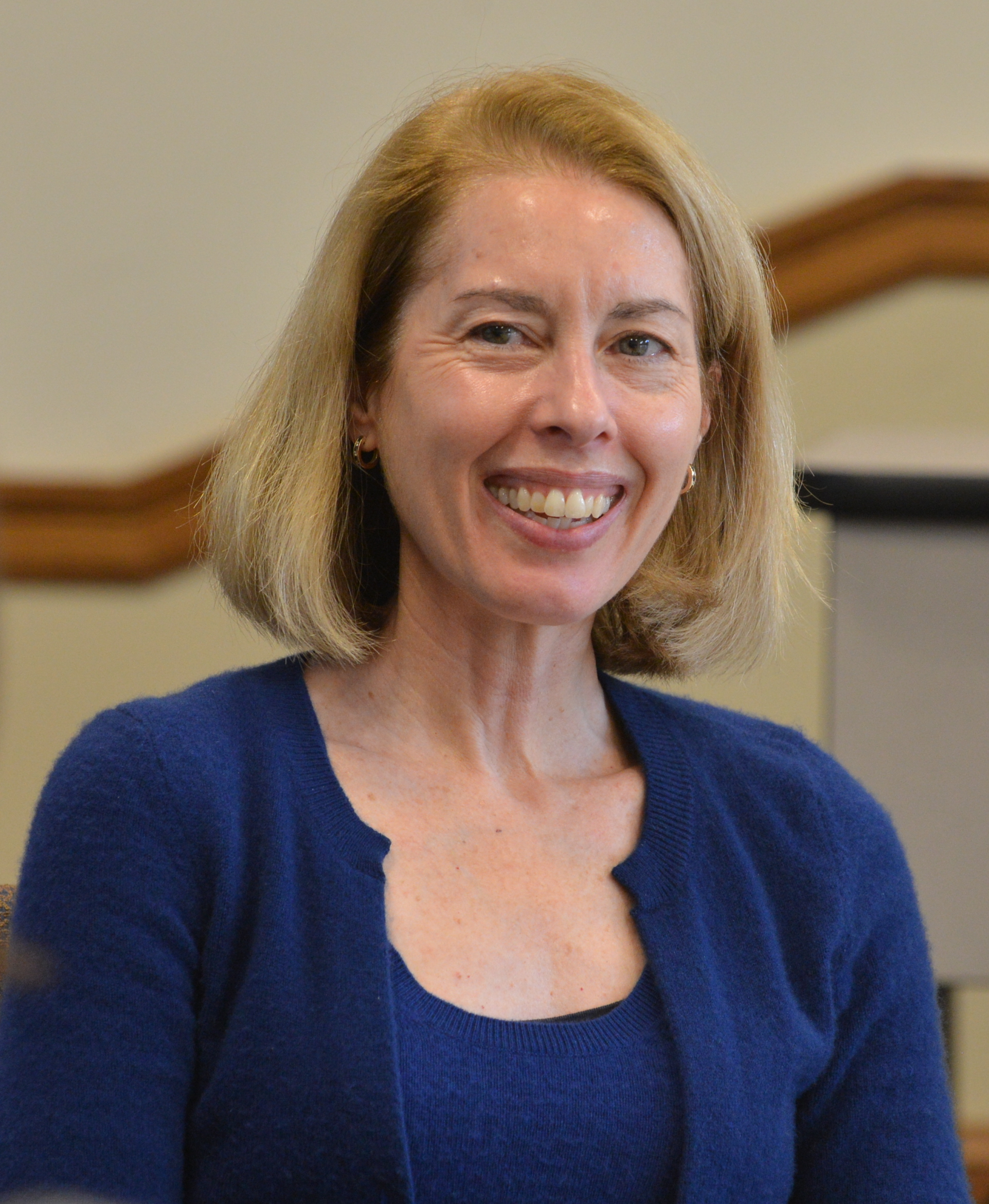

Personal details
- Born: November 26, 1960 (age 64); Los Angeles, California, U.S.
- Education: Vassar College (AB); Yale University (MA, PhD)
- Website: Official website

Kathryn Mary Elizabeth Dominguez (born November 26, 1960) is a Professor of Public Policy and Economics at the University of Michigan and is a former nominee for the Governor of the U.S. Federal Reserve System.

== Early life and education ==
Dominguez was born on November 26, 1960, in Los Angeles, California. She received her Artium Baccalaureus degree in 1982 from Vassar College. She received a Doctor of Philosophy in Economics in 1987 from Yale University. Prior to attaining her Ph.D., she served on the research staff of the Fiscal Analysis Division of the Congressional Budget Office during the summer of 1984 and as a dissertation scholar in the International Finance Division of the Board of Governors of the Federal Reserve, from 1985 to 1986.

== Career ==
=== Academic ===
In July 1987, Dominguez was appointed an Assistant Professor of Public Policy at the John F. Kennedy School of Government at Harvard University. In July 1991, she gained academic tenure when she was appointed as an associate professor of Public Policy at the same institution. From 1990 to 1991, she also served as a visiting assistant professor at Princeton University, in their Department of Economics. She served with the Harvard faculty until 1997, when she joined the faculty at the Gerald R. Ford School of Public Policy at the University of Michigan as an associate professor of Public Policy. In 2004, she was appointed Professor of Public Policy and in 2006 she was appointed Professor of Public Policy and Economics, in which capacity she continues to serve. From 2003 to 2004, she was an academic visitor at the London School of Economics and Political Science. From 2008 to 2009, she served as a visiting professor of Public Policy at the Goldman School of Public Policy at the University of California, Berkeley.

=== Other service ===
Dominguez served as an Olin Fellow at the National Bureau of Economic Research in Cambridge, Massachusetts, from 1991 to 1992, and has served as a research associate since 2000. She has served as a research consultant for the World Bank, the International Monetary Fund and the Bank for International Settlements. She served as a visiting scholar at the Federal Reserve Board of Governors in December 2002. She served on the Academic Advisory Panels for the Federal Reserve Bank of Cleveland in 2007 and the Federal Reserve Bank of Chicago in 2013.

=== Nomination to Federal Reserve Board of Governors ===
On July 21, 2015, President Obama nominated Dominguez to be a member of the Federal Reserve Board of Governors, to the seat vacated by Jeremy C. Stein who resigned on May 28, 2014. Her nomination was returned to the President under the provisions of Senate Rule XXXI, paragraph 6 of the Standing Rules of the Senate.

== Personal ==
Dominguez is a dual citizen of the United States and Ireland. She is married with two children, Julia and Elizabeth Hines.
