= William W. Sherrill =

American economist and government official (1926–2019)

Member of the Federal Reserve Board of Governors
- In office May 1, 1967 – November 15, 1971
- President: Lyndon B. Johnson; Richard Nixon
- Preceded by: Charles N. Shepardson
- Succeeded by: John E. Sheehan

Personal details
- Born: William W. Sherrill; August 23, 1926 Houston, Texas
- Died: September 19, 2019 (aged 93)
- Education: University of Houston (BA); Harvard Business School (MBA)

William W. Sherrill (August 23, 1926 – September 19, 2019) was an American economist who served as a member of the Federal Reserve Board of Governors from 1967 to 1971.

Government offices
Preceded by Charles N. Shepardson	Member of the Federal Reserve Board of Governors; 1967–1971	Succeeded by John E. Sheehan
