= Manuel H. Johnson =

American economist and financial advisor (born 1949)

Manley Johnson
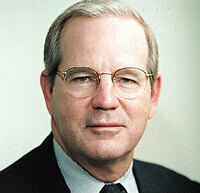

13th Vice Chairman of the Federal Reserve
- In office August 4, 1986 – August 3, 1990
- President: Ronald Reagan; George H. W. Bush
- Preceded by: Preston Martin
- Succeeded by: David W. Mullins Jr.

Member of the Federal Reserve Board of Governors
- In office February 7, 1986 – August 3, 1990
- President: Ronald Reagan; George H. W. Bush
- Preceded by: Charles Partee
- Succeeded by: Lawrence B. Lindsey

Personal details
- Born: Manuel Holman Johnson Jr. February 10, 1949 (age 76); Troy, Alabama, U.S.
- Political party: Republican
- Spouse: Mary Wilkerson
- Education: University of Alabama, Tuscaloosa; Troy University (BA); Florida State University (MS, PhD)

Manuel Holman "Manley" Johnson Jr. (born February 10, 1949) is an American economist who served as the 13th vice chairman of the Federal Reserve from 1986 to 1990. After leaving the Fed, he has been co-chairman and senior partner at Johnson Smick International, Inc., an investments, economic and political consulting firm. He has also authored or co-authored six books.

== Early life and education ==
Johnson was born on February 10, 1949, in Troy, Alabama, a small town in rural southeast Alabama. Although formally named Manuel, he often informally goes by "Manley" He attended the University of Alabama from 1967 to 1968. In 1968, he volunteered for the U.S. Army and served with both ranger and special forces units until 1971. He returned from service and completed his undergraduate studies at Troy State University, now Troy University, graduating in 1973 with a Bachelor of Science (B.S.) degree in economics cum laude. He furthered his education at Florida State University at Tallahassee, graduating in 1974 with a Master of Science (M.S.) degree in economics. In 1977, he earned a Ph.D. in economics from Florida State University.

== Career ==
From 1977 to 1994, Johnson was a professor of economics at George Mason University, where he held the Koch Chair in International Economics.

Johnson served as Deputy Assistant Secretary (1981–1982) and Assistant Secretary of the Treasury for Economic Policy (1982–1986). While at the Treasury, Johnson was responsible for the formulation of economic policy initiatives and development of the Administration's economic forecast for the budget. He was also instrumental in designing the Economic Recovery Tax Act of 1981 and the Tax Reform Act of 1986, which represents the most comprehensive change in the history of U.S. tax law. His performance at the Treasury won him the Alexander Hamilton Award, the department's highest honor.

Johnson was Vice Chair of the Federal Reserve for four and a half years beginning in February 1986. While at the Fed, Johnson presided over one of the most stable economic periods in the post-World War II era. His responsibility for international operations and financial crisis management involved him in some of the most dramatic events of the 1980s. Johnson played a key role in preventing systemic economic damage during the stock market crash of October 1987 and in the coordination of international monetary policy by the Group of Ten major industrial countries.

He became co-chairman and senior partner, along with David Smick, in the investment and consulting firm of Smick Medley International in September 1990. At that time, the name was changed to Johnson Smick International, Inc. (JSI). JSI invests with money management funds and provides information services on important economic and political policy changes in major countries that impact global financial institutions located throughout the world.

Johnson's academic research and writing have been concentrated in the area of political economy and public policy. He is the author and co-author of six books and has published over 50 articles in academic journals and other publications. In addition to his writings, Johnson has edited a professional journal, and served on three presidential and congressional commissions. He also is currently chairman of the Board of The National Sporting Library and Museum and serves on the board of directors of the Morgan Stanley Funds Group, and NVR Inc.

From 1997 to 2004 Johnson was president and Chairman of the Financial Accounting Foundation (the organization that supervises the preparation of U.S. accounting standards).

== Bibliography ==
- Manuel H. Johnson (November 2017) Ten Generations of Byrds in America Mascot Books. ISBN 978-1-68401-131-5
- Manuel H. Johnson, Robert E. Keleher (October 1996) Monetary Policy, A Market Price Approach. Greenwood Publishing Group. ISBN 978-1-56720-059-1
- Dan C. Heldman, James T. Bennett, Manuel H. Johnson (June 1981) Deregulating Labor Relations Fisher Institute. ISBN 978-0-933028-14-2
- James T. Bennett, Manuel H. Johnson, William E. Simon (February 1981) Better Government at Half the Price: Private Production of Public Services Jameson Books. ISBN 978-0-89803-048-8
- James T. Bennett, Manuel H. Johnson (August 1980) Political Economy of Federal Government Growth Private Enterprise Research Center (PERC). ISBN 978-0-86599-001-2

Government offices
| Preceded by Charles Partee | Member of the Federal Reserve Board of Governors; 1986–1990 | Succeeded by Lawrence B. Lindsey |
| Preceded by Preston Martin | Vice Chair of the Federal Reserve; 1986–1990 | Succeeded by David W. Mullins Jr. |
