= George W. Mitchell =

American economist and government official (1904–1997)

George Mitchell
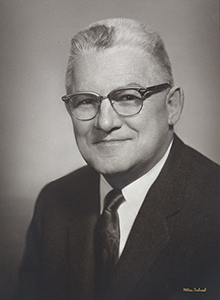

9th Vice Chairman of the Federal Reserve
- In office May 1, 1973 – February 13, 1976
- President: Richard Nixon; Gerald Ford
- Preceded by: James Robertson
- Succeeded by: Stephen Gardner

Member of the Federal Reserve Board of Governors
- In office August 31, 1961 – February 13, 1976
- President: John F. Kennedy; Lyndon B. Johnson; Richard Nixon; Gerald Ford
- Preceded by: Menc Szymczak
- Succeeded by: Stephen Gardner

Personal details
- Born: George Wilder Mitchell; February 23, 1904; Richland Center, Wisconsin, U.S.
- Died: January 25, 1997 (aged 92); Arlington, Virginia, U.S.
- Political party: Democratic
- Education: University of Wisconsin, Madison (BA)

George Wilder Mitchell (February 23, 1904 – January 25, 1997) was an American economist who served as the 9th vice chairman of the Federal Reserve from 1973 to 1976. Prior to his term as vice chairman, Mitchell served as a member of the Federal Reserve Board of Governors, taking office in 1961. He was a long-time staffer at the Federal Reserve Bank of Chicago before his appointment to the Board. Mitchell was an early promoter of electronic banking.

== Early life and education ==
Mitchell was born on February 23, 1904, to George Ray and Minnie Mitchell in rural Richland Center, WI. He graduated from the University of Wisconsin in 1925. After graduating, he worked as a research assistant at the University of Iowa and the University of Chicago until 1932.

== Career ==
In 1933, Mitchell was hired as the Director of Research for the Illinois Tax Commission. In 1940, he became Assistant to the Director of Revenue for the State of Illinois.

In 1943, Mitchell joined the staff of the Federal Reserve Bank of Chicago, but was also as a consultant for the Bureau of Internal Revenue. During this time, Mitchell simultaneously served as Director of Finance for the State of Illinois under Governor Adlai Stevenson. He was later appointed as the head of research for the Chicago Fed.

In 1961, President John F. Kennedy appointed Mitchell as a Governor for the Federal Reserve Board.

In 1973, President Richard Nixon appointed Mitchell as the Vice Chair of the Federal Reserve. He served under Fed Chairman Arthur F. Burns. Shortly thereafter, he was thrust into a difficult position of resisting a guarantee of the municipal bonds of New York City, echoing the stance favored by President Gerald Ford. Mitchell stated that a guarantee would be akin to a bailout and would subject the Fed to all manner of political pressures. Ultimately, the federal government helped New York City avoid bankruptcy with a loan and debt restructuring by the Municipal Assistance Corporation in 1975.

Mitchell was a member of the American Economic Association, American Finance Association, and National Committee on Government Finance, Brookings Institution.

Government offices
Preceded by Menc Szymczak	Member of the Federal Reserve Board of Governors; 1961–1976	Succeeded by Stephen Gardner
Preceded by James Robertson	Vice Chair of the Federal Reserve; 1973–1976	Succeeded by Stephen Gardner
