= Oliver S. Powell (banker) =

American economist, educator, and author (1896–1963)

Oliver Powell
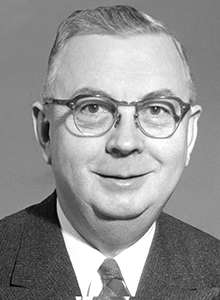

President of the Federal Reserve Bank of Minneapolis
- In office July 1, 1952 – March 31, 1957
- Preceded by: John Peyton
- Succeeded by: Frederick Deming

Member of the Federal Reserve Board of Governors
- In office September 1, 1950 – June 30, 1952
- President: Harry S. Truman; Dwight D. Eisenhower
- Preceded by: Lawrence Clayton
- Succeeded by: C. Canby Balderston

Personal details
- Born: September 17, 1896 White Rock, South Dakota, U.S.
- Died: July 26, 1963 (aged 66) Edina, Minnesota, U.S.
- Resting place: Lakewood Cemetery
- Party: Democratic
- Spouse: Ada
- Children: 3
- Education: University of Minnesota, Twin Cities (BA)

Oliver S. Powell (September 17, 1896 – July 26, 1963) was an American economist, educator and author who was a member of the Federal Reserve Board of Governors from 1949 to 1952. After leaving the Federal Reserve Board, Powell was elected as president and CEO of the Federal Reserve Bank of Minneapolis from 1952 to 1957.

He was born in White Rock, South Dakota. Powell married Ada. He had a daughter and two sons, Mrs. W. R. Jerome, Richard O. and Robert B. He lived on Casco Avenue in Edina, Minnesota. He died on July 25, 1963. He was buried in Lakewood Cemetery.

Government offices
| Preceded by Lawrence Clayton | Member of the Federal Reserve Board of Governors; 1950–1952 | Succeeded by C. Canby Balderston |
Other offices
| Preceded by John Peyton | President of the Federal Reserve Bank of Minneapolis; 1952–1957 | Succeeded by Frederick Deming |
