= Michelle Bowman =

American attorney (born 1971)

Miki Bowman
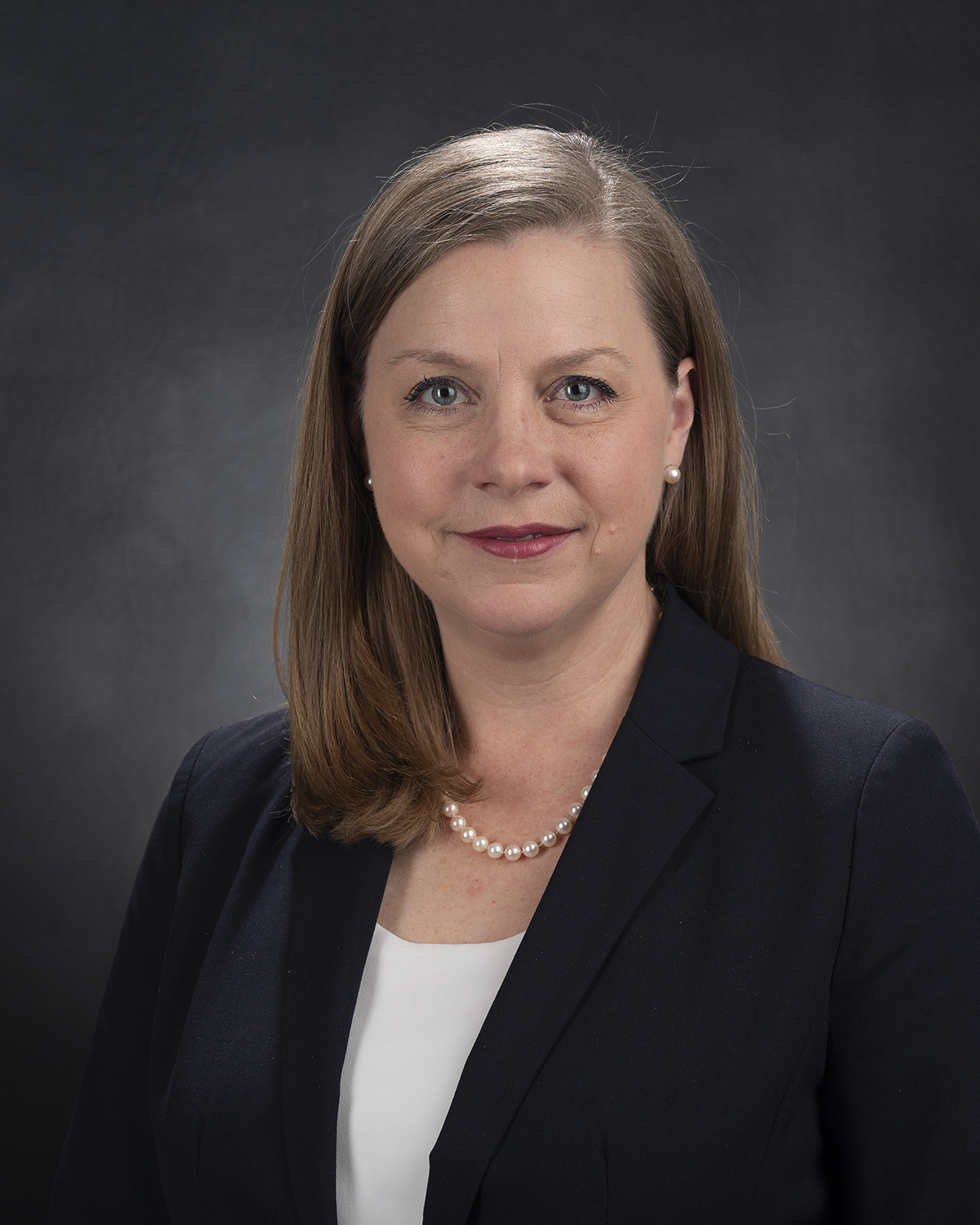
- Official portrait, 2018

Vice Chair of the Federal Reserve for Supervision
- Incumbent
- Assumed office June 9, 2025
- President: Donald Trump
- Preceded by: Michael Barr

Member of the Federal Reserve Board of Governors
- Incumbent
- Assumed office November 26, 2018
- President: Donald Trump; Joe Biden; Donald Trump
- Preceded by: Stanley Fischer

Personal details
- Born: Michelle White Bowman; May 25, 1971 (age 55) Honolulu, Hawaii, U.S.
- Party: Republican
- Education: University of Kansas (BS); Washburn University (JD)

Michelle White "Miki" Bowman (born May 25, 1971) is an American attorney who has served as a member of the Federal Reserve Board of Governors since 2018. She is the first person to fill the community bank seat on the board, a seat created by a 2015 law.

Previously, Bowman was the Kansas banking commissioner, from January 2017 through November 2018. She also held senior staff positions at the Federal Emergency Management Agency and Department of Homeland Security during the George W. Bush administration.

After seven years as a Federal Reserve board member, President Trump nominated Bowman to succeed Michael Barr as Vice Chair for Supervision of the board, a position she was confirmed for in early June 2025. In that position, she launched a substantial deregulatory push of the U.S. banking sector.

== Early life and education ==
Bowman was born in 1971 in Hawaii to John Hale White and Martha Jayne. Her paternal grandparents were Carlene (née Gufler) and Clarence Hale White (1908–1993), a longtime bank executive at the Farmers & Drovers Bank in Council Grove, Kansas and he was the third generation in a prominent Kansas dynasty of bankers founded by William Henry White.

When she was young, her family moved frequently because of her father’s career in the U.S. Air Force. She lived much of her youth in Illinois, near St. Louis, and graduated from high school in Council Grove, Kansas. Her family owns the Farmers & Drovers Bank, one of the oldest banks in Kansas.

Bowman graduated from the University of Kansas in Lawrence with a Bachelor of Science degree in Advertising and Journalism. She then earned a Juris Doctor from Washburn University School of Law in Topeka, graduating in 1996.

== Career ==
=== U.S. government ===
Bowman worked as an intern for Senator Bob Dole from 1995 to 1996. Between 1997 and 2002, she served as a counsel to the U.S. House Committee on Transportation and Infrastructure and then as counsel to the Committee on Government Reform and Oversight.

In 2002, Bowman was appointed by President George W. Bush as Director of Congressional and Intergovernmental Affairs at the Federal Emergency Management Agency (FEMA). In 2003, when the Department of Homeland Security was established, she became a Deputy Assistant Secretary and Policy Advisor to Secretary Tom Ridge.

=== Public relations and consulting ===
In 2004, Bowman's husband’s job took the couple to London. There, she started her own public affairs and consulting business, the Bowman Group. She remained active in politics as chair of Republicans Abroad UK.

=== Banking ===
Bowman returned to the U.S. in 2010, joining the Farmers & Drovers Bank, her family's bank, as vice president, where she served as a director, compliance officer, and trust officer. The bank had assets of $181 million in 2017.

=== Kansas banking commissioner ===
Bowman left Farmers & Drovers to become the Kansas banking commissioner on January 31, 2017, after being nominated by Kansas Governor Sam Brownback in late 2016. She served in the position until November 2018.

=== Federal Reserve ===
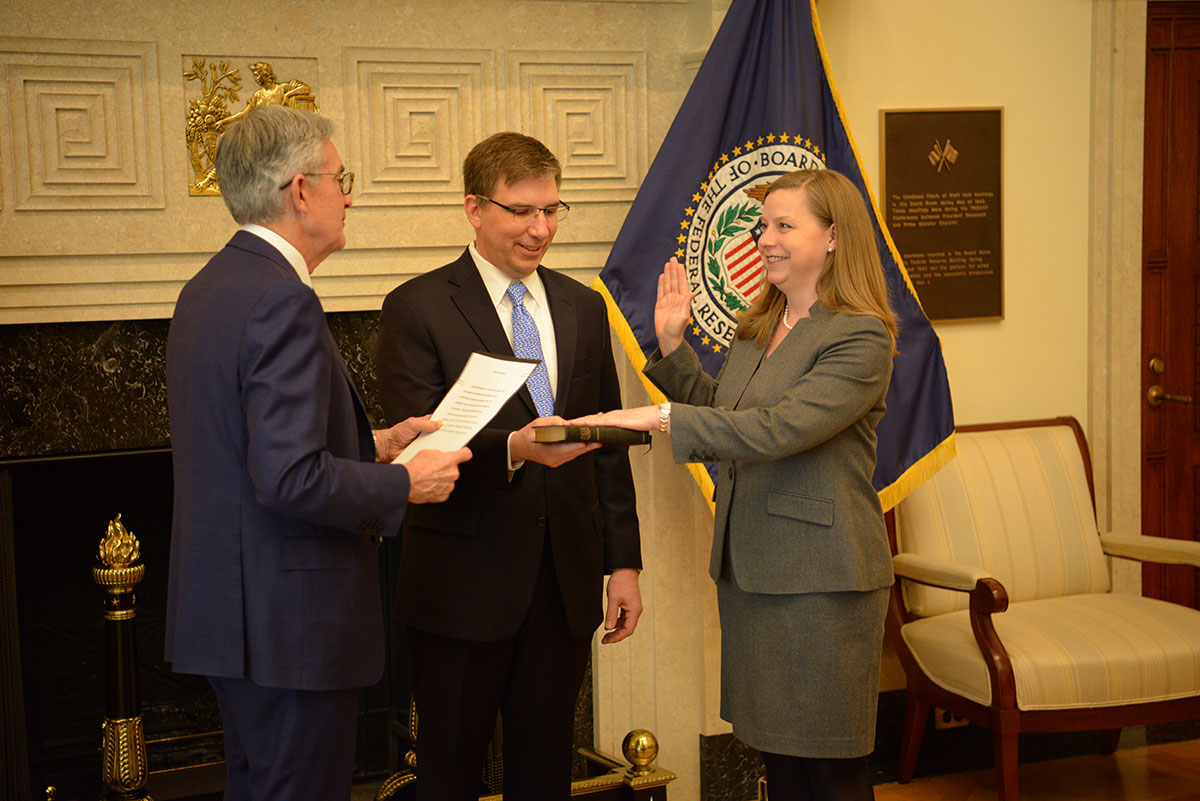
Michelle Bowman, accompanied by her husband Wes Bowman, is sworn in by Jerome Powell for her second term, expiring in 2034, as a member of the Board of Governors of the Federal Reserve System

In April 2018, Donald Trump nominated Bowman to fill the 14-year term on the U.S. Federal Reserve Board of Governors of Stanley Fischer, which was to expire on January 31, 2020, and to occupy the board seat that represents community banks. In November 2018, Bowman was confirmed by the U.S. Senate by a vote of 64 to 34. On April 2, 2019, the White House announced that Trump planned to nominate Bowman to a full 14-year term on the Federal Reserve Board when her current term expired in January 2020. Bowman was reappointed to the Board on January 23, 2020 and sworn in on January 30, 2020 for a term ending January 31, 2034.

On June 4, 2025, Bowman was confirmed as vice chair for supervision by the Senate with a 48–46 vote. On June 6, she spoke at Georgetown University about her goals in the new job. On June 9, Bowman assumed her new position with a four-year term finishing in 2029, sworn in by The Federal Reserve board chair Powell.

In October 2025, United States Secretary of the Treasury Scott Bessent confirmed that Bowman was one of five candidates being considered by President Trump to replace Chair of the Federal Reserve Jerome Powell when his term ends in May 2026.

==== Vice Chair of the Federal Reserve for Supervision ====
Shortly after taking the position of Vice Chair of the Federal Reserve for Supervision, Bowman launched a deregulatory effort of the U.S. banking sector. According to the Financial Times, it was "one of the most significant reversals of US financial regulation for decades." In November 2025, The Wall Street Journal reported that Bowman had announced in an internal memo to Federal Reserve staff that the staff in the Fed’s supervision and regulation division would be cut by 30%. The Wall Street Journal reported, "The memo offers new insight into plans by Bowman, who was nominated by Trump to serve as vice chair earlier this year, to drastically rein in the Fed’s oversight of the banking sector." According to the New York Times, Bowman's actions since taking office as Vice Chair of the Federal Reserve for Supervision had been to provide "regulatory relief to banks." Bowman had previously argued that banks faced too much red tape and should be subject to less stringent oversight.

== Personal life ==
Bowman is married to Wes Bowman. The couple’s two children were born during the five years that they lived in England, between 2004 and 2010.

Government offices
| Preceded by Stanley Fischer | Member of the Federal Reserve Board of Governors; 2018–present | Incumbent |
| Preceded by Michael Barr | Vice Chair of the Federal Reserve for Supervision; 2025–present | Incumbent |
