= John Sheehan (central banker) =

American economist and government official (1929–2014)

John E. Sheehan

Member of the Federal Reserve Board of Governors
- In office January 4, 1972 – June 1, 1975
- President: Richard Nixon; Gerald Ford
- Preceded by: William W. Sherrill
- Succeeded by: Philip C. Jackson Jr.

Personal details
- Born: John E. Sheehan; December 11, 1929 Johnstown, Pennsylvania, U.S.
- Died: October 14, 2014 (aged 84) Willow Street, Pennsylvania, U.S.
- Political party: Republican
- Education: United States Naval Academy (BA); Harvard Business School (MBA)

John E. Sheehan (December 11, 1929 – October 30, 2014) was an American economist who served as a member of the Federal Reserve Board of Governors from 1972 to 1975.

Government offices
Preceded by William W. Sherrill	Member of the Federal Reserve Board of Governors; 1972–1975	Succeeded by Philip C. Jackson Jr.
