= David W. Mullins Jr. =

American economist and government official (1946–2018)

David Mullins
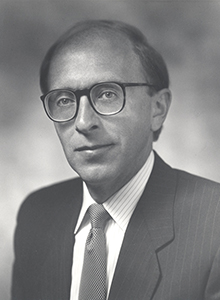

14th Vice Chairman of the Federal Reserve
- In office July 24, 1991 – February 14, 1994
- President: George H. W. Bush; Bill Clinton
- Preceded by: Manuel H. Johnson
- Succeeded by: Alan Blinder

Member of the Federal Reserve Board of Governors
- In office May 21, 1990 – February 14, 1994
- President: George H. W. Bush; Bill Clinton
- Preceded by: H. Robert Heller
- Succeeded by: Alan Blinder

Personal details
- Born: David Wiley Mullins Jr. April 28, 1946 Memphis, Tennessee, U.S.
- Died: February 26, 2018 (aged 71) Naples, Florida, U.S.
- Party: Democratic (Formerly); Republican
- Education: Yale University (BS); Massachusetts Institute of Technology (MS, PhD)

David Wiley Mullins Jr. (April 28, 1946 – February 26, 2018) was an American economist who served as the 14th vice chairman of the Federal Reserve from 1991 to 1994. Prior to his term as vice chairman, Mullins served as a member of the Federal Reserve Board of Governors, taking office in 1990. Before his appointment to the Federal Reserve, he served as the under secretary of the treasury for domestic finance under President George H. W. Bush. Mullins left the government service to join the hedge fund Long Term Capital Management and remained in private finance following its collapse in 1998.

== Early life ==
David Mullins was born on April 28, 1946, to David Wiley Mullins and his wife Eula in Memphis, Tennessee. His father worked for Auburn University until 1960, when he became the president of the University of Arkansas. David Jr. was raised in Fayetteville, Arkansas, along with his brother Gary and sister Carolyn. Mullins left Arkansas for Yale and went on to study finance at the MIT Sloan School of Management. In 1974 he earned his Ph.D. from MIT and accepted a position in the faculty of Harvard Business School as an expert in financial crises.

== Career ==
Immediately after the market crash in 1987, President Reagan tapped Nicholas F. Brady, a former United States senator and then chairman of Dillon, Read & Co., to chair the Presidential Task Force on Market Mechanisms, later known as the Brady Commission. Brady recruited Harvard Business School professor Robert R. Glauber as the commission's executive director, and Glauber in turn enlisted Mullins, a Harvard faculty colleague, as associate director. <Report of the Presidential Task Force on Market Mechanisms, p. ii> The commission was to be an inquiry into the stock market crash of October 19, 1987, known as Black Monday. In two months, Mullins helped assemble nearly 50 people to produce the report, which provided the first official record of what caused the crash and offered recommendations on how to fix the deficiencies in the market. The Brady Report laid some of the blame on derivatives trading and portfolio insurance mechanisms, with much of that focus being generated by Mullins.

Brady went on to serve as Secretary of the Treasury. As the savings and loan crisis deepened, he turned to Mullins, now an assistant Secretary of the Treasury, to develop a plan to resolve the crisis. The plan was enacted by Congress on August 8, 1989, as FIRREA (The Financial Institutions Reform Recovery and Enforcement Act of 1989) which created the RTC to dispose of failed thrift assets. The RTC ultimately sold $394 billion in assets of 747 failed thrifts. This approach became a model for banking resolution plans in Sweden, Thailand and elsewhere. Mullins remained popular with Congress and the President. In 1989, Mullins was appointed by President Bush as assistant Secretary of the Treasury for domestic finance. While at the Treasury, Mullins co-wrote a paper on high-yield debt defaults which received the inaugural Smith Breeden Prize.

On May 21, 1990, Bush nominated Mullins to a 14-year term on the Federal Reserve Board of Governors to fill a vacancy left by the resignation of H. Robert Heller. Mullins was seen as the Fed's "resident intellectual" due to his background as a professor in finance and economics. In 1994, Mullins resigned to join John Meriwether's new hedge fund, Long Term Capital Management (LTCM). Although his term was to come to a close, the resignation was viewed as unexpected.

At LTCM, Mullins joined what Business Week termed a "dream team" of financial experts and academics, including Nobel laureates Myron Scholes and Robert C. Merton. Roger Lowenstein, author of When Genius Failed: The Rise and Fall of Long-Term Capital Management, argued that some prospective investors in LTCM were swayed by the presence of Mullins. Just as the celebrity of Scholes and Merton caused investors and trading partners to exercise less diligence, Mullins' addition as a "marquee" name added gravitas to the firm. Following that fund's collapse in 1998 and dissolution in 2000, Mullins left LTCM and worked for financial services companies. Mullins' career in government was effectively ended by the collapse. In 2008 he was chief economist of the hedge fund Vega Asset Management.

== Death ==
Mullins Jr. died unexpectedly during an emergency heart surgery in Naples, Florida, on February 26, 2018.

== Notes ==
Government offices
Preceded by H. Robert Heller	Member of the Federal Reserve Board of Governors; 1990–1994	Succeeded by Alan Blinder
Preceded by Manuel H. Johnson	Vice Chair of the Federal Reserve; 1991–1994	Succeeded by Alan Blinder
