= James Robertson (central banker) =

American economist and government official (1932–2016)

James L. Robertson

Vice Chair of the Federal Reserve Board of Governors
- In office March 1, 1966 – April 30, 1973
- President: Lyndon B. Johnson; Richard Nixon
- Preceded by: C. Canby Balderston
- Succeeded by: George W. Mitchell

Member of the Federal Reserve Board of Governors
- In office February 18, 1952 – March 1, 1966
- President: Harry Truman; Dwight Eisenhower; John F. Kennedy; Lyndon B. Johnson
- Preceded by: Edward L. Norton
- Succeeded by: Robert C. Holland

Personal details
- Born: James L. Robertson; October 31, 1907 Broken Bow, Nebraska, U.S.
- Died: February 23, 1994 (aged 86) Bethesda, Maryland, U.S.
- Education: George Washington University (BA, LLB); Harvard Law School (LLM)

James L. Robertson (October 31, 1907 – February 23, 1994) was an American economist who served as a member of the Federal Reserve Board of Governors from 1952 to 1973. From 1966 to 1973, he was vice chairman of the board.

== Early life and career ==
Robertson was born in Broken Bow, Nebraska in 1907. He attended Grinnell College in Iowa and George Washington University in Washington, D.C. for his undergraduate degrees of a bachelor of arts and a bachelor of law degree. In 1927, he worked at the U.S. Senate Post Office and had served as Chief Clerk from 1928 to 1931. (Note: Some sources in this article state that in 1927, he had worked as an aide to Senator George W. Norris of Nebraska. However, his biography for the Senate hearing on his nomination to the Federal Reserve Board of Governors does not mention this.)

In 1931, he was admitted to the Bar of the Court of Appeals for the District of Columbia. In 1932, he worked as a special agent of the Federal Bureau of Investigation. In that same year, he had completed his masters of law degree from Harvard Law School. The following year, he left his position at the FBI to work in 1933 as part of the legal staff of the Office of the Comptroller of the Currency (OCC) as assistant counsel to the Comptroller of the Currency. In 1935, he was admitted to the Bar of the United States Supreme Court. In 1942, be was promoted to assistant chief counsel at the OCC. During the Second World War, he temporarily took leave from the OCC and served as a lieutenant in the U.S. Naval Reserve from 1943 to 1944. After serving in the U.S. Navy, he became the First Deputy Comptroller of the Currency at the OCC from 1944 until President Harry S. Truman appointed him as a member of the Board of Governors of the Federal Reserve in 1952. President Lyndon Johnson appointed for a second term in 1964. In 1966, he became vice chairman of the board of governors.

== Career ==
During his tenure at the Federal Reserve, he had encourage the creating of a federal banking commission that would manage the responsibility of bank examinations and supervision as functions consolidated under one agency. Presently, the responsibility for this task is managed by:

- The Office of Comptroller of the Currency (OCC)
- The Federal Reserve
- The Federal Deposit Insurance Corporation (FDIC)

Robertson had a history of casting the dissenting vote in board meetings. One example is when the 1965 sale of Grace National Bank to Marine Midland Bank was approved by the Federal Reserve Board of Governors in a vote of 6-1, Robertson was the dissenting vote and had stated:

I cannot accept the view that simply because Grace has in effect been labeled a limited service bank and Marine Midland a full service bank, there is no significant competition.

Concerning the Truth in Lending Act, he had stated in before the 1969 Senate Banking and Currency Committee Subcommittee on Financial Institutions the following:

The functions vested in the Board by the Truth in Lending Act should not be taken as a precedent for assigning to the Board wide-ranging duties in the general area of consumer protection. Such an assignment would be inconsistent with effective performance of our primary duties in the field of monetary policy. In view of the increasing interest Congress is showing in expanding Federal legislation for the protection of consumers, we strongly recommend that responsibility for implementing such legislation be vested not in the Board but in an agency more familiar with consumer problems and more expert in coping with them.

Upon retiring from the Federal Reserve, he became an attorney at the law firm of Bierbauer and Rockefeller.
