= Janet Yellen =

American economist and government official (born 1946)

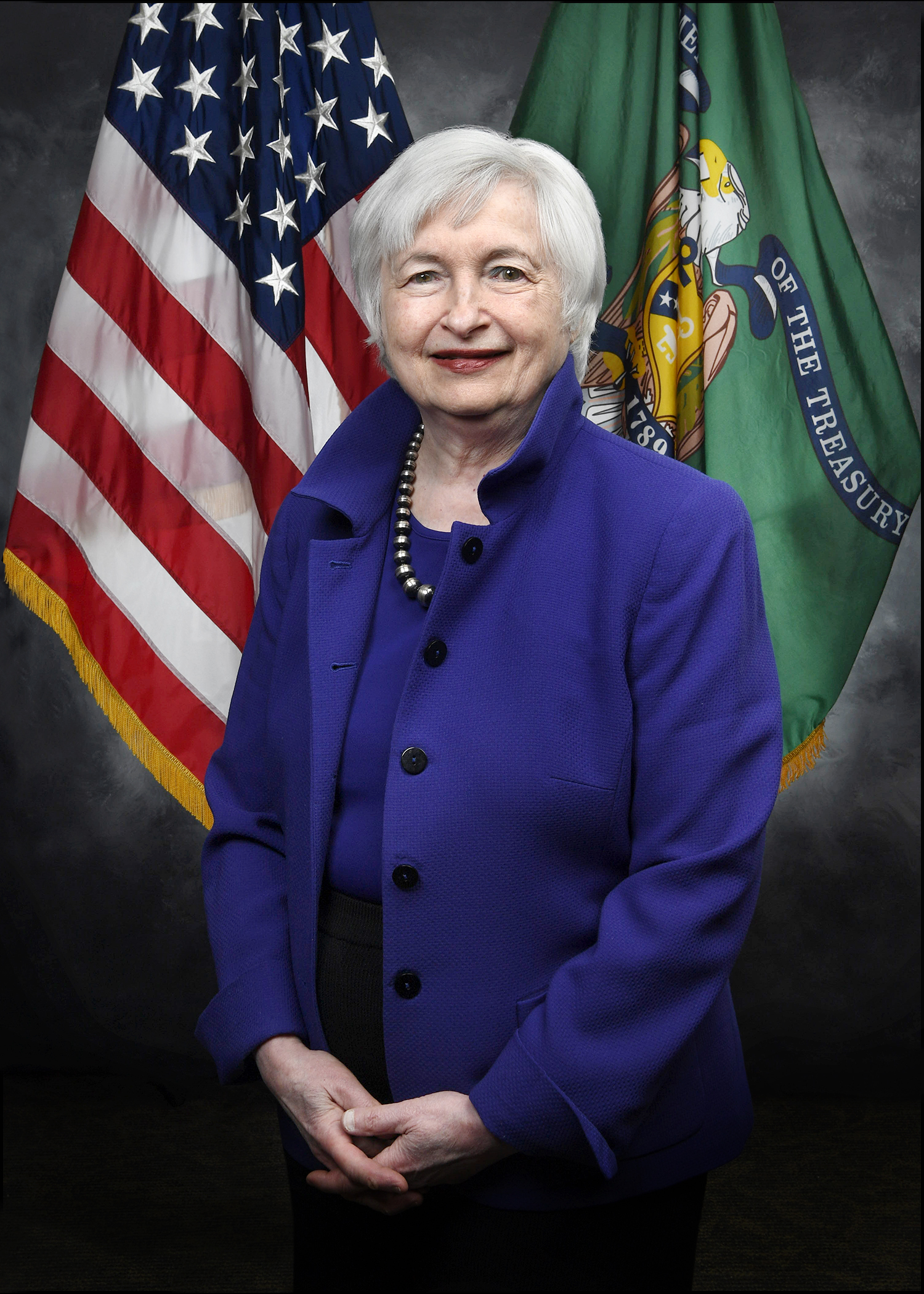
- Official portrait, 2021

78th United States Secretary of the Treasury
- In office January 26, 2021 – January 20, 2025
- President: Joe Biden
- Deputy: Wally Adeyemo
- Preceded by: Steven Mnuchin
- Succeeded by: Scott Bessent

15th Chair of the Federal Reserve
- In office February 3, 2014 – February 3, 2018
- President: Barack Obama; Donald Trump
- Deputy: Stanley Fischer
- Preceded by: Ben Bernanke
- Succeeded by: Jerome Powell

19th Vice Chair of the Federal Reserve
- In office October 4, 2010 – February 3, 2014
- President: Barack Obama
- Preceded by: Donald Kohn
- Succeeded by: Stanley Fischer

Member of the Federal Reserve Board of Governors
- In office October 4, 2010 – February 3, 2018
- President: Barack Obama; Donald Trump
- Preceded by: Mark W. Olson
- Succeeded by: Lisa Cook
- In office August 12, 1994 – February 17, 1997
- President: Bill Clinton
- Preceded by: Wayne Angell
- Succeeded by: Edward Gramlich

11th President of the Federal Reserve Bank of San Francisco
- In office June 14, 2004 – October 4, 2010
- Preceded by: Robert Parry
- Succeeded by: John Williams

18th Chair of the Council of Economic Advisers
- In office February 18, 1997 – August 3, 1999
- President: Bill Clinton
- Preceded by: Joseph Stiglitz
- Succeeded by: Martin Neil Baily

Personal details
- Born: Janet Louise Yellen; August 13, 1946 (age 80) New York City, New York, U.S.
- Party: Democratic
- Spouse: George Akerlof (m. 1978)
- Children: 1
- Education: Brown University (BA); Yale University (MA, PhD)
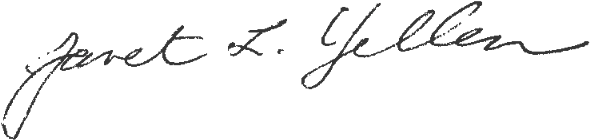
- Signature
- Scientific career
- Fields: Macroeconomics; Labor economics New Keynesian economics
- Workplaces: Harvard University; London School of Economics; University of California, Berkeley; National Bureau of Economic Research; Brookings Institution
- Thesis: Employment, Output and Capital Accumulation in an Open Economy: A Disequilibrium Approach (1971)
- Doctoral advisor: James Tobin
- Other academic advisors: Joseph Stiglitz
- Doctoral students: Charles Engel
- Website: Information at IDEAS / RePEc
- Yellen's voice Yellen on the importance of raising the debt ceiling. Recorded March 23, 2023

Janet Louise Yellen (born August 13, 1946) is an American economist who served as the 78th United States secretary of the treasury from 2021 to 2025 and as the 15th chair of the Federal Reserve from 2014 to 2018. She was the first woman to hold either position, and has also led the White House Council of Economic Advisers. Yellen is professor emeritus at the University of California, Berkeley, where she joined the faculty in 1980 and held the Eugene E. and Catherine M. Trefethen professorship in business administration and economics.

Born and raised in Bay Ridge, Brooklyn, Yellen graduated from Brown University in 1967 and earned a Ph.D. in economics from Yale University in 1971. She taught as an assistant professor at Harvard University from 1971 to 1976, was a staff economist for the Federal Reserve Board from 1977 to 1978, and was a faculty member at the London School of Economics from 1978 to 1980. Yellen is professor emeritus at the Haas School of Business at the University of California, Berkeley, where she has been a faculty member since 1980 and became the Eugene E. and Catherine M. Trefethen Professor of Business Administration and Professor of Economics.

Yellen served as a member of the Federal Reserve Board of Governors from 1994 to 1997 and was nominated to the position by President Bill Clinton, who then named her chair of the Council of Economic Advisers from 1997 to 1999. She subsequently returned to academia, before serving as president and chief executive officer of the Federal Reserve Bank of San Francisco from 2004 until 2010. Afterward, President Barack Obama chose her to replace Donald Kohn as the vice chair of the Federal Reserve from 2010 to 2014 before nominating her to succeed Ben Bernanke as chair of the Federal Reserve three years later. She was succeeded by Jerome Powell after President Donald Trump declined to renominate her for a second term. Following her departure from the Federal Reserve, Yellen joined the Brookings Institution as a distinguished fellow in residence from 2018 until 2020, when she again went into public service.

On November 30, 2020, President-elect Joe Biden nominated Yellen to serve as secretary of the treasury; she was confirmed by the U.S. Senate on January 25, 2021, and was sworn in by Vice President Kamala Harris the following day.

== Early life and education ==
Yellen was born on August 13, 1946, to a family of Polish Jewish ancestry in the Bay Ridge, Brooklyn, neighborhood of New York City, and grew up there. Her mother was Anna Ruth (née Blumenthal; 1907–1986), an elementary school teacher who gave up her teaching job to become a stay-at-home mother. Her father was Julius Yellen (1906–1975), a family physician who worked from the ground floor of their house. Janet has an older brother, John (born 1942), who is a program director for archaeology at the National Science Foundation.

In a speech at the POLIN Museum of the History of Polish Jews, Yellen said that her father's family immigrated to the United States from Sokołów Podlaski, a small town about 50 miles outside of Warsaw. She said further that nearly the entirety of its Jewish population, including many of her relatives, were deported or murdered during the Holocaust.

Yellen attended the local Fort Hamilton High School, where she was an honor society member and participated in the booster club, the psychology club, and the history club. She also served as editor-in-chief of The Pilot, the school newspaper, which continued its 13-year streak as the first-place winner of the prestigious Columbia Scholastic Press Association contest under her leadership. She earned a National Merit commendation letter and was admitted to a selective science honors program at Columbia University to voluntarily study mathematics on Saturday mornings. Yellen was one of 30 students to win state Regents scholarships for college and one of a select few to win the mayor's citation for a scholarship. She graduated in 1963 as the valedictorian of her class.

Yellen enrolled at Pembroke College in Brown University, initially intending to study philosophy. During her freshman year, she switched her planned major to economics and was particularly influenced by professors George Herbert Borts and Herschel Grossman. In the spring of 1964, she also joined the business staff of The Brown Daily Herald, but soon afterward she left the paper to focus on her academic studies. Yellen graduated summa cum laude and Phi Beta Kappa with a bachelor's in economics from Brown University in 1967, and earned her master's and PhD in economics from Yale University in 1971. Her dissertation was titled Employment, Output and Capital Accumulation in an Open Economy: A Disequilibrium Approach under the supervision of James Tobin, a noted economist who would later receive the Nobel Memorial Prize. As a teaching assistant, Yellen was so meticulous in her note-taking during Tobin's macroeconomics class that her notes became the unofficial textbook and were referred to as "Yellen Notes" while being circulated among generations of graduate students. Her former professor and Nobel Prize in Economics laureate, Joseph Stiglitz, has called her one of his brightest and most memorable students. She later described Yale professors Tobin and William Brainard as "lifelong mentors" who laid the intellectual groundwork for her economic views. Yellen was the only woman among the two dozen economists who earned their doctorates from Yale in 1971.

== Academic career ==
After receiving her Ph.D., Yellen obtained the position of assistant professor of economics at Harvard University, where she taught from 1971 to 1976. At that time, she was one of only two female faculty members in Harvard's economics department; the other woman was Rachel McCulloch. The pair struck up a close friendship and went on to write several academic papers together. In 1977, Yellen took a job within the Federal Reserve's Board of Governors after failing to win tenure at Harvard; she was recruited as a staff economist for the Board of Governors by Edwin M. Truman, who had known her from Yale. Truman was a junior professor when he heard Yellen's oral exam and was then about to take over the Fed's Division of International Finance. She was assigned to research international monetary reform.

While at the Fed, she met her husband, economist George Akerlof, in the bank's cafeteria; they married in 1978, less than a year later. By the time of their marriage, Akerlof had already accepted a teaching position at the London School of Economics (LSE). Yellen left her post at the Fed to accompany him and was given a tenure-track lectureship by LSE. The couple stayed in the United Kingdom for two years before returning to the United States, in part due to identity issues because they felt American, not English.

In 1980, Yellen joined the faculty of the University of California, Berkeley, where she taught at the Haas School of Business to conduct macroeconomics research and teach undergraduate and MBA students for more than two decades. She earned the Haas School's outstanding teaching award twice, in 1985 and 1988. Yellen became just the second woman at Berkeley-Haas to earn tenure in 1982, as well as the title of full professor in 1985. She was named the Bernard T. Rocca Jr. Professor of International Business and Trade in 1992.

From 1994 to 1999, Yellen took a leave of absence from Berkeley to go into public service. After returning to academia, she resumed her teaching assignment at Haas and received a joint appointment with Berkeley's Department of Economics. She was appointed the Eugene E. and Catherine M. Trefethen Professor of Business Administration and Professor of Economics in 1999 and remained an active faculty member until she was appointed president and chief executive officer of the Federal Reserve Bank of San Francisco in 2004. Yellen was awarded the title of professor emeritus at UC Berkeley in 2006.

Throughout her career, Yellen served as an adviser to the Congressional Budget Office (CBO), the Brookings Panel on Economic Activity, and the National Science Foundation's Panel in Economics. She was also a research associate at the National Bureau of Economic Research from 1999 to 2010. In 2025, she joined the board of advisors for Angeleno Group, a private equity and venture capital firm focused on sustainable energy investments.

=== Contributions to economics ===
Yellen's academic career has largely focused on the analysis of the mechanisms of unemployment and labor markets, monetary and fiscal policies, and international trade. She has written a few widely cited papers, often collaborating on research with her husband, Professor George Akerlof.

==== Efficiency wage models ====
Since the 1980s, Yellen and Akerlof have addressed what is known in the economics literature as "efficiency wage theory" – the idea that paying people more than the market wage does increase their productivity. Their 1990 paper, entitled "The Fair-Wage Effort Hypothesis and Unemployment", coined "the fair wage effort hypothesis" and was considered by economists to be a significant contribution to the topic: "A precursor to the efficiency wage literature...it had an influence, although the work on efficiency wage theory has had a bigger influence." Akerlof and Yellen introduced the gift-exchange game, which argues that workers who are paid less than what they consider to be a fair wage will purposefully work less hard to exact revenge on their employer.

==== Reproductive technology shock ====
Another work, "An Analysis of Out-of-Wedlock Childbearing in the United States", co-written with Akerlof and Michael Katz and published in 1996, aims to explain why out-of-wedlock births have grown considerably in previous decades in the United States. A research study led to a theory called "reproductive technology shock", arguing that the increased availability of both abortion and contraception in the late 1960s and early 1970s, amidst the sexual revolution, eroded the social norms surrounding sex, pregnancy, and marriage, leading to a sharp decline in the stigma of unwed motherhood. At the same time, this transformation encouraged biological fathers to reject notions of marital and paternal obligations.

== Federal Reserve (1994–1997) ==
On April 22, 1994, President Bill Clinton announced his intention to nominate Yellen as a member of the Federal Reserve Board of Governors, alongside Alan Blinder, who has been designated as vice chairman. They were the first Democratic appointees to the Board since 1980. In an issued statement, the president praised her as "one of the most prominent economists of her generation on the intersection of macroeconomics and labor markets." President Clinton played an indirect role in the selection process, delegating most of the responsibility to NEC Director Robert Rubin, Treasury Secretary Lloyd Bentsen, and CEA Chair Laura Tyson, who was a colleague of Yellen's at Berkeley. The group settled on her candidacy after an exhaustive search that at one point included nearly 50 names. In July 1994, during her confirmation hearing before the Senate Banking Committee, Yellen said that Fed policies should keep the economy growing as much as possible without accelerating inflation but avoid taking a clear position on the prospect of further increases in interest rates. The Senate panel approved her nomination without much Republican opposition, by a vote of 18 to 1; the only dissenting vote came from Senator Lauch Faircloth (R-NC), who said that her concerns should be limited to inflation. The nomination was confirmed in the full United States Senate by a vote of 94–6. On August 12, 1994, Yellen was appointed to a full 14-year term and assumed the seat vacated by Republican Wayne Angell. She was installed as the fourth female governor, joining Susan M. Phillips, which marks the first time that two women have sat on the Federal Reserve Board simultaneously.

In July 1996, the Federal Reserve resisted pressure to raise interest rates as unemployment dropped. Yellen marshaled academic research to dissuade Chairman Alan Greenspan from committing the Fed to a zero inflation policy and demonstrate that the central bank should seek to moderate inflation rather than eliminate it. According to the study, a low inflation rate of around 2 percent provided a better foundation for reducing unemployment and increasing economic growth than the goal of zero.

Upon her confirmation as chair of the Council of Economic Advisers, she resigned as a member of the Board of Governors of the Federal Reserve System on February 17, 1997.

== Council of Economic Advisers (1997–1999) ==
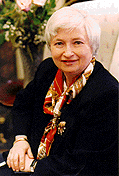
Official photo as CEA chair, c. 1990s

On December 20, 1996, Yellen joined the Clinton administration as chair of President Clinton's Council of Economic Advisers (CEA), replacing Joseph Stiglitz in office. She was reluctant to leave the Federal Reserve, but White House officials talked her into a job, passing over others with greater marquee value because, as Treasury Secretary Robert Rubin said, "We wanted someone who could bring a rigorous analytic approach to the issues and who could work well with others." Yellen was unanimously confirmed by the Senate on February 13, 1997, thereby becoming the second woman to serve as chief economic advisor to the president after Laura Tyson. While serving within the Administration, she concurrently chaired the OECD Economic Policy Committee from 1997 to 1999.

During her time with the Council of Economic Advisers, Yellen oversaw a June 1998 report, "Explaining Trends in the Gender Wage Gap", which focused on the gender pay divide. Within this study, the Council analyzed data from 1969 to 1996 to determine the reasons why women earn substantially less than men. By observing trends attributable to issues such as occupation and industry, as well as familial status, it was determined that while the Equal Pay Act of 1963 was a step forward, there was no explanation for a 25-percent difference between average pay for women and men – an improvement from the 40-percent gap two decades earlier. It was concluded that this gap had no correlation with differences in productivity and, as such, was the result of discrimination within the workforce.

In June 1999, Yellen announced that she was stepping down from the CEA for personal reasons and would return to teaching at UC Berkeley. It was reported that President Clinton asked her to take over from Alice Rivlin, the central bank's vice chairwoman – an offer she turned down.

== Return to the Federal Reserve (2004–2018) ==
=== Federal Reserve Bank of San Francisco ===
On April 12, 2004, the Federal Reserve announced that Yellen would replace Robert T. Parry as president and chief executive officer of the Federal Reserve Bank of San Francisco, taking office on June 14. She was the first woman to hold this position. While serving as Federal Reserve District president, she sat on the policy-setting Federal Open Market Committee (FOMC) and was a voting member once every three years on a rotating basis, with her first being in 2006. During her time at the San Francisco Fed, the largest of the 12 Federal Reserve Banks in terms of population and economic output, Yellen publicly downplayed concerns about the potential consequences of the boom in housing prices; at FOMC meetings, on the contrary, she sounded the alarm on banks' heavy concentration in risky construction and home-development loans. On the other hand, she did not lead the San Francisco Fed to "move to check [the] increasingly indiscriminate lending" of Countrywide Financial, the United States' largest lender.

On June 5, 2009, Yellen said that the Federal Reserve should consider raising interest rates earlier to prevent another housing bubble. She argued that higher short-term interest rates probably went against the expansion of a bubble in certain circumstances, like restraining the demand for housing and high-risk mortgages.

In July 2009, Yellen was mentioned as a potential successor to Chairman Ben Bernanke when his term was set to expire before he was re-nominated for a second four-year term. She eventually emerged as the leading contender for vice chair of the Federal Reserve Board in March 2010, and following her Senate confirmation, she resigned from the San Francisco Fed in October of that year.

=== Vice Chair of the Federal Reserve ===
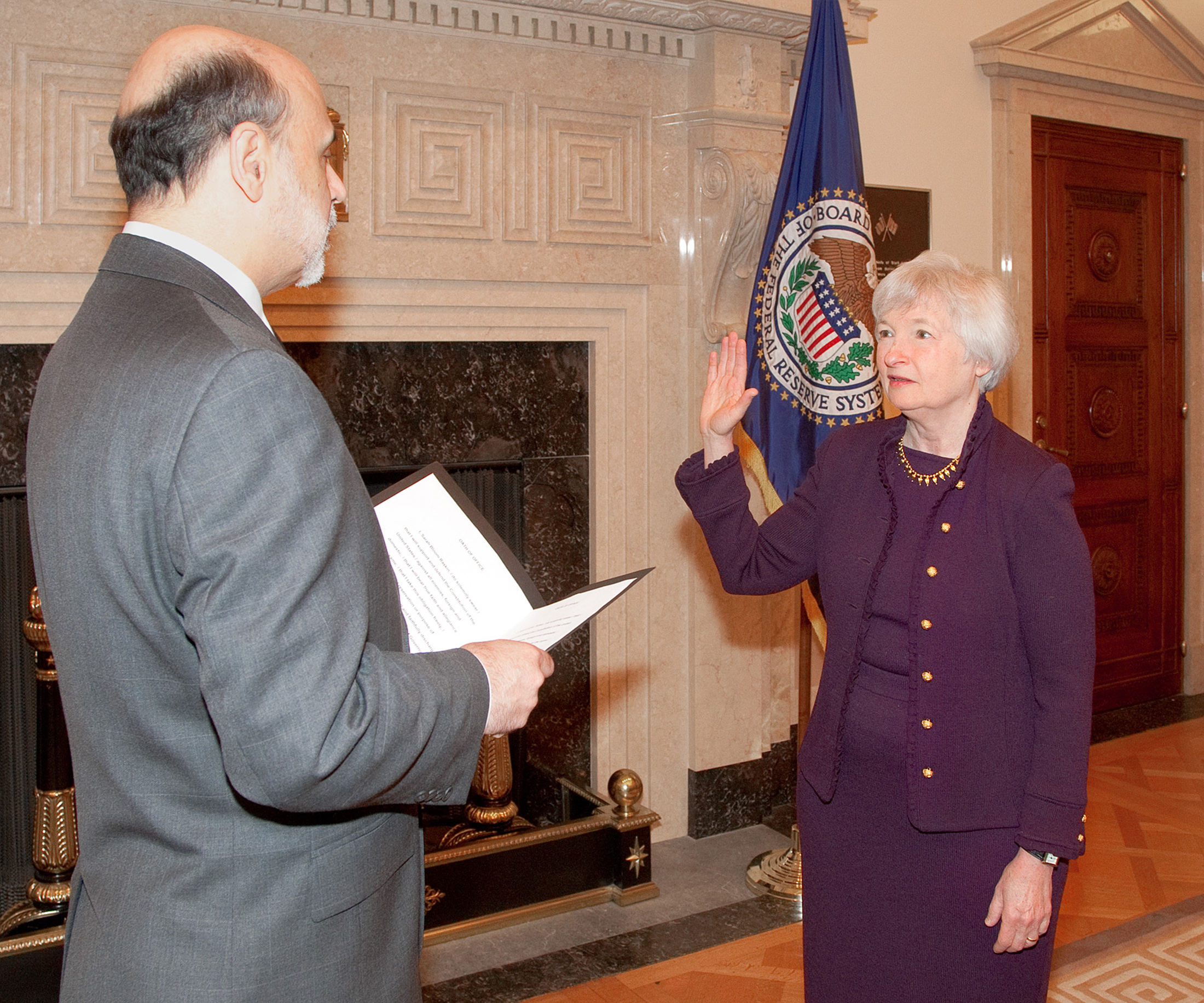
Yellen takes the oath of office administered by Federal Reserve chairman Ben Bernanke in the Eccles Building, October 4, 2010.

On April 28, 2010, President Barack Obama nominated Yellen to succeed Donald Kohn as vice chair of the Federal Reserve. In July 2010, the Senate Banking Committee voted 17–6 to confirm her, though the top Republican on the panel, Sen. Richard Shelby of Alabama, voted no, saying "President Yellen presided over a regional housing bubble and failed to restrain the excesses."

Around the same time, on the heels of related testimony by Fed chairman Bernanke, FOMC voting member James B. Bullard of the St. Louis Fed stated that the U.S. economy was at risk of becoming "enmeshed in a Japanese-style deflationary outcome within the next several years." That statement was interpreted as a possible shift within the FOMC balance between inflation hawks and doves. Yellen's pending confirmation, along with those of Peter Diamond and Sarah Bloom Raskin to fill vacancies, was seen as possibly furthering such a shift in the FOMC. All three nominations were seen as "on track to be confirmed by the Senate."

On September 29, 2010, Yellen, along with Raskin, was confirmed by the Senate on a voice vote to be both a member of the board of governors and vice chairman of the Federal Reserve System. On October 4, the pair were sworn in as Fed governors, while Yellen also took the oath of office as vice chair of the board for a four-year term. Simultaneously, she began a 14-year term as a member of the Federal Reserve Board, filling a vacant seat last held by Mark W. Olson. Yellen was just the second woman to hold the Federal Reserve's No. 2 post, after Alice Rivlin.

In contrast to her predecessors, Yellen acted more independently within the institution in her role as vice chair. She has been urging Bernanke and the other FOMC members to follow her preferred route for monetary policy, arguing for more forceful actions to inject money into the economy to reduce unemployment. Yellen played a leading role in moving the Federal Reserve to announce its inflation target of two percent a year after her long campaign with Chairman Bernanke; she was an early supporter of inflation targeting, facing opposition from Chairman Greenspan during her first stint at the Fed in the 1990s.

Yellen was widely considered the front-runner to succeed Bernanke as the Federal Reserve's chair when his second term ceased. Lawrence Summers, a former President Clinton's Treasury Secretary and former director of President Obama's National Economic Council, was the other leading contender in the highly publicized race; media outlets reported that the president was leaning toward selecting the latter candidate. However, throughout the race, Summers drew criticism from both sides of the aisle for his role in deregulating parts of the banking sector while he served in the Clinton administration. He sparked further controversy for remarks on women's aptitude in math and science, which he made in 2005 while serving as Harvard University's president. In July 2013, Yellen was pushed to be named the first chairwoman of the central bank in a letter that was circulated among the Senate Democrats and had been signed by almost a third of the 54 caucus senators, who primarily represent the liberal wing of the party. In addition, more than 500 professional economists from around 200 colleges and universities across the United States signed an open letter in support of her candidacy for Fed chair and sent it to the White House. After weeks of opposition to his potential nomination, Summers withdrew his name from consideration for the position in September.

=== Chair of the Federal Reserve ===
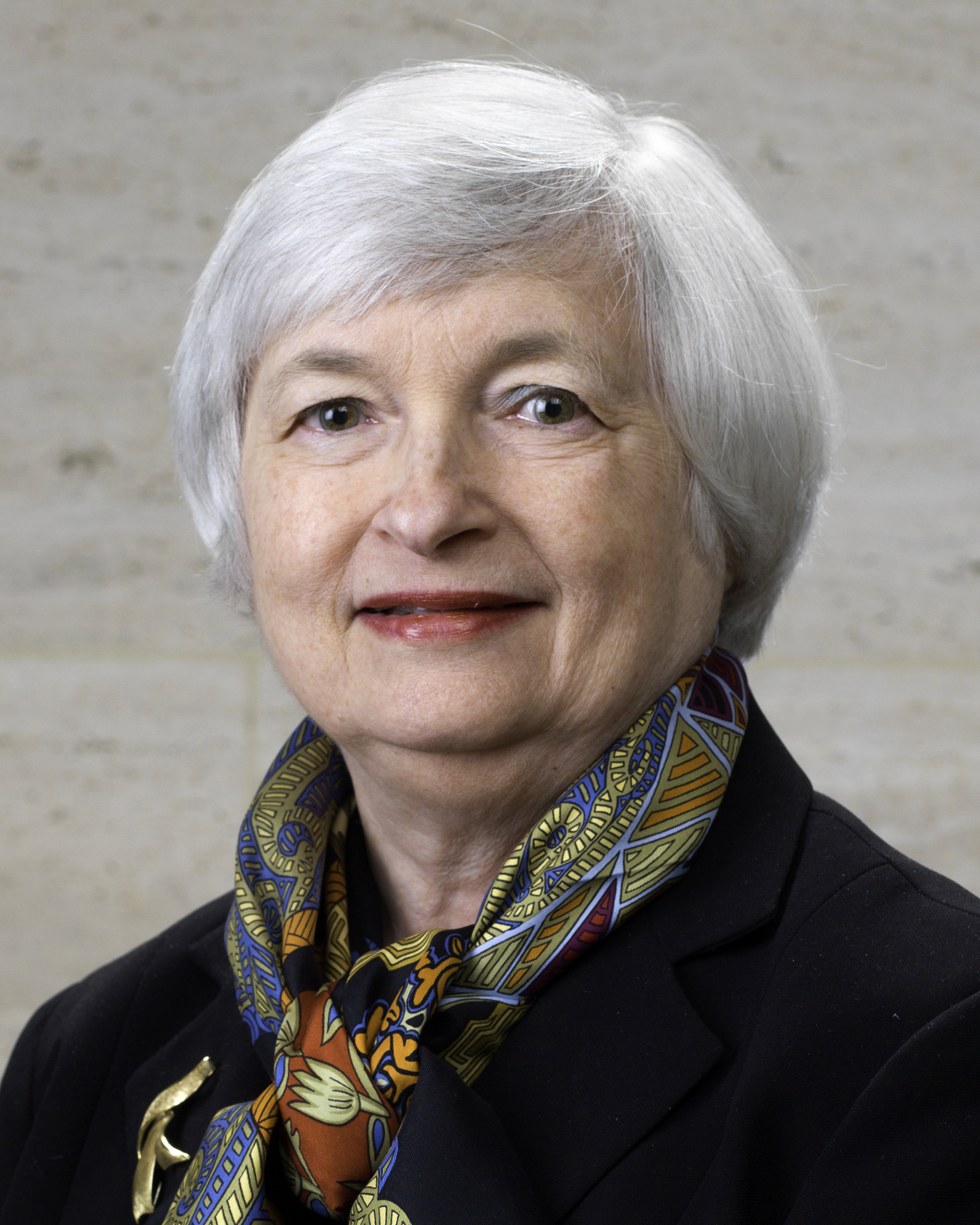
Official portrait as Federal Reserve chair, 2015

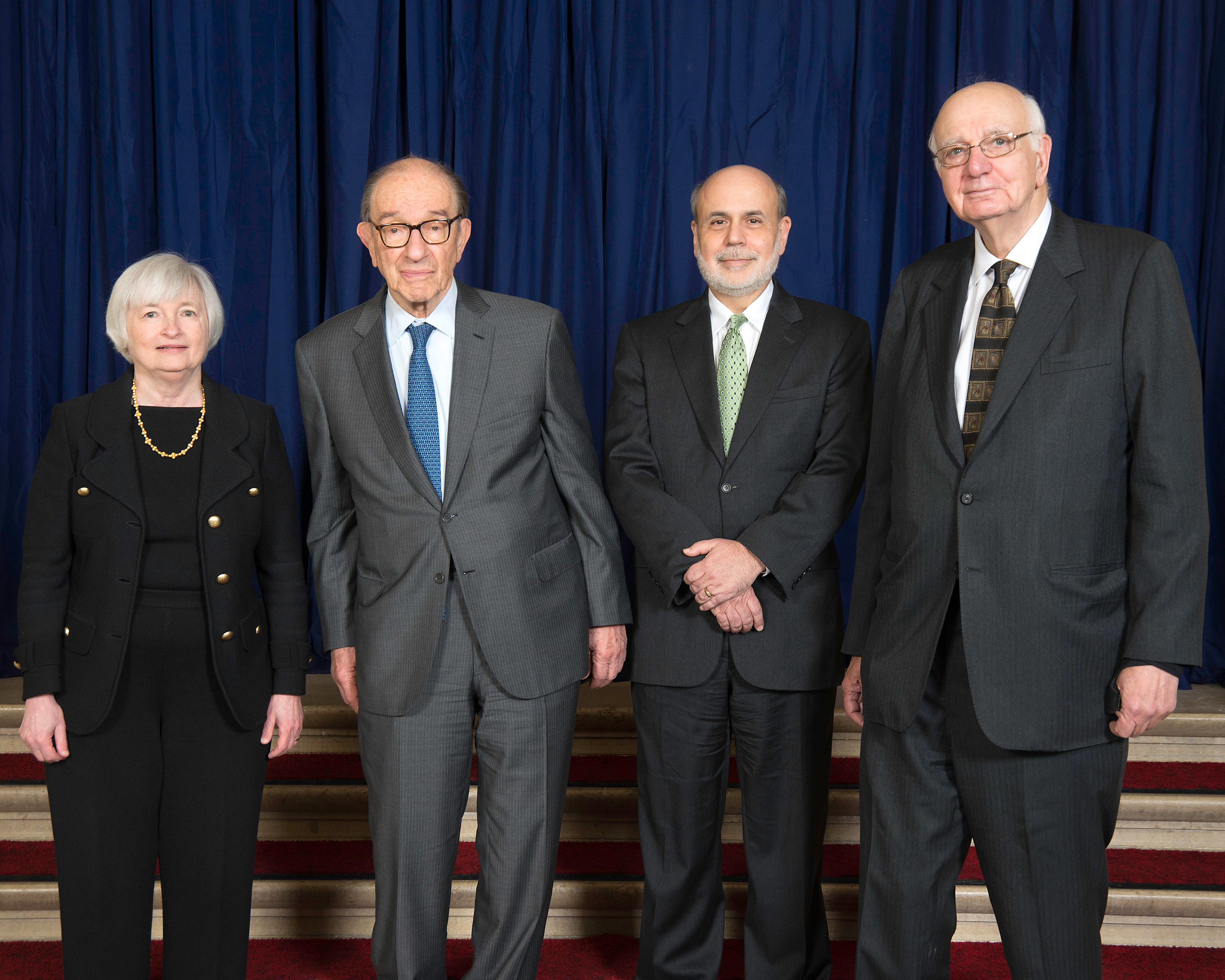
From left to right: Janet Yellen, Alan Greenspan, Ben Bernanke, and Paul Volcker, May 1, 2014

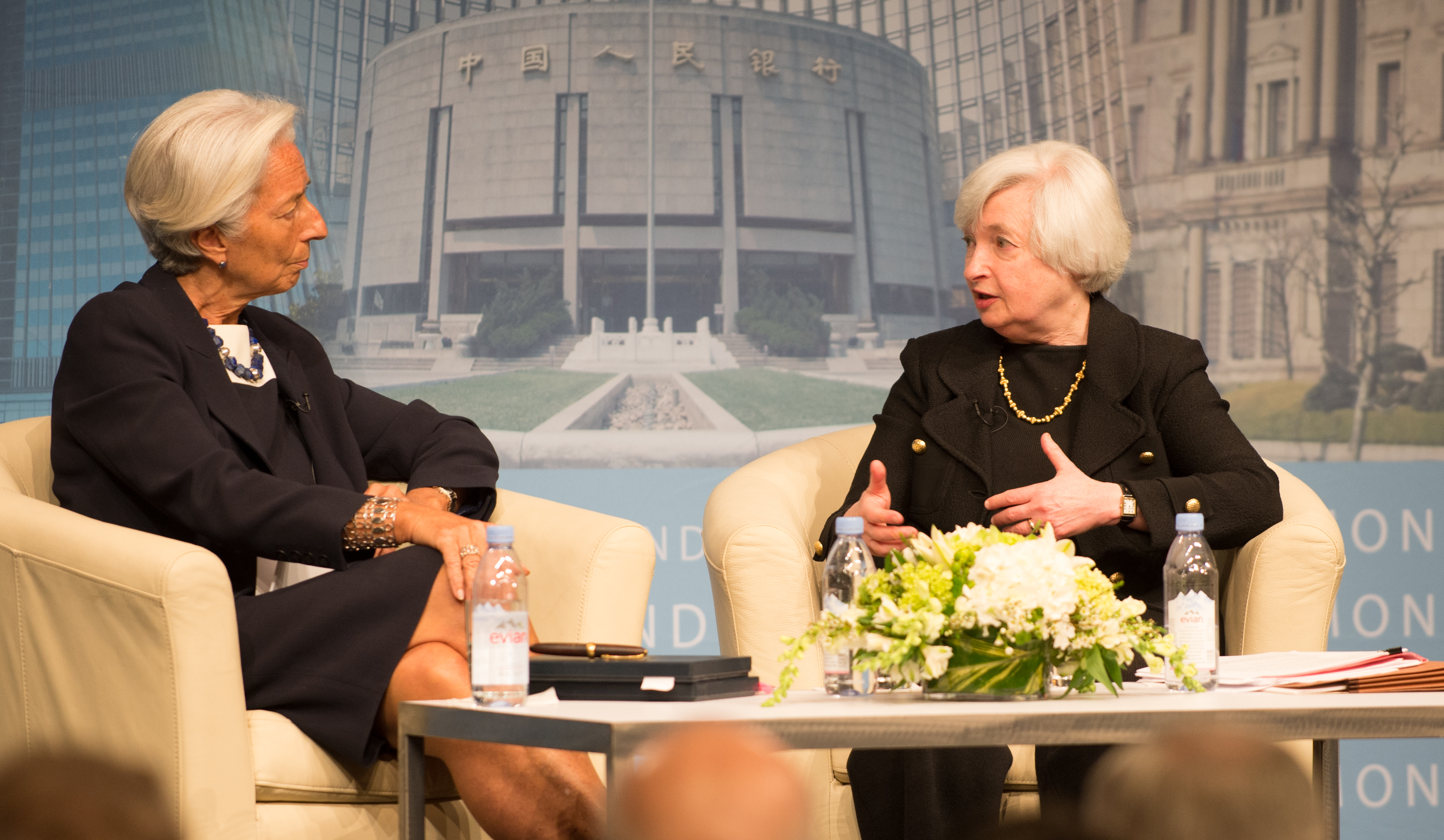
Yellen in conversation with IMF managing director Christine Lagarde, July 2, 2014

On October 9, 2013, Yellen was officially nominated to replace Bernanke as chair of the Federal Reserve, the first vice chair ever to be elevated to that post. While announcing his decision, President Obama called her "one of the nation's foremost economists and policymakers" and said that "America's workers and their families will have a champion in Janet Yellen." During the nomination hearings held in November, Yellen defended the more than $3 trillion in stimulus funds that the central bank had been injecting into the U.S. economy. She also said that it is important for the Fed to try to detect asset bubbles and that if she saw one, she would work to address it.

On December 20, 2013, the U.S. Senate voted 59–34 for cloture on Yellen's nomination. On January 6, 2014, she was confirmed as chair of the Federal Reserve by a vote of 56–26, the narrowest margin ever for the position until Kevin Warsh's nomination in 2026. Yellen was a trailblazer as the first woman to head the U.S. central bank, or any major central bank, and the first Democrat to do so since Paul Volcker assumed that position in 1979 via President Jimmy Carter. She was sworn into office on February 3, 2014, and was previously elected as FOMC chair on January 30. According to a Fed representative, on Yellen's request, her title would be altered to "chair" rather than "chairman" or "chairwoman", as she prefers a gender-neutral manner. Only one woman had ever led the central bank of a G8 country before Yellen – Russia's Elvira Nabiullina.

In July 2014, at her first semi-annual congressional testimony on U S. monetary policy, Yellen said, "while real estate, equities, and corporate bond prices have risen appreciably and valuation metrics have increased they were generally in line with historical norms." She also acknowledged some concerns about the valuations of lower-rated corporate debt and affirmed that she and other Fed officials were monitoring trends but did not believe that a so-called "everything bubble" was forming.

On December 16, 2015, the Federal Reserve under Yellen increased its key interest rate for the first time since 2006. That move was largely expected because extraordinarily low rates for an extremely long time may contribute to financial instability and pose a threat to the economy, and was considered a departure from the previous controversial Fed policy, commonly known as the "Greenspan put". During her tenure, the Fed gradually raised rates four additional times, leaving its key rate in a still-low range of 1.25 percent to 1.5 percent – well below historical standards.

Following the 2016 presidential election, Yellen gave a strong defense of the Dodd–Frank Act in her Joint Economic Committee testimony, standing in opposition to incoming President Donald Trump's plans to review the landmark legislation. She argued that it would be inappropriate to weaken or repeal the law designed to prevent a repeat of the 2008 financial crisis. Yellen provided further support for financial regulations enacted in the wake of the Great Recession in a speech to the Jackson Hole Economic Symposium on August 25, 2017. In her remarks about the aftermath of the crisis, she said, "The balance of research suggests that the core reforms we have put in place have substantially boosted resilience without unduly limiting credit availability or economic growth." Yellen warned that any adjustment to the regulatory framework should be modest and preserve the increase in resilience.

In November 2017, as Yellen's tenure as chair of the Federal Reserve was coming to an end, Trump considered nominating her for another term, but on the advice of his Treasury Secretary Steven Mnuchin, he picked a Republican Fed governor, Jerome Powell, instead. Yellen made her resignation from the Federal Reserve Board at the conclusion of her chairmanship known after Trump's choice, despite still having her assignment as Fed governor until 2024. She served a single term and became just the second Federal Reserve chair eligible for reappointment not renominated by a successor presidential administration, the first being Arthur F. Burns almost 40 years prior. That unusual departure makes her the briefest-serving central bank chief since G. William Miller, who held that office for over a year, from 1978 to 1979.

On February 2, 2018, Yellen enforced enormous sanctions on Wells Fargo, which was the third-largest U.S. bank at the time, with a consent order restricting the firm's expansion unless it resolved its internal issues. That move came in response to a string of "widespread consumer abuses and compliance breakdowns" at the company, particularly a fake account scandal, and marked the first time the Fed has imposed a cap on the entire assets of a financial institution.

Regarding labor markets, Yellen has been dubbed one of the Federal Reserve System's most successful chairpersons. During her term, the unemployment rate dropped from 6.7 percent to 4.1 percent, the lowest in 17 years. For the first time since central bank creation, the economy added jobs throughout every month of any Fed chair's tenure. Yellen completed her time at the Fed with the lowest final unemployment rate of any Fed chair since William McChesney Martin in 1970. Under her leadership, the U.S. unemployment rate fell more than during any other chair's term in the post-World War II era, declining 2.6 percentage points. On the other hand, inflation remained below the Fed's annual two percent target, which led to the suggestion that the central bank could have done even more to bolster the economy without the risk of price increases.

Yellen became the first person in U.S. central bank history to have served as a Federal Reserve chair (2014–2018), vice chair (2010–2014), district president (FRB of San Francisco, 2004–2010), Fed governor (1994–1997 and 2010–2018), and staff economist (1977–1978).

== After the Federal Reserve (2018–2020) ==
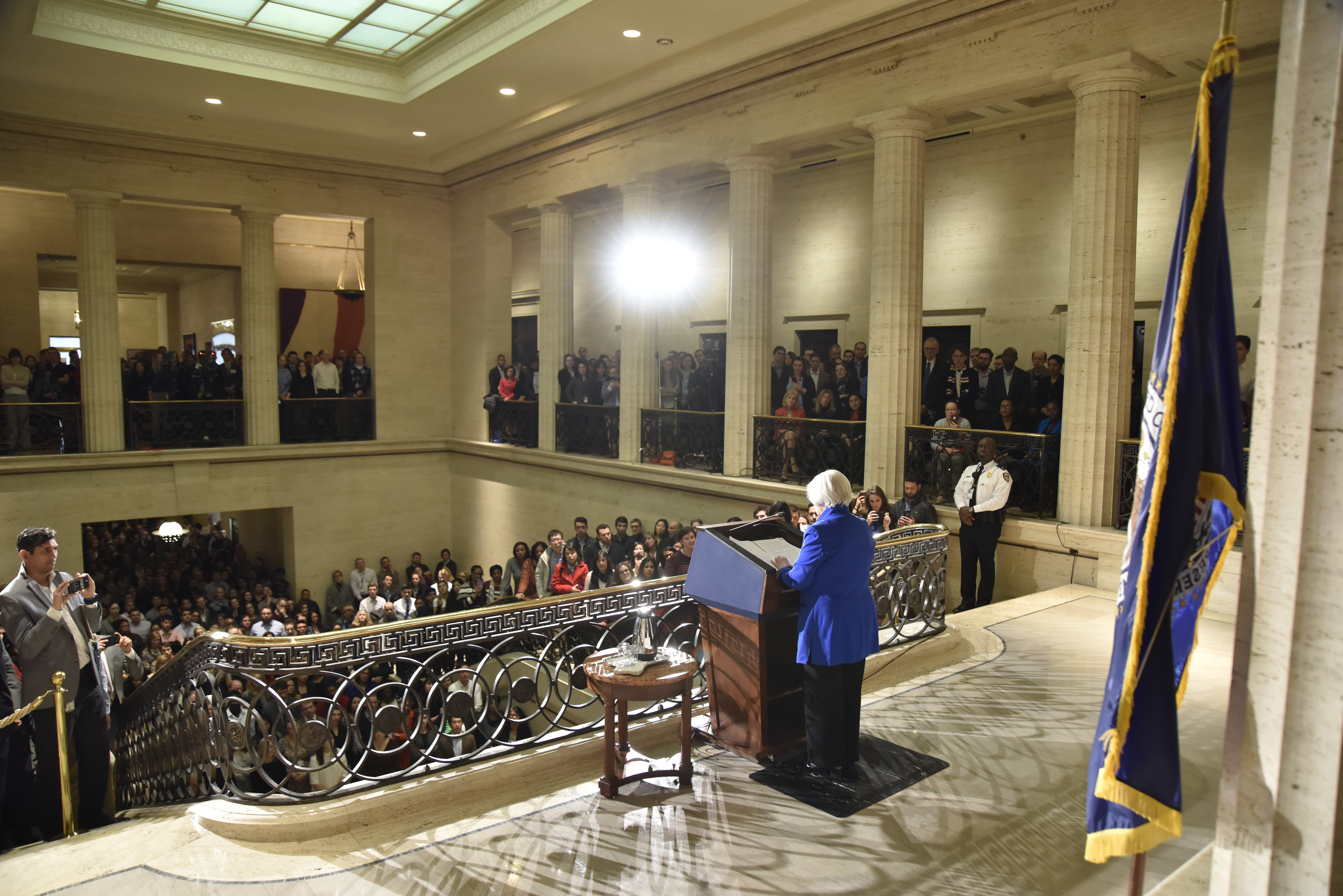
Yellen delivers her farewell speech to Federal Reserve staff, February 1, 2018.

On February 2, 2018, the Brookings Institution announced that Yellen would join the think tank as a distinguished fellow in residence with the Economic Studies program, effective February 5, 2018. She's been affiliated with the Hutchins Center on Fiscal and Monetary Policy at Brookings. On July 31, 2018, the Hutchins Center announced Yellen, James H. Stock, and Louise Sheiner as co-chairs of the newly launched Productivity Measurement Initiative, aimed at improving the quality of economic statistics.

In November 2020, Yellen left her position at Brookings after being selected as a nominee to serve as Treasury secretary. Within the think tank, she has been providing expertise and commentary on a range of economic issues, offering her perspective and analysis at Brookings panels, congressional testimony, lectures across the United States and abroad, and regularly serving as a commentator in the media.

On June 27, 2017, Yellen stated that she did not expect another financial crisis "in our lifetime" because she thought banks were "much stronger" as a result of Federal Reserve oversight. In a December 10, 2018 conversation with Paul Krugman at the City University of New York, she warned of the possibility of another financial crisis by citing "gigantic holes in the system" after she departs from the Federal Reserve.

On February 25, 2019, in an interview with Marketplace, when asked if she believed Trump has "a grasp of macroeconomic policy," Yellen replied, "No, I do not." She expressed her doubts about the president's ability to articulate the Federal Reserve's explicit goals of "maximum employment and price stability" and emphasized his assertions that the Federal Reserve's goals include trade, which she explains are objectively false. She raised further concern over Trump's regard for the independence of the central bank and voiced support for her successor, Jerome Powell. This interview marked a notable change in tone for Yellen, who traditionally handled her differences with the president in a neutral manner.

On July 17, 2020, at the hearing of the House Select Oversight Subcommittee on the Coronavirus Crisis, which was set up by the House Committee on Oversight and Reform, former Federal Reserve chairs Bernanke and Yellen testified about the economic policy response to the negative impact of the coronavirus pandemic. They urged lawmakers to act aggressively with fiscal stimulus in three areas: extending the supplementary unemployment payments; providing additional financial assistance to hard-hit states and local governments; and investing in the medical response to the pandemic. She also expressed this commitment to stimulus in an op-ed for The New York Times with Jared Bernstein, a senior fellow at the Center on Budget and Policy Priorities.

In August 2020, it was reported that Yellen was among a handful of economists who briefed former vice president Joe Biden, the presumptive Democratic nominee for president, and his chosen running mate, Sen. Kamala Harris, on economic issues. The meeting was one of the first times the Biden campaign announced its economic expert, whom few at the time predicted would take a presidential cabinet post.

=== Paid corporate speaking ===
Between 2018 and 2020, Yellen received $7.2 million in speaking fees for 50 speeches at various Wall Street, technology and consulting companies. This included $1 million for giving nine speeches to Citi and $800,000 from the hedge fund Citadel LLC, as well as other paid speeches with Wall Street companies Barclays, Goldman Sachs, UBS and Credit Suisse. Paid speeches with technology companies included Google and Salesforce.

With her return to government, she pledged to get official permission from the Office of Government Ethics (OGE) to participate in substantive issues involving such firms to avoid any conflict of interest.

== Secretary of the Treasury (2021–2025) ==
=== Nomination and confirmation ===
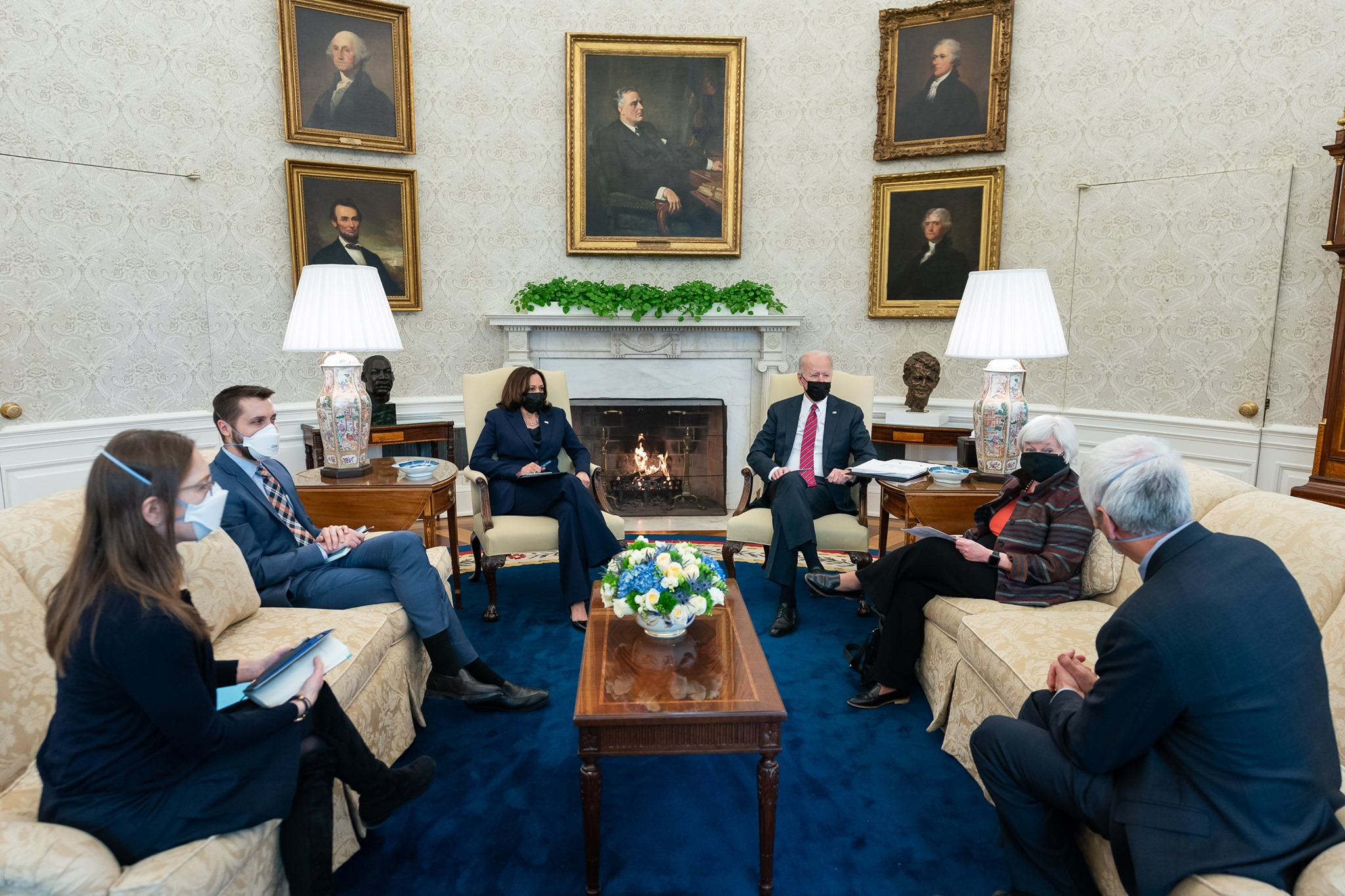
President Joe Biden and Vice President Kamala Harris receive an economic briefing from Treasury Secretary Yellen in the Oval Office, January 29, 2021.

Following the 2020 presidential election, Yellen was routinely mentioned as a possible secretary of the treasury in the incoming Biden administration. She edged out other top contenders to obtain the position, including the sitting Fed Board Gov. Lael Brainard and Roger W. Ferguson Jr., a former central bank vice chairman.

On November 30, 2020, then-President-elect Biden announced he would nominate Yellen as Treasury Secretary in his cabinet. In his remarks on the announcement, Biden lauded her as "one of the most important economic thinkers of our time" who "spent her career focused on employment and the dignity of work." Despite being a highly respected figure across the political spectrum and expected to win confirmation easily, she was considered an unusual pick for the position because of her lack of experience in political maneuvering. Unlike her predecessors, she is viewed as more of an academic economist than a traditional politician used to horse-trading and dealmaking, qualities that could be critical to achieving the goals of Biden's economic agenda in a deeply partisan Congress. All living former U.S. treasury secretaries, from George Shultz to Jack Lew, endorsed Yellen for the position in a bipartisan letter calling on the Senate to swiftly confirm her.

The Senate Finance Committee unanimously approved Yellen's candidacy by a 26–0 vote on January 22, 2021. The full U.S. Senate confirmed her nomination with a vote of 84–15 (with one abstention, Marco Rubio, R-FL) on January 25. With her oath of office administered by Vice President Harris the next day, Yellen became the first female Secretary of the Treasury and the first person in American history to lead the three most powerful economic bodies in the federal government: the Treasury Department, the Federal Reserve, and the White House Council of Economic Advisers.

Yellen became just the third woman to hold the finance minister portfolio within the G7 nations, following Christine Lagarde of France and Chrystia Freeland of Canada. During her tenure as treasury secretary, Yellen and U.S. treasurer Lynn Malerba were also the first two women to have their signatures appear together on the U.S. currency.

=== Tenure ===
==== Proposed international tax reform ====
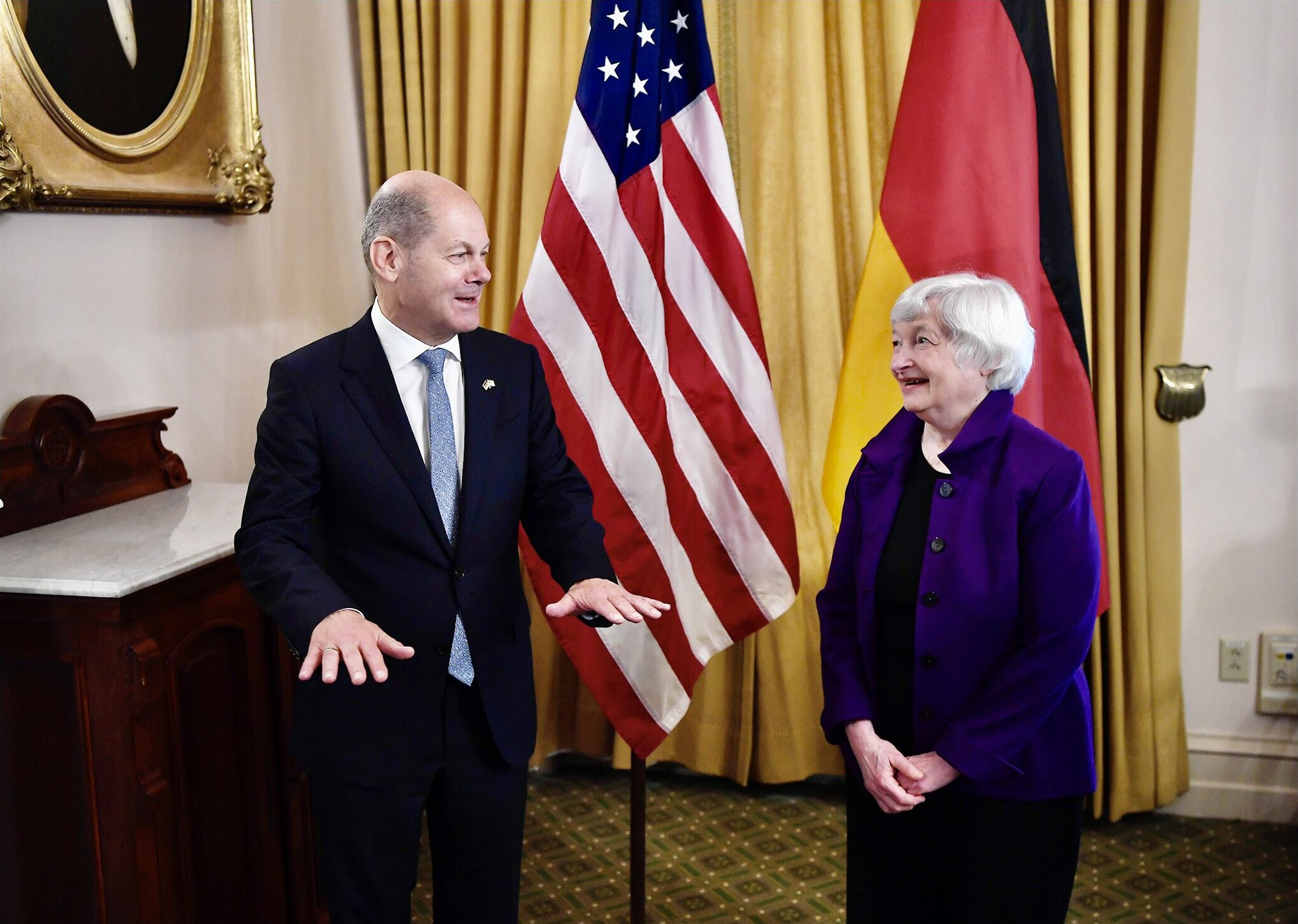
Yellen meeting with German finance minister Olaf Scholz, July 2, 2021

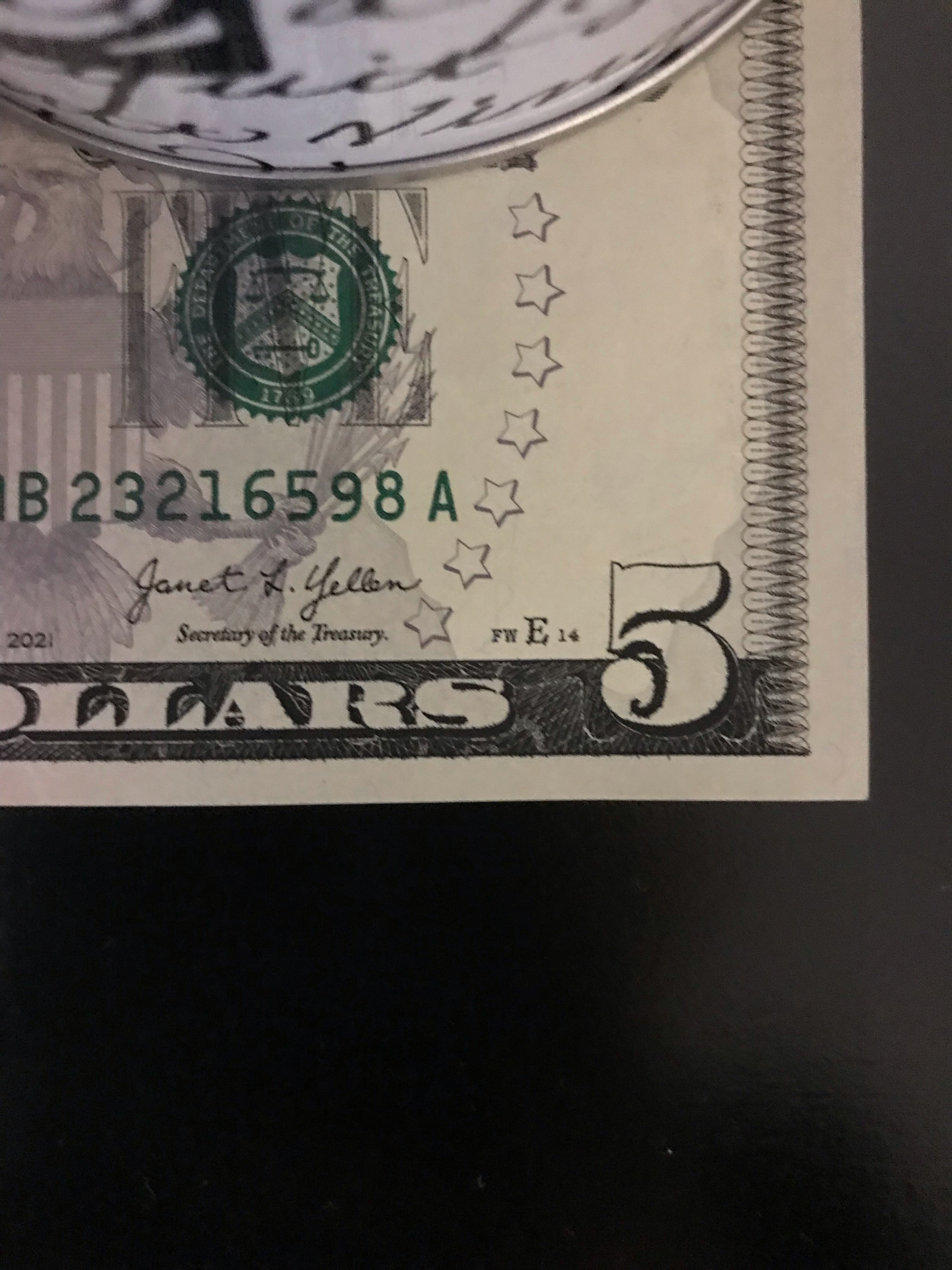
A close-up of a United States five-dollar bill featuring Yellen's signature

In April 2021, Yellen proposed a global minimum corporate tax rate that would prevent profit shifting by multinational companies for tax avoidance. In an accompanying written piece for The Wall Street Journal, she outlined the enormous benefits of the discussed tax system for the US economy as well as the global economy. On June 5, 2021, finance ministers from the Group of Seven (G7) agreed to reinstate a minimum worldwide corporate tax rate of at least 15% as part of a landmark deal to modernize the international tax system, while France's Bruno Le Maire called it "a starting point" that could be increased in the future. A few days later, Treasury Secretary Yellen co-wrote an op-ed for The Washington Post with four of her international counterparts, describing the new agreement as "an historic opportunity to end the race to the bottom in corporate taxation, restoring government resources at a time when they are most needed." The next month, financial leaders from the G20 countries came to an agreement on plans to put an end to global tax havens, force multinational corporations to pay an appropriate share of tax wherever they operate, and create a "more stable and fair international tax architecture."

In October 2021, more than 130 countries, accounting for more than 90% of global GDP, including several low-tax jurisdictions that had previously fought the pact, enforced through the OECD a landmark agreement to establish a global minimum tax rate of 15% for businesses worldwide. The projected gain from the deal, which was anticipated to take effect in 2023, would result in an increase of $150 billion in annual tax revenues. The treaty's implementation path remained uncertain because its ratification requires a two-thirds majority in the evenly divided U.S. Senate as well as passing domestic legislation in each of the signed countries.

==== Debt ceiling crisis ====
On July 23, 2021, Yellen sent a letter to House Speaker Nancy Pelosi and other congressional leaders in which she urged lawmakers to increase or suspend the nation's debt limit as soon as possible before it hit its statutory limit in August and the government would be unable to pay its bills. She warned Congress that failing to meet those financial obligations would cause "irreparable harm" to the U.S. economy and that the Treasury Department would take "extraordinary measures" to prevent the United States from suffering a government shutdown or even a debt default.

On September 19, 2021, Yellen, in an op-ed for The Wall Street Journal, again called for an increase in the debt ceiling; otherwise, sometime in October, the Treasury expected to exhaust its cash reserves, which would trigger a financial crisis. After lawmakers adopted a short-term debt ceiling bill to raise the United States' borrowing limit through early December, she said that a longer-term measure should be provided to ensure certainty in government's solvency. In November, Yellen expressed her willingness to consider solutions to the debt crisis without GOP support if necessary, using a budget reconciliation as a viable alternative. She also supported the idea for Democrats to raise the debt limit high enough that it would not be reached until after the 2024 general elections while the party holds a majority in both houses of Congress, therefore preventing the issue from being weaponized for political reasons.

In December 2021, President Biden signed a debt ceiling increase into law, preventing a U.S. default, a day after the Treasury's previously estimated deadline to address the issue. Congressional legislation designated to cover the government's financial commitments beyond the 2022 midterm elections was passed in a nearly party-line vote.

In January 2023, after Republicans took control over the House, Yellen informed House Speaker Kevin McCarthy and new congressional leadership that the U.S. expected to hit the debt ceiling on January 19 and that the Treasury yet again would be forced to use "extraordinary measures" to prevent default, and it could last until June of that year. She repeated her call to "act in a timely manner to increase or suspend the debt limit." Yellen rejected the GOP plan on government payments prioritization once "extraordinary measures" are exhausted, insisting that her department doesn't have the systems to do so and that proposal effectively means a default.

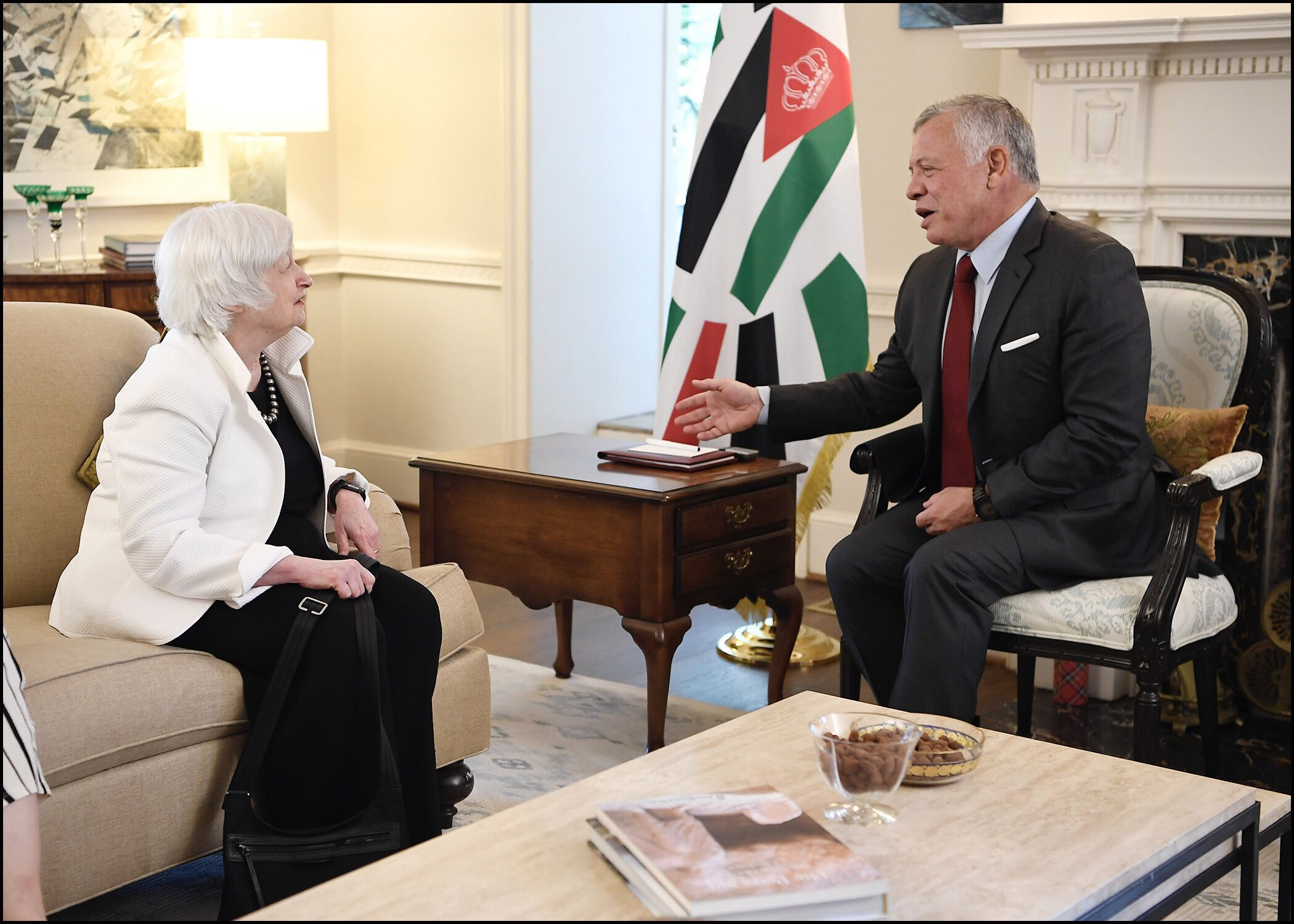
Yellen with King Abdullah II of Jordan, July 20, 2021

On June 3, 2023, President Biden signed into law bipartisan congressional legislation that suspended the public debt limit throughout his first term in office, therefore ending the ongoing debt-ceiling crisis. It came as a compromise on fiscal spending between the White House and House Republicans two days before the United States was estimated to reach the debt ceiling and subsequently could no longer meet its own financial obligations.

In September 2023, Yellen said she was not worried about the $33 trillion federal government debt.

==== Sanctions against Russia and oil price cap ====
In November 2021, Yellen and senior Treasury personnel were tasked with crafting a sanctions strategy that would maximize the costs inflicted on Russia's economy while limiting, if possible, the expected negative impact on the United States and its allies if a potential aggression began. The Treasury Department worked closely across government agencies and with US allies abroad to impose unprecedented international sanctions in response to the Russian invasion of Ukraine in February 2022.

Yellen was a key proponent of a price cap on Russian oil, a plan designed to deprive the Kremlin of funding for Russia's war in Ukraine while reducing an inflation surge by preserving the global oil supply. On December 2, 2022, following months of lobbying and negotiations by the United States, the emerging alliance of the G7 nations, the European Union, and Australia agreed to cap the price of Russian oil at $60 per barrel as an upper limit, with regular reviews to check that the ceiling stays at least 5 percent below average market prices.

==== Digital Assets Regulation ====
On April 7, 2022, at American University's Kogod School of Business Center for Innovation, Yellen addressed for the first time the growing impact of digital assets on the American economy. Yellen outlined policy objectives and lessons that apply to the navigation of emerging technologies, which include "first, the U.S. financial system benefits from responsible innovation; second, it's often society's vulnerable who suffer most in an economic crisis when regulation is not moving at the same pace as innovation; third, regulation should focus on activities and risk, not technology; fourth, sovereign money is the core of a functioning financial system; and fifth, it'll take thoughtful public and private dialogue between various groups to move forward."

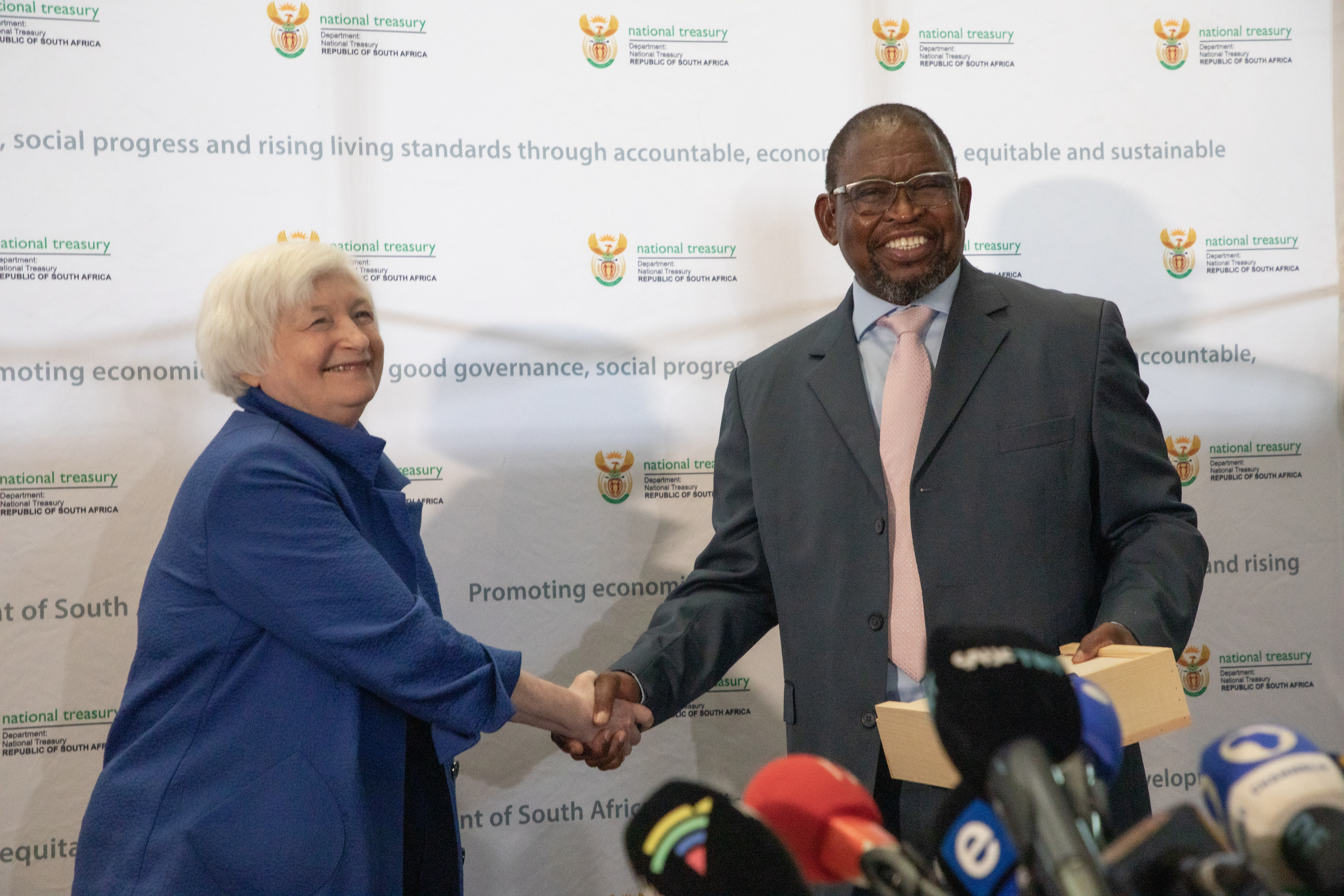
Yellen with South African finance minister Enoch Godongwana in November 2022

Yellen also announced possible plans for a government version of a stablecoin; the administration is studying the possibility of issuing a central bank digital currency (CBDC) or digital dollar while taking into consideration the impact of a CBDC on monetary policy, national security, and international trade, as well as its utility for consumers. Solving such problems is an "engineering challenge that would require years of development, not months," she said.

==== Friendshoring of supply chains ====
In a speech delivered at the Atlantic Council on April 13, 2022, Yellen advised against the supply chain risks posed by reliance on commodities from countries that aligned with authoritarian regimes like Russia or China and favored friendshoring strategy, an approach that limits supply chain networks to allies and partner countries. She said that any moves from the other nations to undermine collective international effort to make Russia accountable for its aggression would draw the ire of the U.S. and its allies. Yellen also called for the modernization of international financial institutions so that they could meet the world's 21st-century challenges, invoking precedent of the Bretton Woods Conference, which was held during the Second World War to discuss post-war economic order.

In December 2022, Yellen wrote an essay for Project Syndicate in which she singled out the key risks for the U.S. economy that may be mitigated with the implementation of friendshoring policies. Those risks include: "first, over-concentration of critical goods in any particular market may result in vulnerability in supply chains that hurt workers and customers; second, the need to protect from geopolitical and security risks emanating from hostile states; and third, the need to shift away from supply chains that relied on violations of core human rights, such as the use of forced labor in producing goods for import."

==== Comments on Roe v. Wade overturning ====
On May 10, 2022, during a Senate Banking Committee hearing, Yellen made comments on the economic consequences of Roe v. Wade overturning after a leaked draft majority opinion in Dobbs v. Jackson Women's Health Organization showed the Supreme Court was poised to overrule its previous decisions that legalized abortion in the United States. Sen. Bob Menendez (D-NJ) asked what reversing the landmark ruling would mean economically for the United States; Yellen responded, "I believe that eliminating the right of women to make decisions about when and whether to have children would have very damaging effects on the economy and would set women back decades." She added that keeping women from accessing abortions "increases their odds of living in poverty or need for public assistance." Sen. Tim Scott (R-SC) disagreed with her assertion and said, "I think finding a way to have a debate around abortion in a meeting for the economic stability of our country is harsh." She replied, "This is not harsh. This is the truth."

Following that exchange, Senator Scott penned an op-ed for The Washington Post in which he called Yellen's claim "simply false" and compared her arguments to those of Margaret Sanger in support of eugenics. This prompted further backlash in conservative-leaning media sources. Yellen's comments are supported by economic research, as reproductive rights affect women's participation in the workforce, ability to pursue higher education, and reduce the risk of financial hardship.

==== Internal Revenue Service reforms ====
After the passage of the Inflation Reduction Act in August 2022, Yellen directed the Internal Revenue Service (IRS) to use $80 billion in additional funding over a decade to clear backlogs, improve taxpayer services, update technology, and hire thousands of new employees.

In June 2023, the Fiscal Responsibility Act, which was passed to reach a bipartisan agreement on debt ceiling, reallocated more than a quarter of the funding previously approved for IRS modernization to other budgetary areas. Despite that, Yellen assured that the agency still possesses the resources it needs in the near term to enhance service and ramp up enforcement. Furthermore, she said that the Treasury Department would continue to advocate for additional funds to make service improvements and help ensure that high-end taxpayers don't avoid paying their fair share.

==== Visit to Ukraine ====
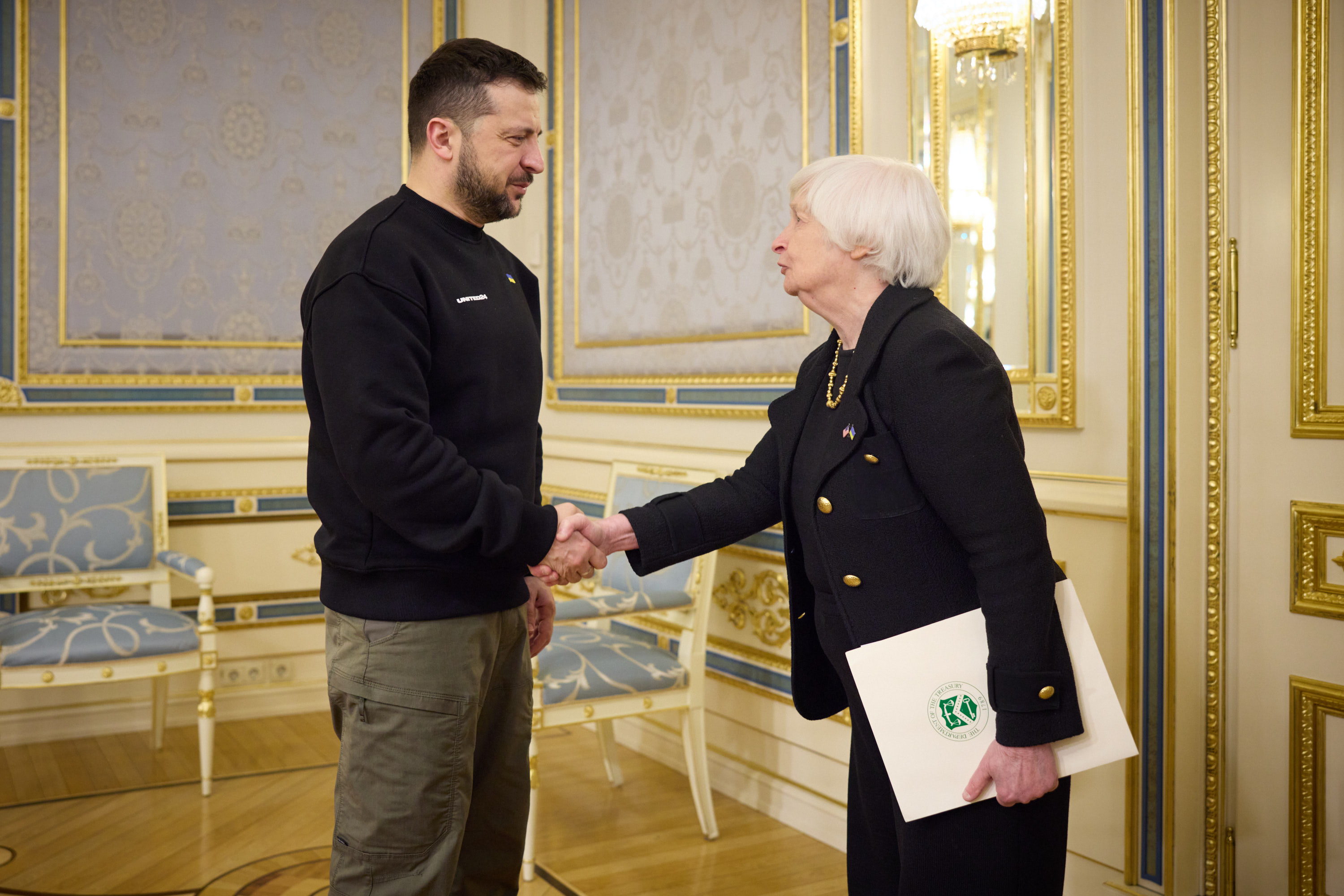
Yellen with Ukrainian president Volodymyr Zelenskyy, February 27, 2023

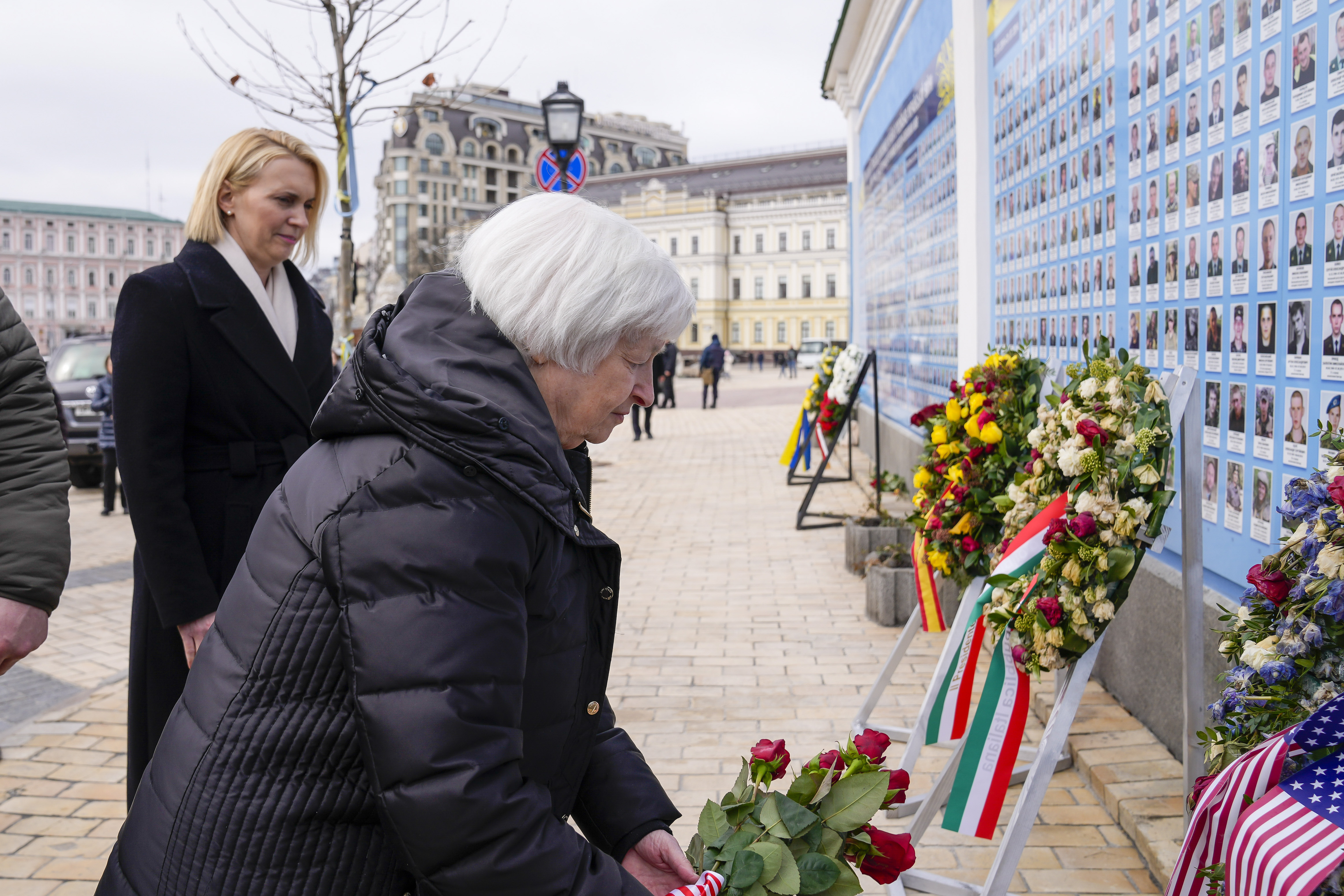
Yellen laying flowers in memory of fallen Ukrainian soldiers at the Saint Michael's Square, February 27, 2023

On February 27, 2023, Yellen made a surprise visit to Kyiv, in which she reaffirmed ongoing U.S. economic support for Ukraine in its struggle against Russia's invasion, including nearly $50 billion in security, financial, and humanitarian aid the federal government has provided over the past year as Ukraine's largest bilateral donor. She met with Ukrainian president Volodymyr Zelenskyy and the country's prime minister, Denys Shmyhal, to discuss the rollout of about $1.25 billion in budget relief, the first of a $10 billion package of civilian assistance for things like schools, hospitals, and emergency services, among others.

Coinciding with her visit, Yellen wrote an op-ed for The New York Times in which she highlighted the importance of America's support and repeated President Biden's message that Washington will stand with the Ukrainian people for as long as it takes. She said, "We cannot allow Ukraine to lose the war for economic reasons when it has shown an ability to succeed on the battlefield."

==== Banking crisis ====
On March 12, 2023, amidst the banking crisis, Yellen made an appearance on CBS' Face the Nation and affirmed that financial regulators closely monitored the state of the banking system to make sure it remained safe and well-capitalized. Addressing the collapse of Silicon Valley Bank, which marked the second-largest bank failure in American history at the time, she said she had been working with bank regulators to "design appropriate policies" to tackle the issue, though declining to provide further details. She stressed that the possibility of a bailout was off the table. Despite her statement, on the same day, Yellen approved actions enabling the Federal Deposit Insurance Corporation (FDIC) to complete its resolution of Silicon Valley Bank in a manner that fully protects all depositors by announcing a systemic risk exception, with similar provisions being made for Signature Bank, another failed lender. These extraordinary measures were taken to ensure confidence in the U.S. banking system and prevent spreading of a bank run.

On March 21, Yellen delivered a speech to an American Bankers Association (ABA) summit in which she defended the forceful actions taken by regulators to avert a sweeping banking crisis and pledged resolute Biden administration support for lenders in need, regardless of their respective sizes. She said, "Our intervention was necessary to protect the broader U.S. banking system," and it was "not focused on aiding specific banks or classes of banks." Yellen went on to assure that "similar actions could be warranted if smaller institutions suffer deposit runs that pose the risk of contagion."

Nevertheless, Yellen stated in her testimony before the Senate Appropriations Subcommittee on Financial Services and General Government the following day that the FDIC was not considering providing "blanket insurance or guarantees of deposits." She said uninsured bank deposits beyond the law-established $250,000 limit could be protected only if a failed bank was deemed to pose a systemic risk to the financial system, and that determination would occur only on a case-by-case basis by the regulators.

On April 21, Yellen announced a proposal by the Financial Stability Oversight Council (FSOC) for a new procedure to designate nonbank financial companies as systemically important financial institutions, subjecting them to Federal Reserve supervision. It marked an effective reversal of previous guidance, which was issued in 2019 under the Trump administration and, according to Yellen, "created inappropriate hurdles as part of the designation process." She said such a designation process "could take six years to complete, which could prevent the council from acting to address an emerging risk to financial stability before it's too late." The revised guidance relied on a quantitative and qualitative analysis under which the council determined whether "material financial distress at the company or the company's activities could pose a threat to U.S. financial stability" and allowed for ample engagement between regulators and the company under review.

On May 18, the Bank Policy Institute (BPI) convened a meeting of more than two dozen bank CEOs to discuss the current state of the economy. Citing sources familiar with the matter, CNN Business reported on Yellen's remarks that more bank mergers may be necessary to overcome the sector's crisis.

==== Economic approach to China ====
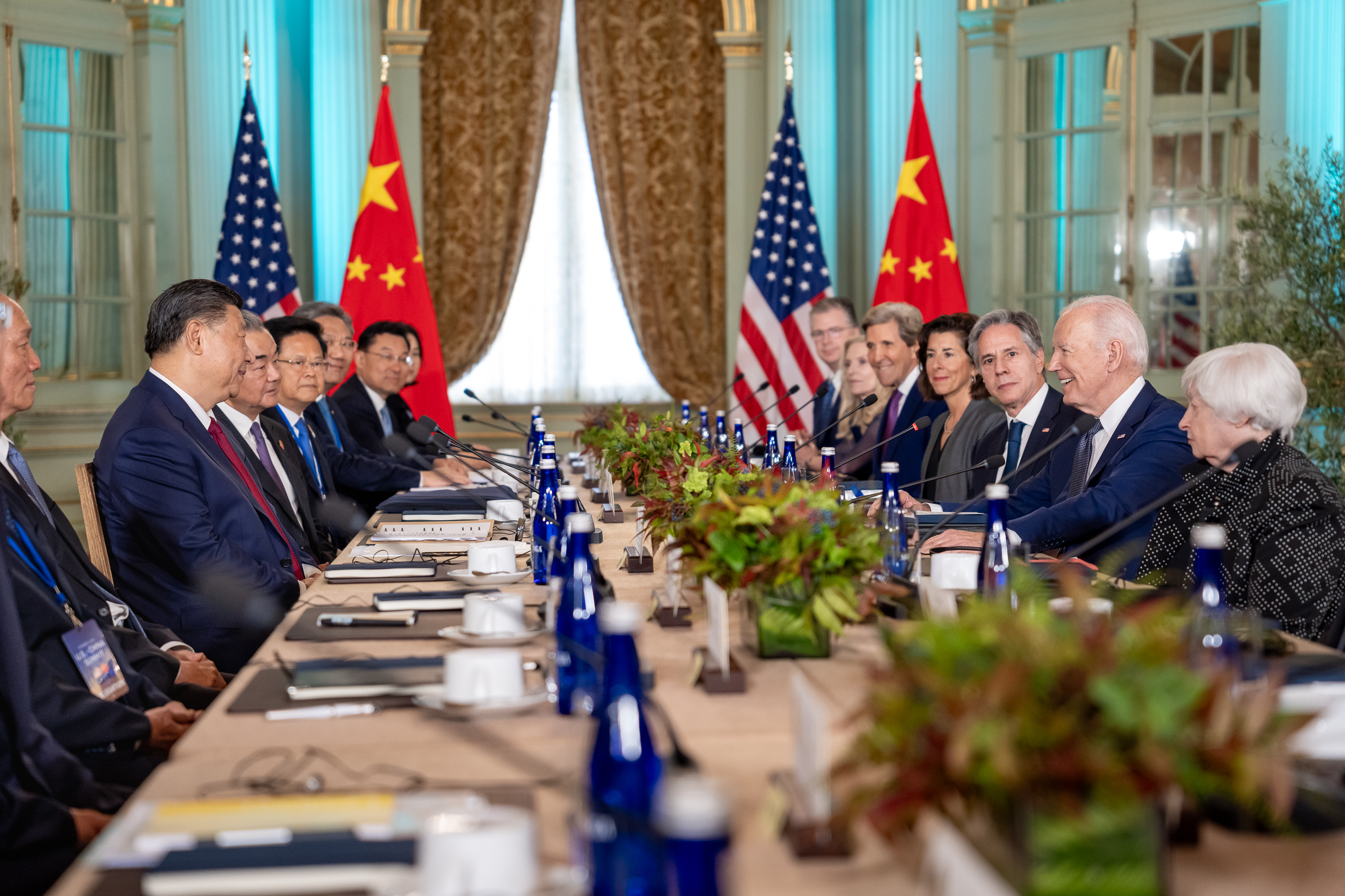
Yellen with US president Joe Biden and Chinese president Xi Jinping at the Filoli Estate in Woodside, California, November 15, 2023

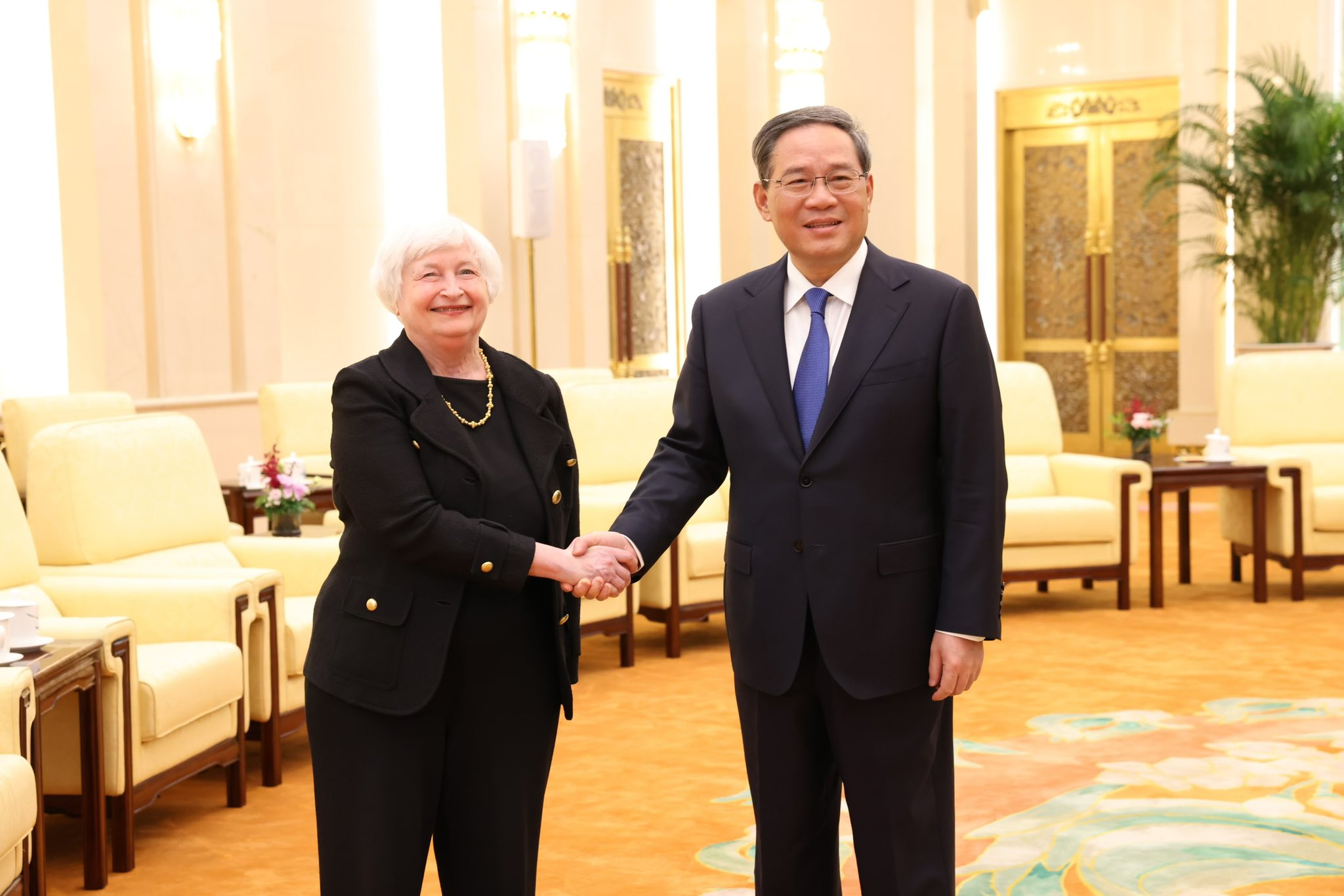
Yellen meets Chinese premier Li Qiang in July 2023

In a speech delivered at Johns Hopkins University's School of Advanced International Studies on April 20, 2023, Yellen laid out three principal objectives of the Biden administration's economic approach toward China. Those principles are: first, the paramount importance of securing American national security interests as well as protecting human rights; second, seeking healthy and fair economic competition with China based on international rules; and third, aiming to engage on major global challenges like easing the debt burden of the developing world and climate change. Though she emphasized that national security would always take priority if it collided with economics, her address ought to be interpreted as an olive branch to Beijing instead of the confrontation that has for a long time prevailed in relations between the two nations. Yellen's speech attempted to revive dialogue, at least on economic matters, as she made clear her desire to visit China as soon as possible to get the countries' previously pragmatic approach to each other back on track. However, its ultimate success is not at all obvious.

Between July 6–9, Yellen visited China, the first trip to the country by a U.S. Treasury secretary in four years and her first since taking office. She began her visit by holding informal talks with the country's former vice premier Liu He, and People's Bank of China (PBC) governor Yi Gang about the state of their domestic economies, as well as the global outlook, in a bid to reopen communication lines and find areas of common economic ground between the two nations. Yellen then met with China's newly appointed economic team, including Premier Li Qiang, Vice Premier He Lifeng, finance minister Liu Kun, and Chinese Communist Party (CCP) central bank chief Pan Gongsheng. During those bilateral meetings, she reaffirmed that the US national security restrictions on Chinese investment were intended to be narrowly focused and not have broad effects on the country's economy. Yellen also expressed concerns about Chinese economic policies and went on to criticize the country's authorities for their treatment of foreign, particularly American, companies; she stated, "We seek healthy economic competition that is not winner-take-all but that, with a fair set of rules, can benefit both countries over time."

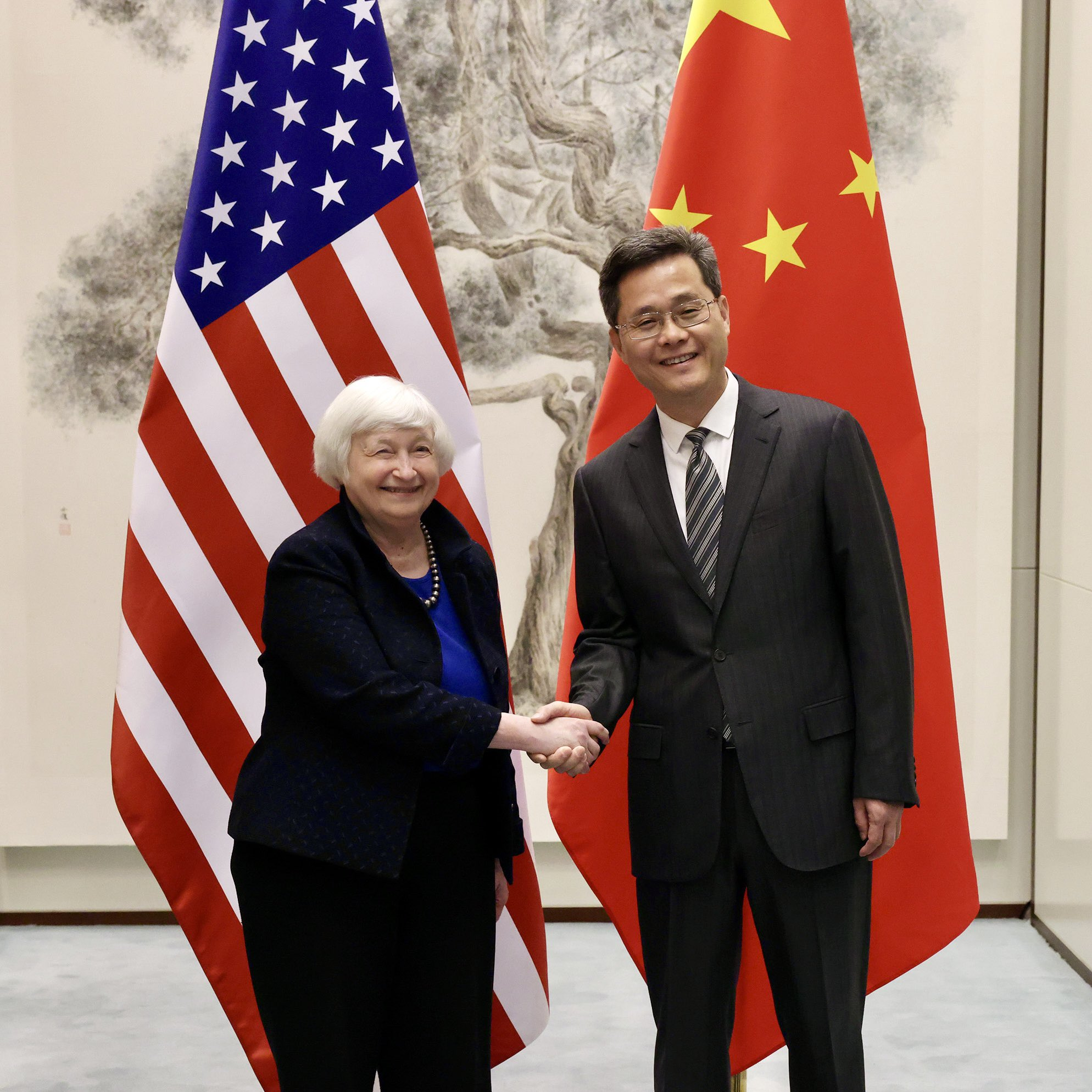
Yellen with Chinese finance minister Lan Fo'an in Beijing, 7 April 2024

Overall, Yellen's visit was part of a broader push by the Biden administration to rebuild bridges between the two countries and open more lines of high-level communication with America's main geopolitical rival, in particular with China's new economic leaders. In a press conference capping her four-day trip to Beijing, Yellen described it as a mission to revive engagement between the two largest economies and said she believes it has brought US-China ties closer to a "surer footing."

"We certainly have improved communication," Yellen said regarding China in an October interview with Sky News. The U.S. established a set of principles to govern Sino-American relations, Yellen said. These principles are: 1. The U.S. will always protect its national security and call out human rights abuses, 2. The U.S. is not seeking to decouple economically from China, and 3. The U.S. and China need to cooperate on a variety of global challenges, including climate change and debt relief.

Comments on Israel

When asked about the potential economic implications of Israel's war on Gaza, Yellen told Sky News in an October 2023 interview, "I think it's too early to speculate on whether or not there will be significant consequences. I think, importantly, it depends on whether the hostilities extend beyond Israel and Gaza, and that's certainly an outcome we would like to avoid."

Yellen maintained that the U.S. can manage funding wars in both Israel and Ukraine, saying, "America can certainly afford to stand with Israel and to support Israel's military needs and we also can and must support Ukraine in its struggle against Russia." She warned Iran that nothing is "off the table" for sanctions if Tehran is linked to the Hamas-led attack on Israel.

== Economic philosophy ==
Yellen is widely considered to be a "dove" on monetary policy (i.e., more concerned with unemployment than with inflation) and, as such, generally favors lower rather than higher Federal Reserve interest rates. She was overall in favor of more stringent financial regulation to lessen systemic risks brought on by flaws in the financial system. Yellen was arguably the most liberal Federal Reserve leader since Marriner S. Eccles, who was appointed by President Franklin D. Roosevelt amidst the Great Depression in 1934. On fiscal policy, publications frequently refer to her as "sort of" a deficit hawk. She expressed concern about the United States fiscal path prior to the COVID-19 recession, particularly about the national debt; in 2018, she said, "If I had a magic wand, I would raise taxes and cut retirement spending." The following year, she again suggested that she favored both raising revenue and making changes to the Medicare, Medicaid, and Social Security programs to control spending. In September 2021, at a House Financial Services Committee hearing, Yellen lent support to efforts for the complete removal of the debt ceiling, arguing that the borrowing cap is "very destructive" and poses an unnecessary threat to the American economy.

In January 2019, Yellen was among the 45 original signers of the Economists' Statement on Carbon Dividends, which was eventually signed by over 3,500 prominent American economists promoting a carbon dividends framework for the U.S. policy on climate change. In October 2020, the Group of Thirty's Steering Committee Working Group on Climate Change and Finance, which Yellen co-chaired with Mark Carney, prepared a report that developed a robust and inclusive strategy to amplify and mainstream the global transition to a net-zero emissions economy. The study calls upon governments, businesses, and financial institutions to assess climate risks and supports a phase-in of carbon pricing to accelerate a shift to carbon neutrality.

Yellen is a Keynesian economist and has been described as a "Keynesian to her fingertips". In April 1999, Yellen discussed her views on the application of Keynesian economics to policymaking at the Yale economics department reunion. She stated that while most economists "appreciate the value of markets and incentives," Yalies "can recognize when they are not operating correctly and have higher concern for policies to remedy them." During the 2008 financial crisis, she "warned against an over-hasty removal of stimulus," and "believes the state has a duty to tackle poverty and inequality." When her appointment as treasury secretary was announced, Yellen was viewed by Wall Street as a "Treasury secretary who will push hard for expansionary policies aimed at boosting growth, profits and share prices," although the ability of Yellen to push through her preferred fiscal policies was seen as likely to be constrained by congressional gridlock.

== Honors and awards ==
Yellen has received numerous honors in recognition of her career in academia and politics. These include:

=== Academic ===
Chancellor, visitor, governor, rector, and fellowships
Location	Date	Organization	Position
New York	1986–1987	John Simon Guggenheim Memorial Foundation	Guggenheim Fellowship
Connecticut	2000–2006	Yale Corporation	Alumni Fellow
California	2003–2004	Western Economic Association International	President
Tennessee	2004–2005	American Economic Association	Vice President: Served with Angus Deaton
California	2013–present	University of California, Berkeley	Berkeley Fellow
Tennessee	2020–2021	American Economic Association	President

Honorary degrees
Location	Date	School	Degree	Gave Commencement Address
Rhode Island	May 25, 1998	Brown University	Doctor of Laws (LL.D.)	Yes
New York	May 27, 2000	Bard College	Doctor of Humane Letters (DHL)	No
New York	May 21, 2014	New York University	Doctor of Commercial Science (DCS)	Yes
England	May 15, 2015	London School of Economics	Doctor of Science (DSc)	No
Connecticut	May 15, 2015	Yale University	Doctor of Social Science (DSSc)	No
England	November 19, 2015	University of Warwick	Doctor of Laws (LL.D.)	No
Maryland	December 19, 2016	University of Baltimore	Doctor of Laws (LL.D.)	Yes
Israel	June 5, 2019	Tel Aviv University	Doctor of Philosophy (Ph.D.)	No
Michigan	December 15, 2019	University of Michigan	Doctor of Laws (LL.D.)	No
Pennsylvania	May 17, 2021	University of Pennsylvania	Doctor of Laws (LL.D.)	No
Germany	May 21, 2024	Frankfurt School of Finance & Management	Doctor of Economics (Dr. rer. pol. h. c.)	No

=== Memberships and fellowships ===
Location	Date	Organization	Position
Massachusetts	1999–2010	National Bureau of Economic Research	Research Associate (Monetary Economics)
Massachusetts	2001–present	American Academy of Arts and Sciences	Member
New York	2002–2010	Economists for Peace and Security	Trustee
New York	2005–present	Council on Foreign Relations	Member
District of Columbia	2009–present	Group of Thirty	Senior Member
Tennessee	2012–present	American Economic Association	Distinguished Fellow
Connecticut	2014–present	Econometric Society	Fellow
District of Columbia	2010–present	National Association for Business Economics	NABE Fellow
England	2016–present	British Academy	Honorary Fellow

=== Awards ===
Location	Date	Organisation	Award
Connecticut	May 26, 1997	Yale Graduate School of Arts and Sciences	Wilbur Cross Medal
District of Columbia	October 11, 2010	National Association for Business Economics	Adam Smith Award
New York	January 22, 2015	Hobart and William Smith Colleges	Elizabeth Blackwell Award
Massachusetts	May 27, 2016	Radcliffe Institute for Advanced Study	Radcliffe Medal
Rhode Island	May 5, 2017	Brown University	The President's Medal
Illinois	November 7, 2017	Institute of Government and Public Affairs	The Paul H. Douglas Award for Ethics in Government: Awarded with Ben Bernanke
California	February 2, 2019	University of California, Santa Cruz	The Foundation Medal
Connecticut	March 20, 2019	Chief Executive Leadership Institute	The Legend in Leadership Award
Massachusetts	September 21, 2019	Brandeis International Business School	Dean's Medal
Missouri	October 10, 2019	Truman Library Institute	Truman Medal for Economic Policy
District of Columbia	March 30, 2023	National Association for Business Economics	The Paul A. Volcker Lifetime Achievement Award for Economic Policy
Pennsylvania	January 3, 2026	American Economic Association	Janet L. Yellen Award for Excellence in Public Service: The inaugural recipient of an award named in her honor

=== Other recognition ===
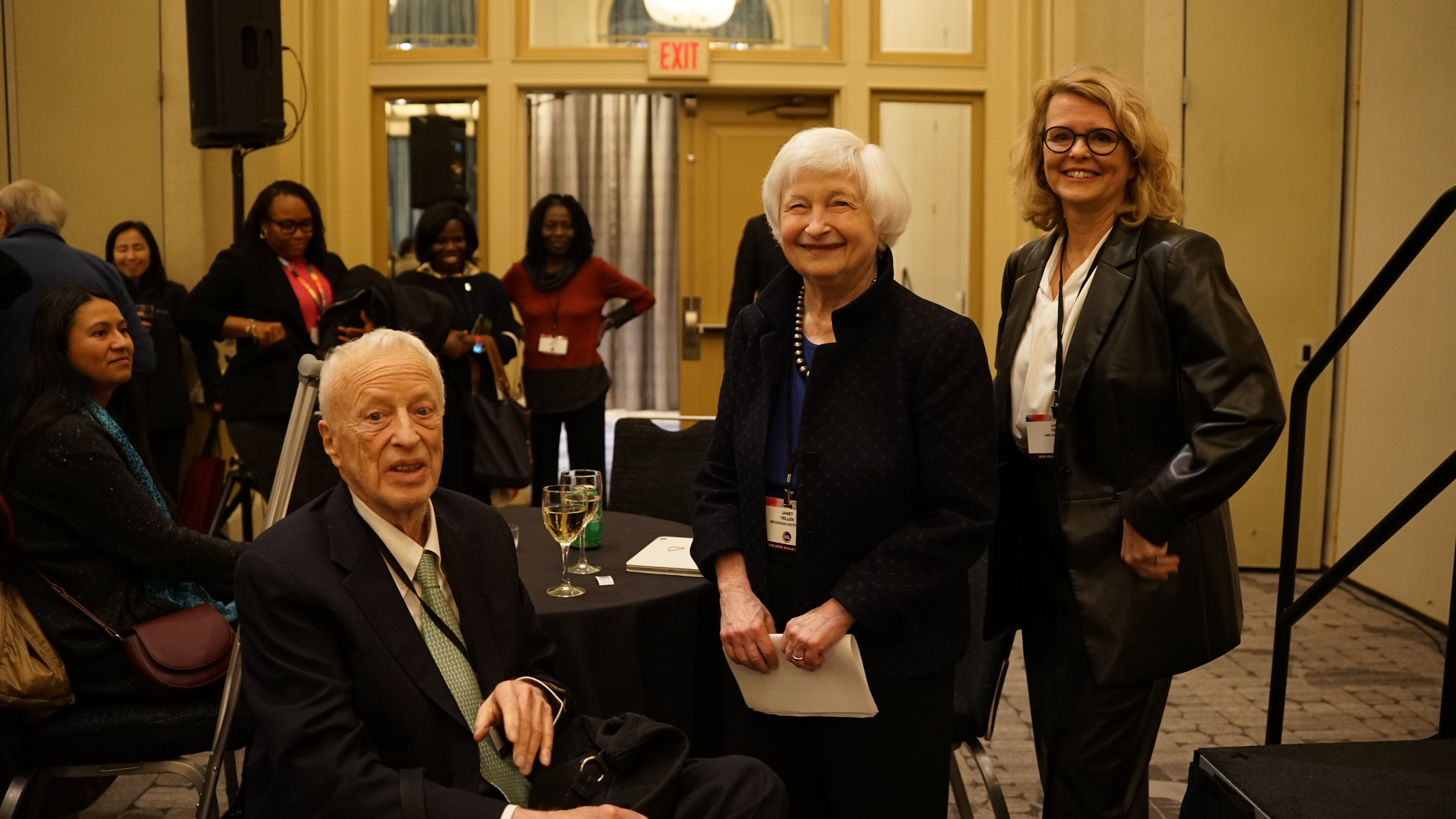
Yellen with her husband George Akerlof and Linda Tesar at the inaugural Janet L. Yellen Prize

- In March 2018, Charles D. Ellis endowed The Janet L. Yellen Chair at the Yale School of Management, which was named after her. Professor Andrew Metrick has been invested as the inaugural Janet L. Yellen Professor of Finance and Management at the School.
- In December 2018, Federal Reserve Board presented an annual Janet L. Yellen Award for Excellence in Community Development to recognize the exemplary work of Federal Reserve System staff, intended to honor former chair Yellen's commitment to public service. Ariel Cisneros of the Federal Reserve Bank of Kansas City has been named the first recipient of the newly created award.
- In October 2025, Barbara Clarke endowed Janet L. Yellen Distinguished Chair in Business at the Brandeis University, which was named after her. Professor Anna Scherbina has been invested as the inaugural Janet L. Yellen Distinguished Professor of Business at the university.
- Yellen has been named one of the 100 most influential people in the world by Time magazine four times. This occurred in the years 2014, 2015, 2017, and 2023. Additionally, she was named a runner-up for Time Person of the Year in 2022.
- Yellen has been ranked on multiple occasions in Forbes magazine's list of the world's 100 most powerful women. She was named the second-most powerful woman in the world in 2014. Forbes also ranked her several times on its list of the world's most powerful people. She was named the sixth-most powerful person in the world in 2014 and 2016.

== Personal life ==
Yellen is married to George Akerlof, an economist who is a university professor at the McCourt School of Public Policy at Georgetown University and Koshland Professor of Economics Emeritus at the University of California, Berkeley, as well as a 2001 Nobel Memorial Prize in Economic Sciences laureate. The couple met in the fall of 1977, became engaged by that December, and married in June 1978, less than a year after meeting.

Their son, Robert Akerlof (born 1981), is a fellow economist. He received a bachelor's summa cum laude in economics and mathematics from Yale University in 2003 and earned his Ph.D. in economics from Harvard University in 2009, where he was a Presidential Scholar. After two years as a postdoc at MIT, and 14 years at the University of Warwick as an assistant and associate professor of economics, in 2024, he became a full professor of economics at the UNSW Business School in Sydney.

Yellen and George Akerlof have often collaborated on research, including topics such as poverty, unemployment and a paper on the costs of out-of-wedlock childbearing. One of their most discussed papers at Berkeley, on why lower wages sometimes lead to lower employment, came from the personal experience of hiring a nanny for the first time. Yellen says Akerlof has been her biggest intellectual influence. Both frequently state that their lone disagreement is that she is a bit more supportive of free trade than he is.

Yellen has an estimated net worth of $20 million, accrued from stock holdings, speaking engagements, and various government and academic positions. Upon taking office as U.S. Treasury Secretary, she divested her shares including those in Pfizer, ConocoPhillips, and AT&T, among others.

Yellen inherited from her mother a collection of postage stamps worth between $15,000 and $50,000. She does not collect them on her own.

== In popular culture ==
"Who's Yellen Now?" is a song by Dessa, a member of the indie hip-hop collective Doomtree and contributor to The Hamilton Mixtape. Marketplace commissioned the song after then-President-elect Biden announced his intention to nominate Yellen as the nation's first female Treasury Secretary and joked that Lin-Manuel Miranda should write a Hamiltonesque musical about her. In addition, The Late Show with Stephen Colbert premiered a parody of Hamilton's opening song about Yellen.

On NBC's sketch comedy show Saturday Night Live (SNL), Yellen was parodied by SNL cast member Kate McKinnon in 2021.

== Selected works ==
=== Books ===
- Akerlof, George A.; Yellen, Janet L., eds. (October 31, 1986). Efficiency Wage Models of the Labor Market. Cambridge University Press. doi:10.1017/cbo9780511559594. ISBN 978-0-521-31284-4.
- Blinder, Alan S.; Yellen, Janet L. (2001). The Fabulous Decade: Macroeconomic Lessons from the 1990s. New York: The Century Foundation Press. ISBN 0-87078-467-6. OCLC 47018413.

=== Articles ===
- Adams, William James; Yellen, Janet L. (August 1976). "Commodity Bundling and the Burden of Monopoly". The Quarterly Journal of Economics. 90 (3): 475–498. doi:10.2307/1886045. JSTOR 1886045.
- Akerlof, George A.; Yellen, J. L. (January 1985). "A Near-Rational Model of the Business Cycle, with Wage and Price Inertia". The Quarterly Journal of Economics. 100: 823–838. doi:10.1093/qje/100.Supplement.823. ISSN 0033-5533.
- Akerlof, George A.; Yellen, Janet L. (May 1990). "The Fair Wage-Effort Hypothesis and Unemployment". The Quarterly Journal of Economics. 105 (2): 255–283. doi:10.2307/2937787. JSTOR 2937787.

== See also ==
- List of female United States Cabinet members
- List of Jewish United States Cabinet members
- List of people who have held multiple United States Cabinet-level positions

Government offices
Preceded by Wayne Angell	Member of the Federal Reserve Board of Governors; 1994–1997	Succeeded by Edward Gramlich
Preceded by Robert Parry	President of the Federal Reserve Bank of San Francisco; 2004–2010	Succeeded by John Williams
Preceded by Mark W. Olson	Member of the Federal Reserve Board of Governors; 2010–2018	Succeeded by Lisa Cook
Preceded by Donald Kohn	Vice Chair of the Federal Reserve; 2010–2014	Succeeded by Stanley Fischer
Preceded by Ben Bernanke	Chair of the Federal Reserve; 2014–2018	Succeeded by Jerome Powell
Political offices
Preceded by Joseph Stiglitz	Chair of the Council of Economic Advisers; 1997–1999	Succeeded by Martin Neil Baily
Preceded by Steven Mnuchin	United States Secretary of the Treasury; 2021–2025	Succeeded by Scott Bessent
Academic offices
Preceded by Ben Bernanke	President of the American Economic Association; 2020–2021	Succeeded by David Card
U.S. order of precedence (ceremonial)
Preceded by Lloyd Austin as Former U.S. Cabinet Member	Order of precedence of the United States as Former U.S. Cabinet Member	Succeeded by Alejandro Mayorkas as Former U.S. Cabinet Member
