= Laurie Mayer =

Laurie Mayer may refer to:

- Laurie Mayer (composer) (born 1961), composer and musician
- Laurie Mayer (newsreader) (born 1945), BBC newsreader

== See also ==
- Laurence Meyer (born 1944), economist
