= J. Dewey Daane =

American economist and banker (1918–2017)

Dewey Daane
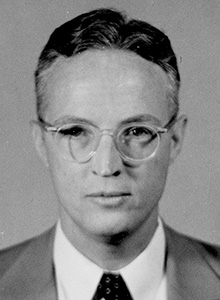

Member of the Federal Reserve Board of Governors
- In office November 29, 1963 – March 8, 1974
- President: Lyndon B. Johnson; Richard Nixon
- Preceded by: George King
- Succeeded by: Henry Wallich

Personal details
- Born: James Dewey Daane; July 6, 1918 Grand Rapids, Michigan, US
- Died: January 3, 2017 (aged 98) Nashville, Tennessee, US
- Political party: Independent
- Education: Duke University (BA); Harvard University (MPA, DPA)

J. Dewey Daane (July 6, 1918 – January 3, 2017) was an American economist and banker who served as a member of the Federal Reserve Board of Governors from 1963 to 1974. After leaving the Fed, Daane was also a chaired professor at Vanderbilt University since 1974.

He received an M.P.A. and D.P.A. from Harvard University. He died on January 3, 2017, at the age of 98.

== Footnotes ==
Government offices
Preceded by George King	Member of the Federal Reserve Board of Governors; 1963–1974	Succeeded by Henry Wallich
