= Frederic Mishkin =

American economist

Rick Mishkin
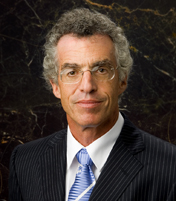

Member of the Federal Reserve Board of Governors
- In office September 5, 2006 – August 31, 2008
- President: George W. Bush
- Preceded by: Roger W. Ferguson Jr.
- Succeeded by: Jerome Powell

Personal details
- Born: Frederic Stanley Mishkin; January 11, 1951 (age 75) New York City, New York, U.S.
- Party: Independent
- Spouse: Sally Hammond
- Children: 2
- Education: Massachusetts Institute of Technology (BS, PhD)

Frederic Stanley "Rick" Mishkin (born January 11, 1951) is an American economist and professor at the Columbia University Graduate School of Business. He served as a member of the Federal Reserve Board of Governors from 2006 to 2008.

== Early life and education ==
Mishkin was born in New York City to Sidney Mishkin and Jeanne Silverstein. His father endowed the Mishkin Gallery at Baruch College of the City University of New York.

He attended the Fieldston School, and later earned both a B.S. (1973) and a Ph.D. (1976) in economics from the Massachusetts Institute of Technology. His doctoral advisor was Stanley Fischer. In 1999, he was awarded an honorary professorship by the People's (Renmin) University of China.

== Career ==
Mishkin has been a full professor at Columbia Business School since 1983. He held the A. Barton Hepburn Professorship of Economics from 1991 to 1999, after which he was appointed Alfred Lerner Professor of Banking and Financial Institutions. He was a research associate at the National Bureau of Economic Research from 1980 to 2006, and a senior fellow at the Federal Deposit Insurance Corporation's Center for Banking Research between 2003 and 2006.

From 1994 to 1997, Mishkin served as Executive Vice President and Director of Research at the Federal Reserve Bank of New York, and was an associate economist of the Federal Open Market Committee. He also edited the bank’s Economic Policy Review and served on its editorial board. Between 1997 and 2006, he worked as an academic consultant and was a member of the economic advisory panel of the Federal Reserve Bank of New York. He has also served as a consultant to the Federal Reserve Board and as a visiting scholar in its Division of International Finance.

Mishkin has worked as a consultant to several international organizations, including the World Bank, the Inter-American Development Bank, and the International Monetary Fund. He has also advised some central banks globally. Additionally, he served on the International Advisory Board of South Korea's Financial Supervisory Service and advised the Institute for Monetary and Economic Research at the Bank of Korea.

In 2006, he co-authored the report Financial Stability in Iceland, commissioned by the Icelandic Chamber of Commerce in response to international media criticism. The report stated that Iceland's economic fundamentals were strong. Mishkin received $124,000 for co-authoring the report.

Iceland experienced a major financial collapse two and a half years later. The 2010 documentary film Inside Job claimed that Mishkin’s curriculum vitae (CV) had listed the report title as Financial Instability in Iceland instead. His CV no longer lists any work related to Iceland. In a 2010 blog post for the Financial Times, he explained his participation in the film. Director Charles H. Ferguson responded to Mishkin’s remarks on the same blog.

Mishkin was confirmed as a member of the Federal Reserve Board of Governors on September 5, 2006, to fill an unexpired term ending January 31, 2014. He resigned from the board effective August 31, 2008, to revise his textbook and return to teaching at Columbia Business School.

== Authorships and publications ==
Mishkin's research focuses on monetary policy and its impact on financial markets and the aggregate economy. He is the author of more than twenty books and has published articles in professional journals and books. Mishkin has served on the editorial boards of economic journals including American Economic Review, Journal of Business and Economic Statistics, the Journal of Applied Econometrics, the Journal of Economic Perspectives, the Journal of Money, Credit and Banking, Macroeconomics and Monetary Economics Abstracts, Journal of International Money and Finance, International Finance, and Finance India.

== Personal life ==
He is married to Sally Hammond, a landscape designer. They have a son and a daughter.

Government offices
Preceded by Roger W. Ferguson Jr.	Member of the Federal Reserve Board of Governors; 2006–2008	Succeeded by Jerome Powell
