= John P. LaWare =

American banker and government official (1928–2004)

John LaWare
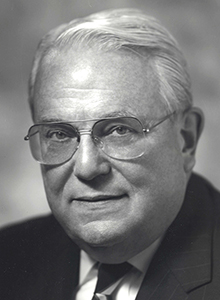

Member of the Federal Reserve Board of Governors
- In office August 15, 1988 – April 30, 1995
- President: Ronald Reagan; George H. W. Bush; Bill Clinton
- Preceded by: Henry Wallich
- Succeeded by: Laurence Meyer

Personal details
- Born: February 20, 1928 Columbus, Wisconsin, U.S.
- Died: December 13, 2004 (aged 76) Brunswick, Georgia, U.S.
- Party: Democratic
- Education: Harvard University (BA); University of Pennsylvania (MA)

John P. LaWare (February 20, 1928 – December 13, 2004) was an American banker who served as a member of the Federal Reserve Board of Governors from 1988 to 1995.

== Early life and education ==
LaWare was a native of Columbus, Wisconsin. He was born on February 20, 1928. After receiving a B.A. in biology from Harvard College in 1950, he earned an M.A. in political science from the University of Pennsylvania in 1951, after which he was in the U.S. Air Force during the Korean War.

== Banking career ==
In 1953, LaWare joined Chemical Bank, where he worked for 25 years, rising to senior vice president of marketing. In 1978, he joined Shawmut Bank in Boston, Massachusetts, as president. Two years later, he became chairman and CEO of both Shawmut Bank in Boston and its holding company, Shawmut Corporation. During his time at Shawmut, he was chairman of the Massachusetts Business Roundtable, chairman of the Massachusetts Bankers Association and Children's Hospital in Boston. He was also a director of the Federal Reserve Bank of Boston.

== Federal Reserve ==
President Reagan nominated LaWare to the Federal Reserve Board in 1988. In spite of the fact that LaWare was a Democrat, Senator William Proxmire (Democrat, Wisconsin) initially opposed his nomination, but eventually he was confirmed by the Senate. He was on the Federal Reserve Board until 1995.

== Honors ==
LaWare received honorary doctors' degrees from Suffolk University and Northeastern University. He was also honored as a Distinguished Citizen by the Boy Scouts of America, the Minuteman Council and the College of Business of Northeastern University. He died in 2004.

Government offices
Preceded by Henry Wallich	Member of the Federal Reserve Board of Governors; 1988–1995	Succeeded by Laurence Meyer
