= Donald Kohn =

American economist (born 1942)

Don Kohn
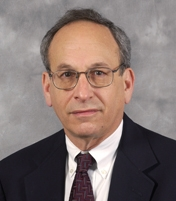

18th Vice Chair of the Federal Reserve
- In office June 23, 2006 – June 23, 2010
- President: George W. Bush; Barack Obama
- Preceded by: Roger Ferguson
- Succeeded by: Janet Yellen

Member of the Federal Reserve Board of Governors
- In office August 5, 2002 – September 1, 2010
- President: George W. Bush; Barack Obama
- Preceded by: Laurence Meyer
- Succeeded by: Sarah Bloom Raskin

Personal details
- Born: Donald Lewis Kohn; November 7, 1942 (age 83) Philadelphia, Pennsylvania, U.S.
- Party: Independent
- Spouse: Gail Kohn
- Children: 2
- Education: College of Wooster (BA); University of Michigan (MA, PhD)

Donald Lewis Kohn (born November 7, 1942) is an American economist who served as the 18th vice chair of the Federal Reserve from 2006 to 2010. Prior to his term as vice chair, Kohn served as a member of the Federal Reserve Board of Governors, taking office in 2002. Having retired after 40 years at the Fed, he currently serves on the Financial Policy Committee for the Bank of England and as a Senior Fellow at the Brookings Institution.

== Early life and family ==
Kohn was born to Jewish family in Philadelphia and raised in Elkins Park, Pennsylvania. He received a B.A. in economics in 1964 from The College of Wooster and a Ph.D. in economics in 1971 from the University of Michigan. Kohn and his wife, Gail, have two children, Laura Kohn and Jeffrey Kohn.

== Career ==
Kohn is a veteran of the Federal Reserve System. Before becoming a member of the Board, he served on its staff as Adviser to the Board for Monetary Policy (2001–02), Secretary of the Federal Open Market Committee (1987–2002), Director of the Division of Monetary Affairs (1987–2001), and Deputy Staff Director for Monetary and Financial Policy (1983–87). He also held several positions in the Board's Division of Research and Statistics—Associate Director (1981–83), Chief of Capital Markets (1978–81), and Economist (1975–78). Dr. Kohn began his career as a Financial Economist at the Federal Reserve Bank of Kansas City (1970–75).

Kohn took office as a member of the Board of Governors of the Federal Reserve on August 5, 2002 for a full term ending January 31, 2016. On May 18, 2006, the White House announced that Kohn had been nominated by President George W. Bush to replace Roger W. Ferguson, Jr. as the new vice chairman of the Federal Reserve System for a four-year term. The United States Senate approved his nomination, and Kohn began serving his four-year term as Vice Chairman of the Board of Governors of the Federal Reserve System on June 23, 2006.

Upon the completion of this term as Vice-Chairman on June 23, 2010, Kohn retired from the Federal Reserve. When Kohn announced his retirement on March 1, 2010, Fed chairman Ben Bernanke said, "The Federal Reserve and the country owe a tremendous debt of gratitude to Don Kohn for his invaluable contributions over 40 years of public service."

He was appointed to the Bank of England's Interim Financial Policy Committee on 17 February 2011. Don is the Senior Economic Strategist at the Potomac Research Group, consulting on the U.S. economy.

== Economic views and honors ==
Kohn has written extensively on issues related to monetary policy and its implementation by the Federal Reserve. These works were published in volumes issued by various organizations, including the Federal Reserve System, the Bank of England, the Reserve Bank of Australia, the Bank of Japan, the Bank of Korea, the National Bureau of Economic Research, and the Brookings Institution.

He was awarded the Distinguished Achievement Award from The Money Marketeers of New York University (2002), the Distinguished Alumni Award from the College of Wooster (1998), and the Honorary Degree, Doctor of Laws, from the College of Wooster (2006).

Government offices
Preceded by Laurence Meyer	Member of the Federal Reserve Board of Governors; 2002–2010	Succeeded by Sarah Bloom Raskin
Preceded by Roger W. Ferguson, Jr.	Vice Chair of the Federal Reserve; 2006–2010	Succeeded by Janet Yellen
