= Henry Wallich =

German–American economist and government official (1914–1988)

Member of the Federal Reserve Board of Governors
- In office March 8, 1974 – December 15, 1986
- President: Richard Nixon; Gerald Ford; Jimmy Carter; Ronald Reagan
- Preceded by: J. Dewey Daane
- Succeeded by: John P. LaWare

Personal details
- Born: Henry Christopher Wallich; June 10, 1914 Berlin, Germany
- Died: September 15, 1988 (aged 74) Washington, D.C., U.S.
- Party: Republican
- Education: Ludwig-Maximilians-Universität München; Oriel College, Oxford; New York University; Harvard University (MA, PhD)

Henry Christopher Wallich (/ˈwɑːlɪk/; June 10, 1914 – September 15, 1988) was a German American economist who served as a member of the Federal Reserve Board of Governors from 1974 to 1986. He previously served as a member of the Council of the Economic Advisers under President Dwight D. Eisenhower. Wallich also held a professorship of economics at Yale University. He was best known as an economic columnist for Newsweek magazine, from 1965 until he joined The Federal Reserve. For a period he wrote one week in three, with Milton Friedman and Paul Samuelson, with their 1967 columns earning the magazine a Gerald Loeb Special Award in 1968.

== Early life ==
Wallich was born in Berlin on June 10, 1914, to Paul and Hildegard Rehrmann Wallich. His father and paternal grandfather were both bankers. Wallich had a brother, Walter, and a sister, Christel.

His family had to flee Germany in 1938, in the aftermath of Kristallnacht. He began 10 years at the Federal Reserve Bank of New York in 1941, becoming chief of its foreign research division. He earned a Ph.D. from Harvard University in 1944, and became an American citizen in the same year.

== Work ==
Wallich interests included the developing country economies in the third world. He became a consultant to officials of Puerto Rico, the Dominican Republic and Cuba in the pre-Castro era. He served on the advisory board of the Arms Control and Disarmament Agency in 1972-73 and was the United States representative on the United Nations Experts Panel on the Economic Consequences of the Arms Race. Before joining the Federal Reserve Board, he was a director of the Phoenix Mutual Life Insurance Company, the United Illuminating Company, the Lionel Edie Capital Fund and the First New Haven National Bank, and other institutions.

He was appointed by President Richard Nixon as a Governor of the Federal Reserve System, in 1974 as one of the Fed's seven Governors. and served until 1986, resigning from poor health. Mr. Wallich's proposal espoused in 1971 with Sidney Weintraub, a liberal economist, for a tax-based incomes policy, or TIP. The plan, to control inflation, required an income-tax surcharge to be levied on companies raising their average wage level above specified inflation-related guide-lines. The Wallich-Weintraub plan never became law. He was the board's main emissary to the Bank for International Settlements, the institution in Basel, Switzerland, that serves the world's central banks.

== Personal life and later years ==
In 1950 he married Mable Inness Brown, an economist from Floral Park, Long Island. They met while both were working at the Federal Reserve Bank of New York. After failing health and an operation on a brain tumour, he died in 1988 at George Washington University Hospital aged 74. He was survived by his wife, Mable, mother Hildegard, and children, Christine Wallich, Anna Wallich and Paul Wallich.

== Works ==
- The Mainsprings of the German Revival (1955)
- The Cost of Freedom, Conservatives and Modern Capitalism, The Case For A Free Economy (1960)

== Awards ==
- 1974 Gerald Loeb Award for Columns/Editorial for "Trust Busting the USA"

== Notes ==
Government offices
Preceded by J. Dewey Daane	Member of the Federal Reserve Board of Governors; 1974–1986	Succeeded by John P. LaWare
