= Roger W. Ferguson Jr. =

American economist, lawyer and businessesman (born 1951)

Roger Ferguson
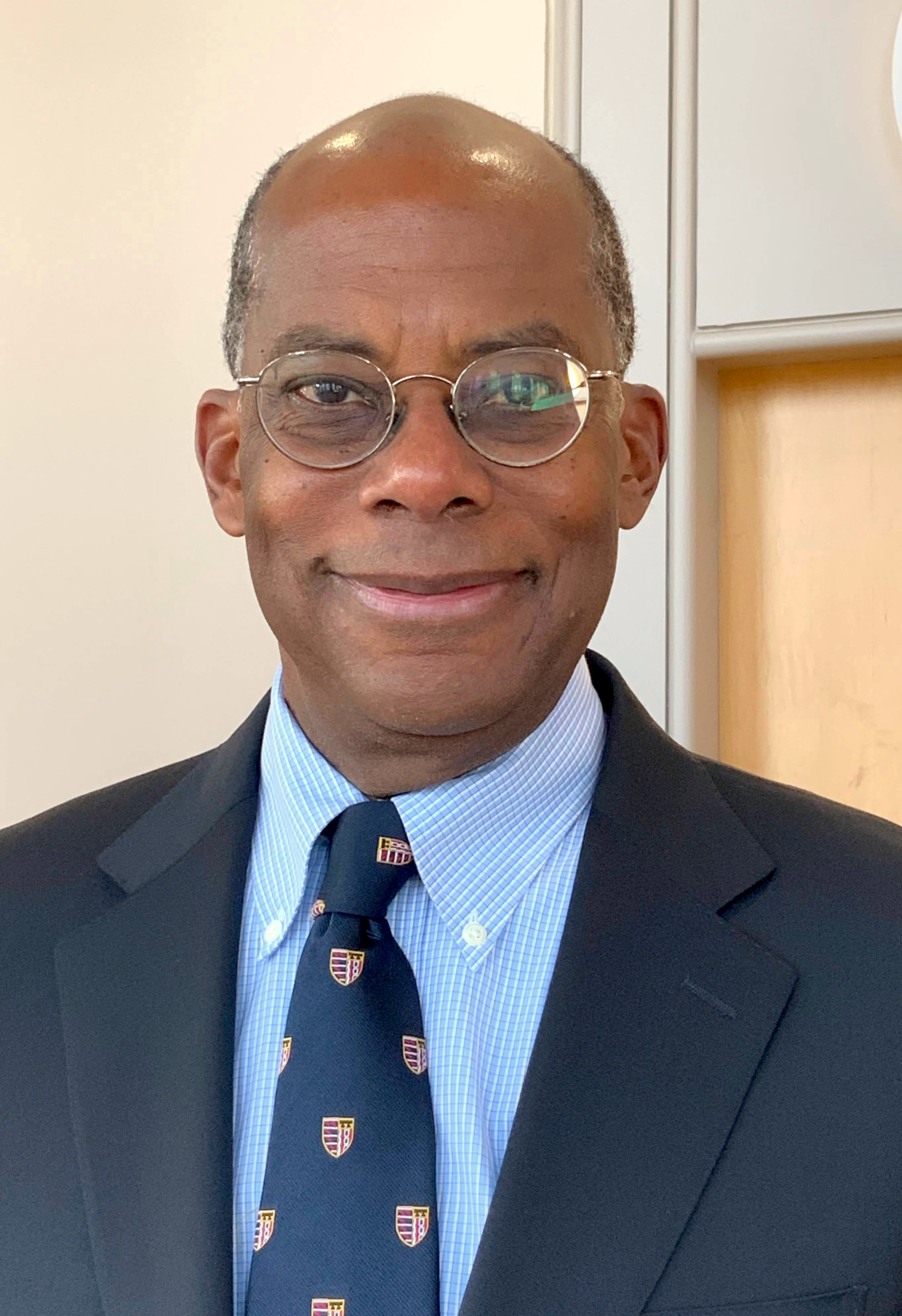

17th Vice Chair of the Federal Reserve
- In office October 5, 1999 – April 28, 2006
- President: Bill Clinton; George W. Bush
- Preceded by: Alice Rivlin
- Succeeded by: Donald Kohn

Member of the Federal Reserve Board of Governors
- In office November 5, 1997 – April 28, 2006
- President: Bill Clinton; George W. Bush
- Preceded by: Lawrence Lindsey
- Succeeded by: Frederic Mishkin

Personal details
- Born: October 28, 1951 (age 74) Washington, D.C., U.S.
- Party: Democratic
- Spouse: Annette Nazareth
- Education: Harvard University (BA, JD, PhD); Pembroke College, Cambridge

Roger W. Ferguson Jr. (born October 28, 1951) is an American economist, attorney and corporate executive who served as the 17th vice chairman of the Federal Reserve from 1999 to 2006. Prior to his term as vice chairman, Ferguson served as a member of the Federal Reserve Board of Governors, taking office in 1997. He was the first African-American vice chairman. After leaving the Fed, he served as president and CEO of the Teachers Insurance and Annuity Association of America (TIAA) from 2008 to 2021. Ferguson has also been appointed to the board of directors of several companies including Alphabet.

== Education ==
Ferguson received a B.A. in economics magna cum laude in 1973, a J.D. cum laude in 1979, and a Ph.D. in economics in 1981, all from Harvard University. From 1973 to 1974, he attended Pembroke College at Cambridge University on a Frank Knox Memorial Fellowship. In 2004 Ferguson was elected to an Honorary Fellowship there. In addition, he has honorary degrees from Lincoln College (Illinois), Webster University, Washington and Jefferson College, Michigan State University, Worcester Polytechnic Institute, St. Lawrence University, University of Maryland, Baltimore County, Georgetown University, Metropolitan College of New York, Wabash College, Colby College, Lincoln University (Pennsylvania), Rensselaer Polytechnic Institute, Stevens Institute of Technology, Sewanee: The University of the South, American University, Hofstra University, Dartmouth College, University of Michigan and University of San Francisco.

In 2016, Ferguson received the Harvard Medal, awarded annually by the Harvard Alumni Association for service to Harvard.

In 2019, Ferguson received the Harvard Centennial Medal. The Centennial Medal is the highest honor bestowed by the Graduate School of Arts and Sciences and is awarded for "contributions to society as they have emerged from one’s graduate education at Harvard". The citation presented with the Medal reviewed Ferguson's achievements and featured reflections from Douglas Elmendorf, Drew Faust and Larry Summers.

== Chairmanship reports in 2005 ==
On October 11, 2005, Lawrence Kudlow stated his belief that Alan Greenspan was pushing Ferguson's name to the Bush administration for the appointment of the Federal Reserve chairmanship. As a supply-side economist, Kudlow said he was worried that Ferguson would follow a neo-Keynesian policy and would oppose the Bush administration's economic policy. On October 25, 2005, The Washington Post reported that senior members at the Federal Reserve, including Alan Greenspan, were encouraging the Bush administration to appoint Ferguson to the Federal Reserve chairmanship. The position eventually went to Ben Bernanke.

== Post-Fed career ==
In April 2008, Ferguson became president and chief executive officer of the Teachers Insurance and Annuity Association – College Retirement Equities Fund (TIAA). In November 2020, he announced that he would retire at the end of March 2021.

On June 29, 2016, Ferguson became a member of Board of Directors of Alphabet Inc.

On May 10, 2021, Ferguson assumed the position of Steven A. Tananbaum Distinguished Fellow for International Economics at The Council on Foreign Relations.

In August 2022, he joined the tech incubator Red Cell Partners as Chief Investment Officer.

In February 2023, he was named a member of the McKinsey & Company External Advisory Group.

== Publications, references and appearances ==
Ferguson has co-authored, edited or led study groups or commissions that have produced numerous publications, including monographs, occasional papers, study group reports and commission reports. These works cover a wide range of topics in financial regulation, financial stability, financial institution culture and governance. and current macroeconomic topics. Among Ferguson's published works are:

- "International Financial Stability", Geneva Reports World Economy 9 (2007)
- "Banking, Financial and Regulatory Reform" (2007)
- "The Structure of Financial Supervision: Approaches and Challenges in a Global Marketplace" (2008)
- "Enhancing Financial Stability and Resilience: Macroprudential Policies, Tools and Systems for the Future" (2010)
- "Regulatory Reforms and Remaining Challenges" (2011)
- "Aging and the Macroeconomy: Long-term Implications of an Older Population" (2012)
- "Toward Effective Governance of Financial Institutions" (2012)
- "A New Paradigm: Financial Institutions Boards and Supervisors" (2013)
- "Banking Conduct and Culture: A Call for Sustained and Comprehensive Reform" (2015)
- "The Future of Undergraduate Education, The Future of America" (2017)

Additionally, Ferguson's leadership style and leadership of TIAA have been highlighted in several management books, including "The Extraordinary Power of Leader Humility" by Marilyn Gist and "The Harvard Business Review Leader's Handbook: Make an Impact, Inspire Your Organization, and Get to the Next Level" by Ron Ashkenas and Brook Manville.

== Achievements ==
Ferguson was the only Federal Reserve Governor in Washington, D.C., during the September 11 attacks in 2001. He was responsible for leading the Federal Reserve's initial response to the terrorist attacks and was praised for his expert handling of the crisis.

While at the Fed, Ferguson led two working groups to improve the transparency of Federal Open Market Committee (FOMC) decisions and the clarity of FOMC communication. These resulted in the release of a statement at the end of each FOMC meeting, explaining the rationale for the interest rate decision and including an assessment of the risks facing the economy.

While at the Fed, Ferguson served as Chairman of the Group of Ten Working Party on Financial Sector Consolidation. The Working Party released its final report on January 25, 2001.

Alan Greenspan has called Ferguson "one of the most effective Vice Chairmen in the history of the Federal Reserve."

Ferguson proposed the idea of a journal dedicated to central banking theory and practice. The resulting International Journal of Central Banking was announced in 2004 and first published in 2005, with two objectives: to disseminate widely the best policy-relevant research on central banking and to promote communication among central banks. The IJCB has more than 50 sponsoring institutions.

With three co-authors, in November 2007 Ferguson published "International Financial Stability", Geneva Report No. 9, dealing with challenges to global financial stability and including observations regarding the liquidity crisis of 2007.

Ferguson served as the vice chairman of the Group of 30 study group that published "The Structure of Financial Supervision: Approaches and Challenges in a Global Marketplace". The study of the regulatory structure of 17 jurisdictions was released on October 6, 2008.

Ferguson served as chairman of the Group of 30 study group that published "Enhancing Financial Stability and Resilience: Macroprudential Policy, Tools and Systems for the Future". The study called on public officials to empower systemic regulators with new tools to enhance the stability and resilience of the global financial system and potentially lessen the severity of future crises. The study was released on October 10, 2010.

Between 2008 and 2012, Ferguson served as economic advisor to President Obama, initially as a member of the President-elect's Transition Economic Advisory Board and subsequently as a member of the President's Economic Recovery Advisory Board and the President's Commission on Jobs and Competitiveness

Ferguson served as chairman of the Group of 30 study group that published "Toward Effective Governance of Financial Institutions". The study, which has been translated into three languages. made several concrete and practical recommendations to enhance governance of financial institutions, including recommendations for management, boards of directors, supervisors and shareholders. The study was released on April 12, 2012.

Ferguson served as co-chairman of the Group of 30 study group that published "Banking Conduct and Culture: A Call for Sustained and Comprehensive Reform". Following two previous reports, the study expands on the role of conduct and culture in the governance of the world's largest financial institutions. The report identifies shortcomings but also good practice in promoting a strong banking culture, making a series of recommendations that can be drawn upon by leaders as they seek to address culture in their firms. The study was released July, 2015.

Between 2010 and 2012, Ferguson co-chaired a National Research Council panel on the Long-Run Macro-Economic Effects of the Aging U.S. Population. The final report was issued in September, 2012, under the title, "Aging and the Macroeconomy: Long-Term Implications of an Older Population".

Ferguson was elected to the American Academy of Arts and Sciences in 2010.

Ferguson was elected to the American Philosophical Society in 2016.

Ferguson and his wife established an endowment support the director position at the Anacostia Community Museum in November 2022.

Government offices
Preceded by Lawrence Lindsey	Member of the Federal Reserve Board of Governors; 1997–2006	Succeeded by Frederic Mishkin
Preceded by Alice Rivlin	Vice Chair of the Federal Reserve; 1999–2006	Succeeded by Donald Kohn
