= Laurence Meyer =

American economist and government official (born 1944)

Larry Meyer
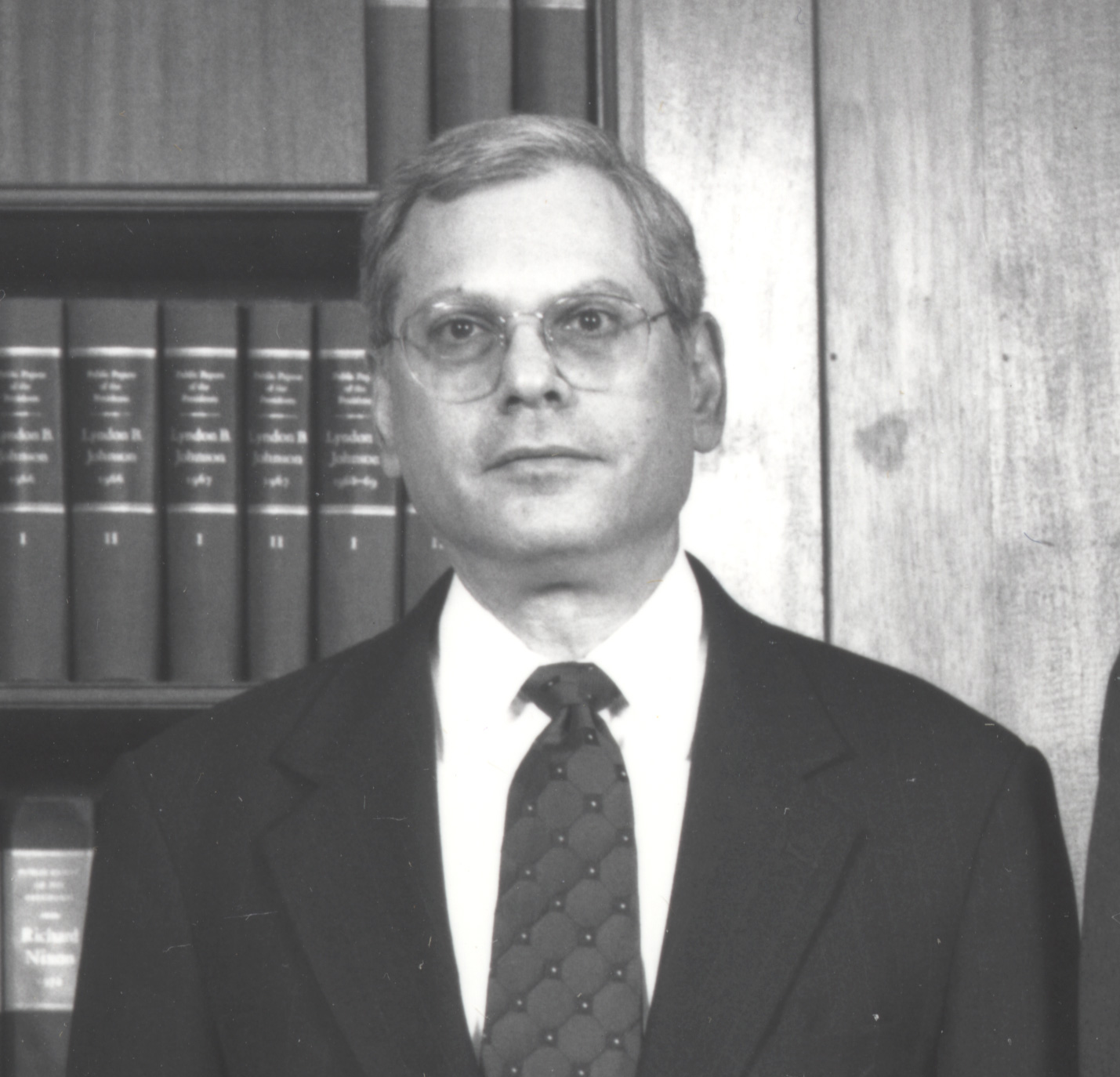

Member of the Federal Reserve Board of Governors
- In office June 24, 1996 – January 31, 2002
- President: Bill Clinton; George W. Bush
- Preceded by: John P. LaWare
- Succeeded by: Donald Kohn

Personal details
- Born: March 8, 1944 (age 81); New York City, New York, U.S.
- Political party: Democratic
- Education: Yale University (BA); Massachusetts Institute of Technology (MA, PhD)

Academic career
- Field: Macroeconomics
- School or tradition: Neo-Keynesian economics
- Influences: Hyman Minsky

Laurence Meyer (born March 8, 1944) is an American economist who served as a member of the Federal Reserve Board of Governors from 1996 to 2002.

Meyer received a B.A. (magna cum laude) from Yale University in 1965 and a Ph.D. in economics from the Massachusetts Institute of Technology in 1970. He then taught at Washington University in St. Louis for 27 years.

Meyer also ran an economic consulting firm, Laurence H. Meyer and Associates, with two former students. He won several economic forecasting awards while running the company. After he moved to the US Fed, he sold his interest in the firm and it was renamed Macroeconomic Advisers.

In 1996, he and Alice Rivlin were nominated to the Fed by US President Bill Clinton. At the Fed, Meyer was one of the governors most ready to raise interest rates, because he believed that the economy was operating near full capacity, and especially that the employment rate was near the non-accelerating inflation rate of unemployment, or the rate that would cause inflation. Alan Greenspan, the chairman at that time, was one of the leaders of the idea that improved productivity would allow the Fed to keep interest rates low without causing inflation.

After leaving the Fed, Meyer became a Distinguished Scholar at the Center for Strategic and International Studies. He also founded Monetary Policy Analytics, Inc. dba LH Meyer

== Publications ==
- Meyer, Laurence (2004). A Term at the Fed : An Insider's View. Collins. ISBN 0-06-054270-5.

Government offices
Preceded by John P. LaWare	Member of the Federal Reserve Board of Governors; 1996–2002	Succeeded by Donald Kohn
