= Lael Brainard =

American economist (born 1962)

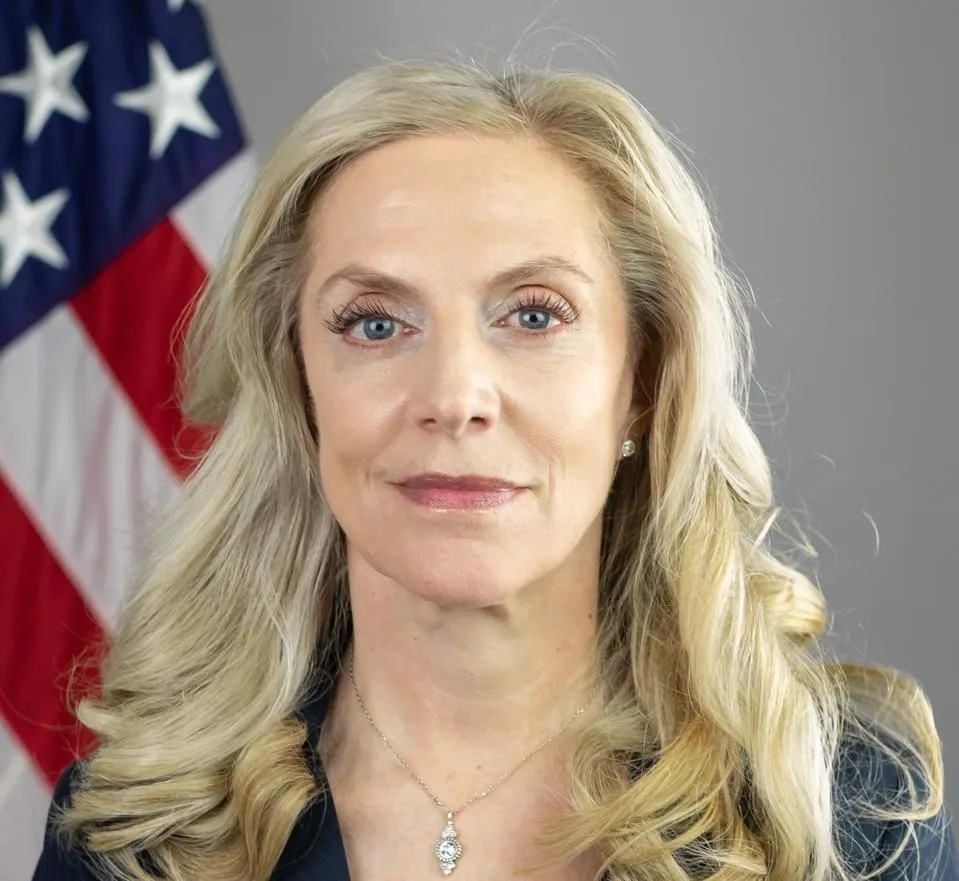
- Official portrait, 2023

Director of the National Economic Council
- In office February 21, 2023 – January 20, 2025
- President: Joe Biden
- Preceded by: Brian Deese
- Succeeded by: Kevin Hassett

22nd Vice Chair of the Federal Reserve
- In office May 23, 2022 – February 18, 2023
- President: Joe Biden
- Preceded by: Richard Clarida
- Succeeded by: Philip Jefferson

Member of the Federal Reserve Board of Governors
- In office June 16, 2014 – February 18, 2023
- President: Barack Obama; Donald Trump; Joe Biden
- Preceded by: Elizabeth Ashburn Duke
- Succeeded by: Adriana Kugler

Under Secretary of the Treasury for International Affairs
- In office April 20, 2010 – November 8, 2013
- President: Barack Obama
- Preceded by: Dave McCormick
- Succeeded by: Nathan Sheets

Personal details
- Born: January 1, 1962 (age 64) Hamburg, West Germany
- Party: Democratic
- Spouse: Kurt M. Campbell (m. 1998)
- Education: Wesleyan University (BA); Harvard University (MA, PhD)

Lael Brainard (born January 1, 1962) is an American economist who served as the 14th director of the National Economic Council from 2023 to 2025. She previously served as the 22nd vice chair of the Federal Reserve between May 2022 and February 2023. Prior to her term as vice chair, Brainard served as a member of the Federal Reserve Board of Governors, taking office in 2014. Before her appointment to the Federal Reserve, she served as the under secretary of the treasury for international affairs from 2010 to 2013.

Brainard was nominated by Barack Obama to serve as the Under Secretary of the Treasury for International Affairs at the Department of the Treasury on March 23, 2009. She was confirmed to the position by a 78–19 vote in the U.S. Senate on April 20, 2010, and was sworn in on the same day. She tendered her resignation on November 8, 2013, in advance of her nomination by Obama to serve on the Fed board.

President Biden nominated Brainard to serve as Vice Chair of the Federal Reserve on November 22, 2021, succeeding Richard Clarida in the role. On April 26, 2022, her nomination as Federal Reserve Vice Chair was confirmed by the U.S. Senate. She was sworn in on May 23, 2022. In February 2023, Biden announced Brainard as Brian Deese's successor as Director of the National Economic Council (NEC). She resigned her positions as Federal Reserve governor and Vice Chair on February 18, 2023. As NEC director, Brainard additionally served as chair of the White House Competition Council.

== Early life and education ==
Lael Brainard, daughter of the U.S. foreign-service officer and diplomat Alfred Brainard, grew up in West Germany and later Poland in the period before the Revolutions of 1989 and the Fall of the Berlin Wall. She graduated with university honors from Wesleyan University with a Bachelor of Arts degree from the College of Social Studies. Brainard received masters and doctoral degrees in economics from Harvard University, where she was a National Science Foundation Fellow.

She is the recipient of a White House Fellowship and a Council on Foreign Relations International Affairs Fellowship. She received the Alexander Hamilton Award for her service at the Department of the Treasury and was awarded the Harvard GSAS Centennial Medal and the New York Association of Business Economics William F. Butler Award in 2019.

== Career ==
=== Private sector ===
Brainard started her career at McKinsey & Company advising corporate clients on strategic challenges.

Brainard was an assistant and associate professor of Applied Economics at the MIT Sloan School of Management from 1990 to 1996 where her publications made important contributions on the relationship between offshore production, trade, and jobs; the measurement of structural and cyclical unemployment in the U.S. economy; and strategic trade policy.

Brainard was a senior fellow at the Brookings Institution from 2001 to 2009 and Vice President and Director of the Global Economy and Development Program from 2006 to 2009.

=== White House ===
Beginning in 1997 Brainard served as deputy national economic advisor and deputy assistant to the president during the Clinton administration. In this role, she was the White House staff coordinator for the Asia-Pacific Economic Cooperation (APEC) Leaders Meeting in Vancouver and Manila; responsible for the President's three-year review of NAFTA; and for preparing the way for China's entry into the WTO. She was also responsible for the G7/G8 Jobs Conferences in the U.K. and France, and took part in President Clinton's visits to China, Latin America, the U.K., and the Summit of the Americas held in Miami.

As deputy director of the National Economic Council, she helped build a new White House organization to address global economic challenges such as the Asian financial crisis and China's accession to the World Trade Organization. As the U.S. Sherpa to the G8, she helped shape the 2000 G8 summit that, for the first time, included leaders of the poorest nations and laid the foundations for the Global Fund to Fight AIDS, Tuberculosis and Malaria.

=== Treasury ===
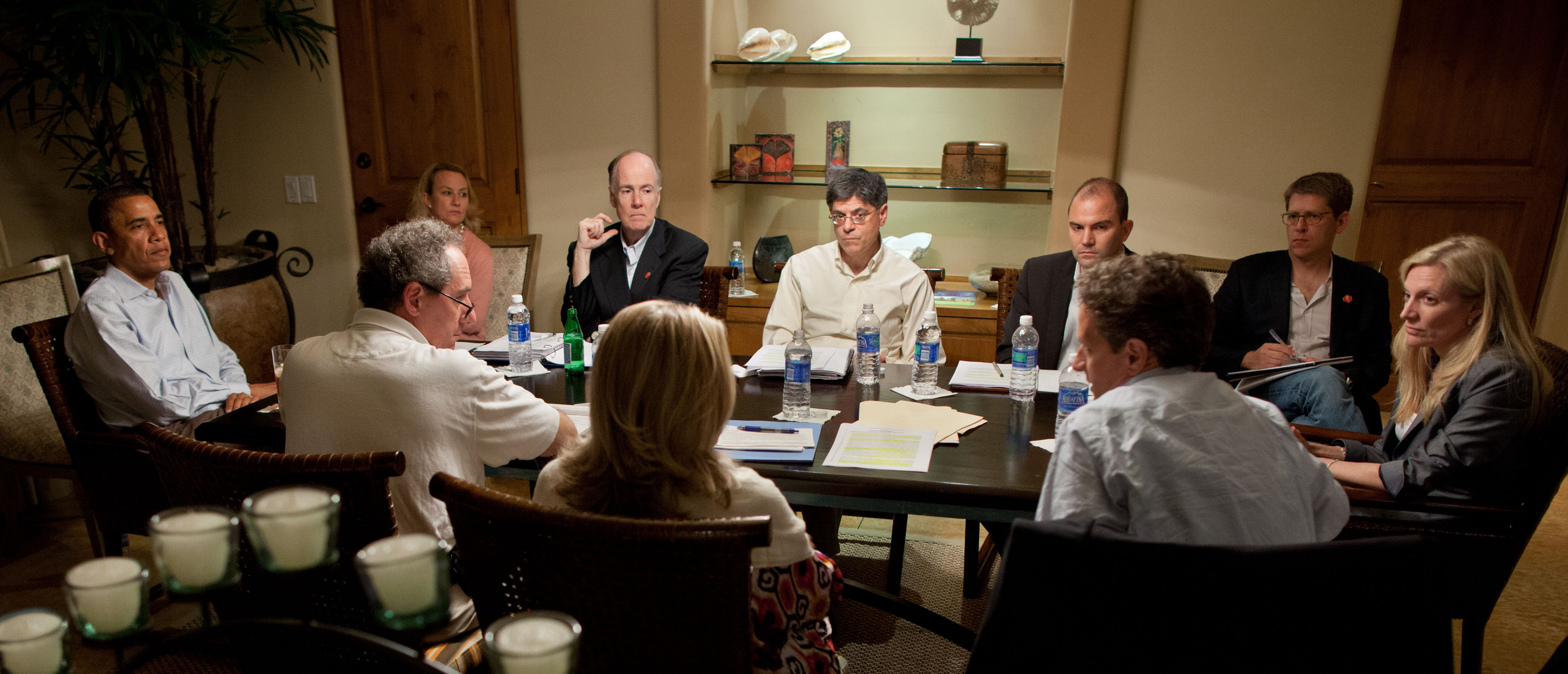
Brainard, far right, at a briefing for President Obama before the 2012 G20 Los Cabos summit

On March 23, 2009, President Obama nominated Brainard to serve as Under Secretary of the Treasury for International Affairs. Reuters News Service reported on December 23, 2009, that the Senate Finance Committee had approved Brainard to become the "Treasury Department's top global diplomat, a job that would give her a key role in the bid to push China toward a flexible currency". The Senate confirmed her in a 78–19 vote on April 20, 2010. Brainard managed the Office of International Affairs at the Treasury Department with responsibilities including the euro area crisis and currency relations with China. In this role, she exerted pressure on China to allow the forces of the free market to guide its currency. She also pressured Europe to follow a stronger economic rescue plan during the sovereign-debt crisis.

During this time, she was the U.S. representative to the G-20 Finance Deputies and G-7 Deputies and was a member of the Financial Stability Board. She received the Alexander Hamilton Award for her service. She left her post in the U.S. Treasury in November 2013.

=== Federal Reserve Board ===
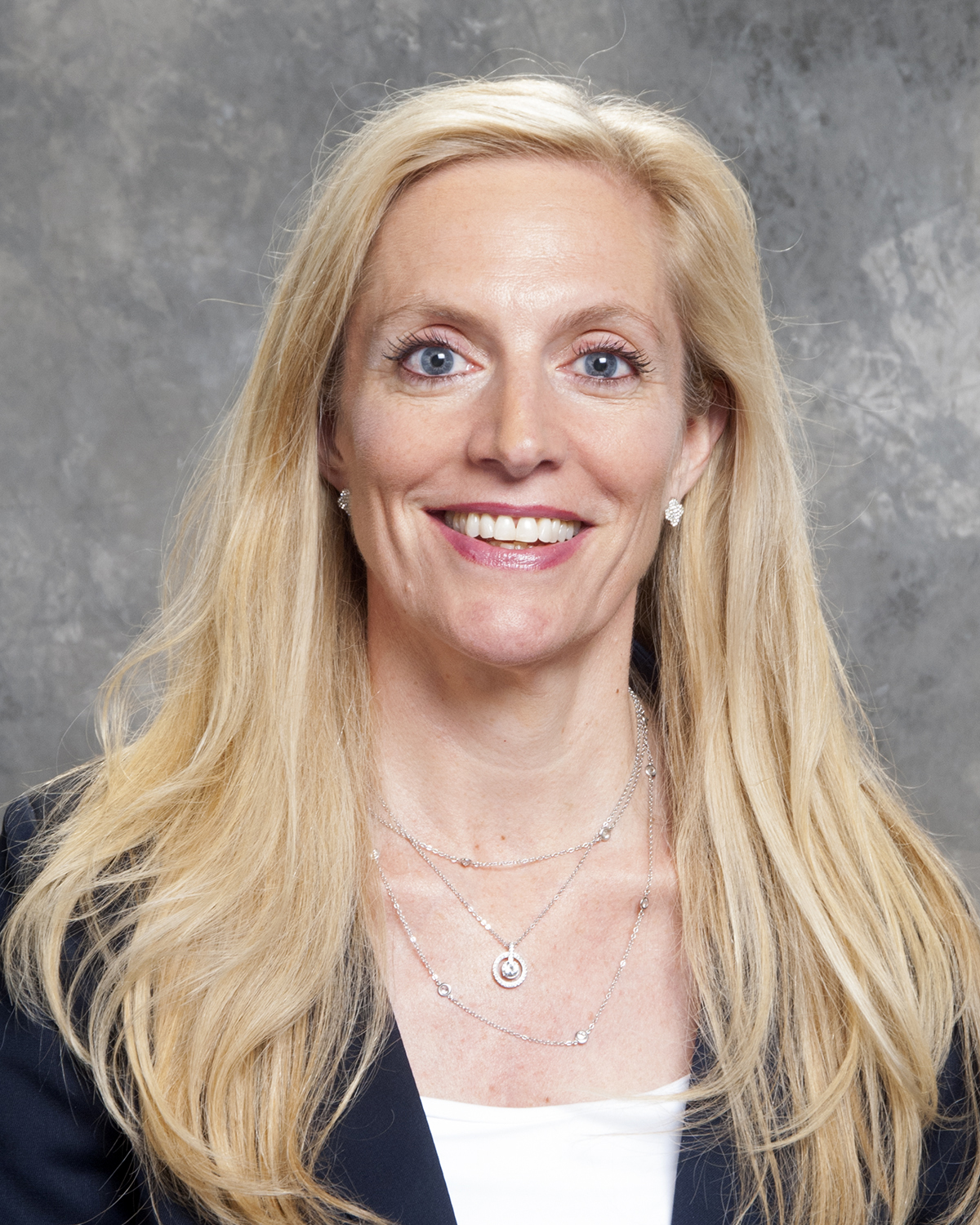
Brainard's Federal Reserve Board portrait

Brainard was nominated to the Federal Reserve Board of Governors by President Barack Obama in January 2014. She was confirmed by the Senate by a vote of 61–31 on June 12, 2014, and began her term on June 16, 2014. Brainard served as Administrative Governor, Chair of the Committee on Financial Stability, the Committee on Federal Reserve Bank Affairs, the Committee on Consumer and Community Affairs, the Committee on Payments, Clearing and Settlements, and the Subcommittee on Smaller Regional and Community Banking Organizations.

==== Vice Chair of the Federal Reserve ====
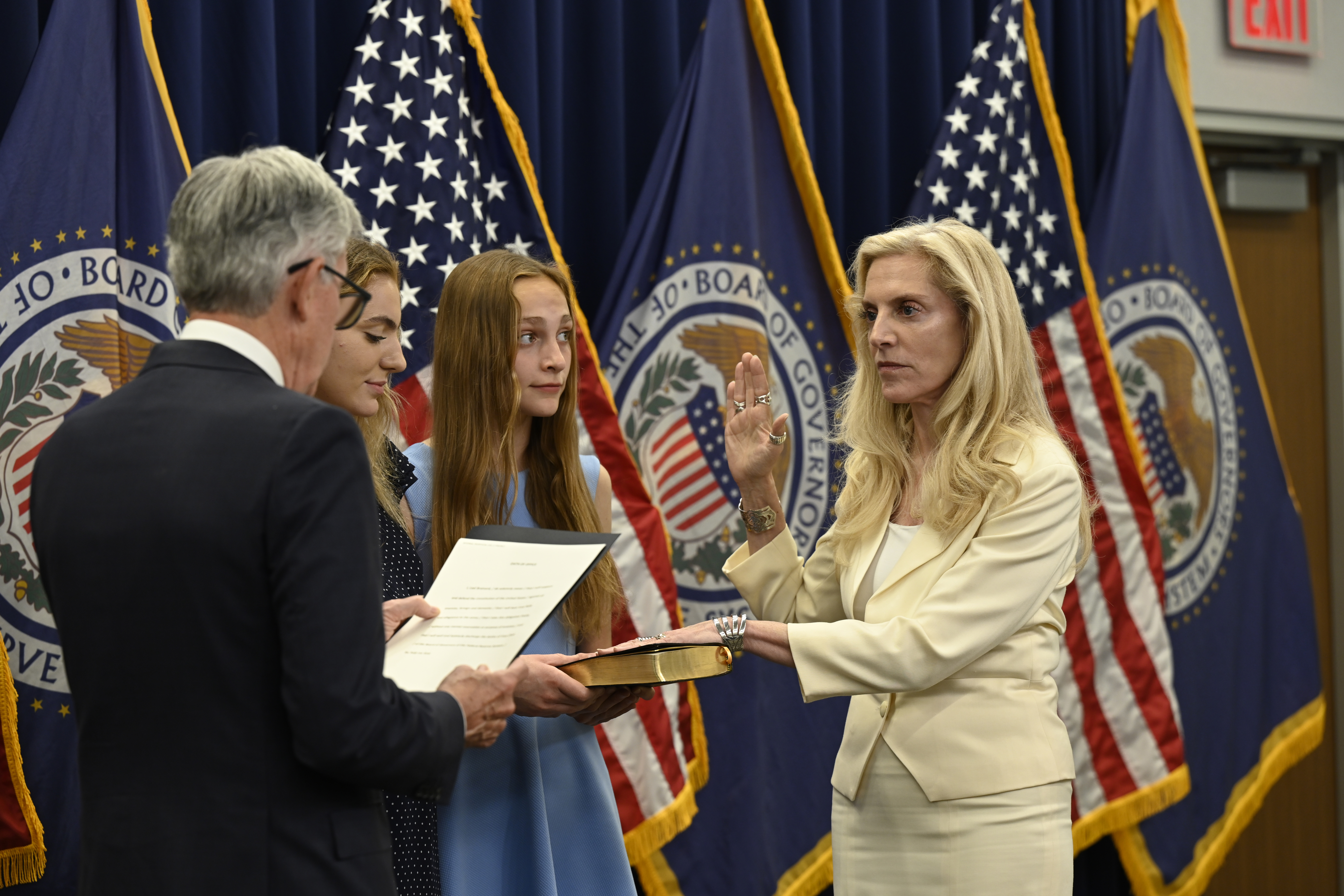
Brainard sworn in as vice chair of the Federal Reserve by Jerome Powell in May 2022

On November 22, 2021, President Joe Biden nominated Brainard to be the vice-chair of the Federal Reserve. Her initial nomination was returned to President Biden on January 3, 2022, due to it expiring at the end of the year. President Biden renominated her the following day.

Hearings were held on Brainard's nomination before the Senate Banking Committee on January 13, 2022. The committee favorably reported her nomination to the Senate floor on March 16, 2022, in a 16–8 vote. On April 25, 2022, the United States Senate invoked cloture on her nomination by a 54–40 vote. On April 26, 2022, her nomination was confirmed by the Senate by a 52–43 vote, with all Democrats present and seven Republicans voting in favor of her confirmation. She became just the third woman to serve as Fed's Vice Chair, following Alice Rivlin and Janet Yellen.

=== National Economic Council ===
In February 2023, Biden selected Brainard as Director of the National Economic Council (NEC), replacing Brian Deese. She is the second woman to serve as NEC Director, following Laura Tyson. As NEC director, Brainard also served at the helm of the White House Competition Council, a position she also succeeded Deese in. Dr. Brainard, along with Jake Sullivan and Steve Ricchetti, acted as an intermediary for Biden administration officials and lawmakers who sought access to the President according to an investigative report by the Wall Street Journal.

== Publications ==
Brainard is co‑editor of Climate Change and Global Poverty: A Billion Lives in the Balance (2009); co-editor of Too Poor For Peace? (2007); co-editor of Offshoring White Collar Work (2006); editor of Transforming the Development Landscape: the Role of the Private Sector (2006) and Security by Other Means: Foreign Assistance, Global Poverty and American Leadership (2006); and co-author of The Other War: Global Poverty and the Millennium Challenge Corporation (2004).

Political offices
Preceded by David McCormick	Under Secretary of the Treasury for International Affairs; 2010–2013	Succeeded by Nathan Sheets
Preceded by Brian Deese	Director of the National Economic Council; 2023–2025	Succeeded by Kevin Hassett
Government offices
Preceded by Elizabeth Ashburn Duke	Member of the Federal Reserve Board of Governors; 2014–2023	Succeeded by Adriana Kugler
Preceded by Richard Clarida	Vice Chair of the Federal Reserve; 2022–2023	Succeeded by Philip Jefferson
