= Richard Clarida =

American economist (born 1957)

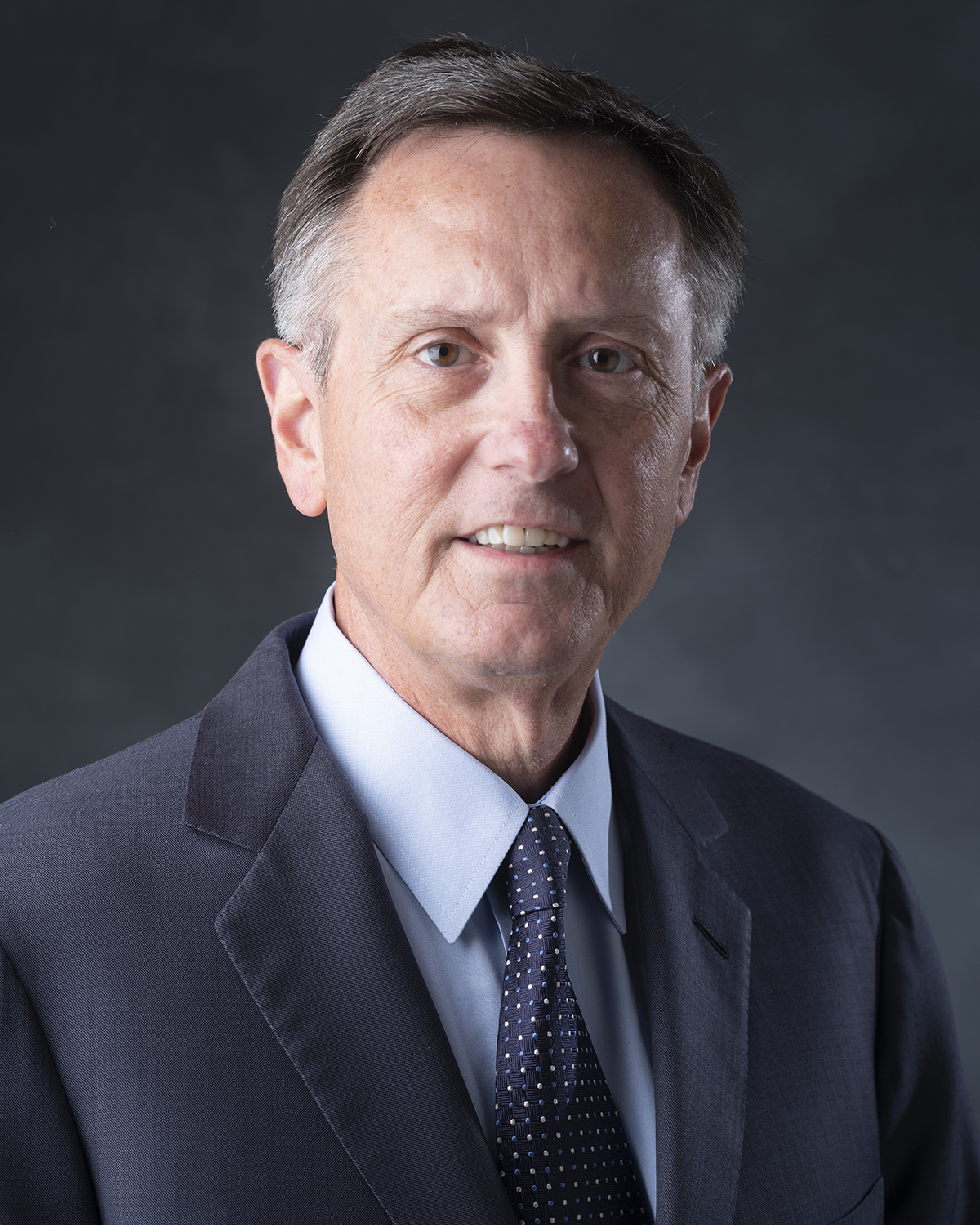
- Official portrait, 2018

21st Vice Chair of the Federal Reserve
- In office September 17, 2018 – January 14, 2022
- Nominated by: Donald Trump
- Preceded by: Stanley Fischer
- Succeeded by: Lael Brainard

Member of the Federal Reserve Board of Governors
- In office September 17, 2018 – January 14, 2022
- Nominated by: Donald Trump
- Preceded by: Daniel Tarullo
- Succeeded by: Philip Jefferson

Assistant Secretary of the Treasury for Economic Policy
- In office February 7, 2002 – May 16, 2003
- President: George W. Bush
- Preceded by: David Wilcox
- Succeeded by: Mark Warshawsky

Personal details
- Born: May 18, 1957 (age 68) Herrin, Illinois, U.S.
- Party: Republican
- Education: University of Illinois, Urbana-Champaign (BS); Harvard University (MA, PhD)

Richard Harris Clarida (born May 18, 1957) is an American economist who served as the 21st vice chair of the Federal Reserve from 2018 to 2022. Clarida resigned his post on January 14, 2022, to return from public service leave to teach at Columbia University for the spring term of 2022. He is the C. Lowell Harriss Professor of Economics and International Affairs at Columbia University and, from 2006 until September 2018 and from October 2022 to the present, a Global Strategic Advisor for PIMCO. He is notable for his contributions to dynamic stochastic general equilibrium theory and international monetary economics. He is a former assistant secretary of the treasury for economic policy and is a recipient of the Treasury Medal. He also was a proponent of the theory that inflation was transitory during the COVID-19 pandemic.

== Education ==
Clarida received his Bachelor of Science degree in economics from the University of Illinois with Bronze Tablet honors, and his Master of Arts and Doctor of Philosophy degrees from Harvard University. In October 2018 he received the College of Liberal Arts and Sciences Alumni Achievement Award from the University of Illinois.

== Academic career and research contributions ==
Since 1988, Clarida has taught in the economics and international affairs programs at Columbia University, where he is the C. Lowell Harriss Professor of Economics. From 1997 until 2001, Clarida served as chairman of the Department of Economics at Columbia University. Earlier in his career, he had been a member of the Cowles Foundation at Yale University.

Clarida's research centers on dynamic stochastic general equilibrium modeling, a branch of applied general equilibrium theory that is influential in contemporary macroeconomics and optimal monetary policy, especially through the lens of time-series analysis. His studies with Jordi Galí and Mark Gertler suggest that monetary policy in many countries today resembles a forward-looking Taylor rule, whereas the policy makers of the 1970s failed to follow such a forward-looking Taylor rule.

Clarida has published numerous frequently cited articles in leading academic journals on monetary policy, exchange rates, interest rates, and international capital flows. He is frequently invited to present his research to the world's leading central banks, including the Federal Reserve, the ECB, the Bank of England, and the Bank of Japan. He has written on the monetary policy implications of the low-inflation period created by the 2008 financial crisis. He also introduced in 2014 the concept of a "new neutral" for American monetary policy which predicted a substantial decline in r*, the interest rate consistent with full employment and stable inflation. Whereas before the crisis r* was thought to be above 4 percent, Clarida wrote in 2014 that r* was now closer to 2 percent than to 4 percent.

== Other professional achievements ==
Clarida served as the Assistant Secretary of the United States Treasury for Economic Policy, a position that required confirmation by the United States Senate. In that position, he served as chief economic advisor to two Treasury Secretaries, Paul O'Neill and John W. Snow, advising them on economic policy issues, including U.S. and global economic prospects, international capital flows, corporate governance, and the maturity structure of U.S. debt. In May 2003, Snow awarded Clarida the Treasury Medal "in recognition of his outstanding service".

Clarida has served as a consultant to several prominent financial firms, including the Global Foreign Exchange Group at Credit Suisse First Boston and Grossman Asset Management. From 2006 to 2018, he was Global Strategic Advisor with PIMCO and in 2015 was named managing director with the firm. Clarida returned to Pimco as managing director and Global Economic Advisor in October 2022. He is a member of the Council on Foreign Relations. Clarida was director of the NBER Project on and editor of G7 Current Account Imbalances: Sustainability and Adjustment. From 2004 to 2018 he served as co-editor of the NBER International Macroeconomics Annual.

In March 2024, the Museum of American Finance honored Clarida with its Whitehead Award for Distinguished Public Service and Financial Leadership; the museum cited his "impactful government service and insightful economic leadership."

== Federal Reserve ==
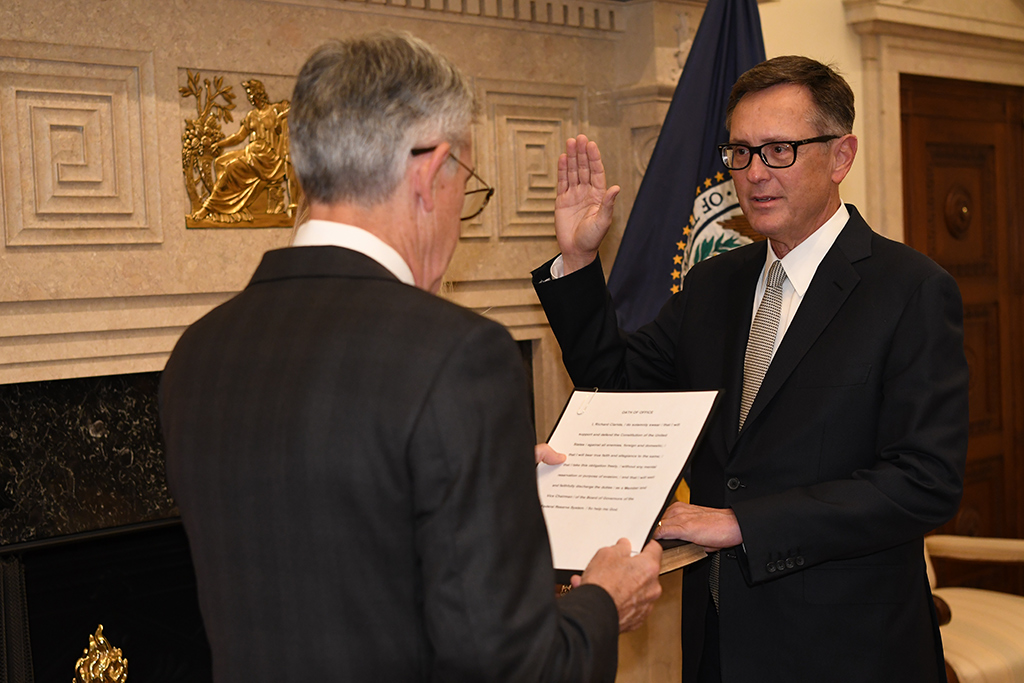
Clarida sworn in as Vice Chair of the Federal Reserve in 2018

On April 24, 2018, Clarida was officially nominated by President Donald Trump to succeed Stanley Fischer as Vice Chair of the Federal Reserve. On August 28, 2018, the United States Senate voted to confirm Clarida by a margin of 69–26. He assumed office on September 17, 2018.

=== Controversial trading ===
On February 27, 2020, one day before Fed Chair Jerome Powell issued a statement regarding the economic response to the COVID-19 pandemic, Clarida traded between $1 million and $5 million out of a bond fund into the equity fund PIMCO StocksPlus. A Fed spokesman responded to Reuters: "Vice Chair Clarida's financial disclosure for 2020 shows transactions that represent a pre-planned rebalancing to his accounts, similar to a rebalancing he did and reported in April 2019." On October 4, 2021, Senator Elizabeth Warren requested the Securities and Exchange Commission investigate whether Clarida violated insider trading rules and to look into his "ethically questionable transactions". When a corrected disclosure revealed that Clarida had sold the same stock fund just three days before his purchase, The New York Times wrote: "the rapid move out of stocks and then back in makes it look less like a planned, long-term financial maneuver and more like a response to market conditions." On January 10, 2022, Clarida announced he would resign his post on January 14, two weeks before the expiration of his term. The announcement from Clarida did not mention the alleged controversial trading activities. In July 2022, Clarida was cleared of wrongdoing after an investigation from the Fed's Inspector General.

== Personal life ==
Clarida grew up in Herrin, Illinois. In 1989 he married Polly Morgan Barry.

In 2016 he released Time No Changes, a 13-track album featuring his own music, lyrics and vocals.

Political offices
Preceded by David Wilcox	Assistant Secretary of the Treasury for Economic Policy; 2002–2003	Succeeded by Mark Warshawsky
Government offices
Preceded by Daniel Tarullo	Member of the Federal Reserve Board of Governors; 2018–2022	Succeeded by Philip Jefferson
Preceded by Stanley Fischer	Vice Chair of the Federal Reserve; 2018–2022	Succeeded by Lael Brainard
