= Philip Jefferson =

American economist

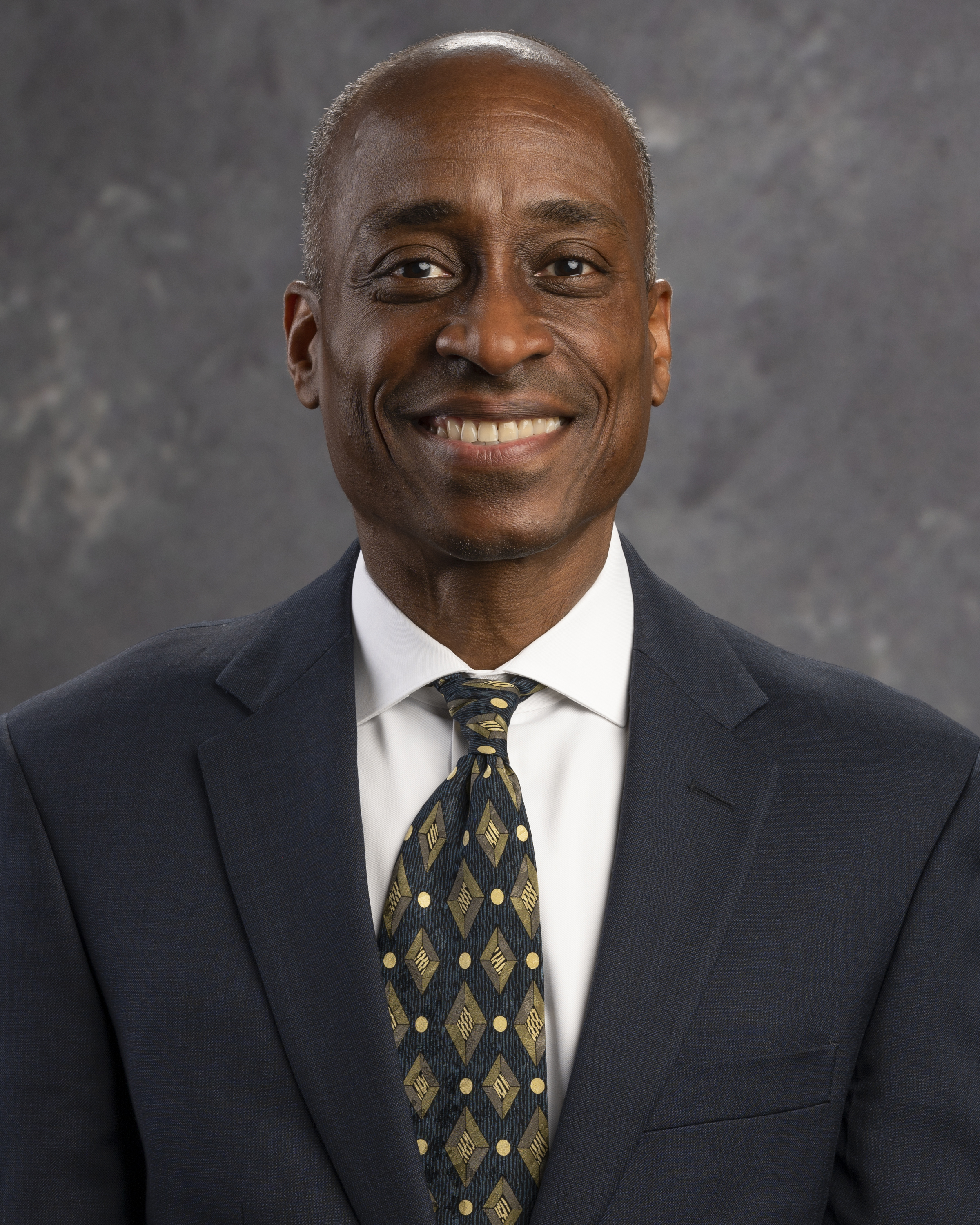
- Official portrait, 2022

23rd Vice Chair of the Federal Reserve
- Incumbent
- Assumed office September 13, 2023
- President: Joe Biden; Donald Trump
- Preceded by: Lael Brainard

Member of the Federal Reserve Board of Governors
- Incumbent
- Assumed office May 23, 2022
- Appointed by: Joe Biden
- Preceded by: Richard Clarida

Personal details
- Born: Philip Nathan Jefferson; 1961 or 1962 (age 64–65) Washington, D.C., U.S.
- Children: 2
- Education: Vassar College (AB); University of Virginia (MA, PhD)

Philip Nathan Jefferson (born 1961/1962) is an American economist who has been serving as 23rd vice chair of the Federal Reserve since September 2023. He has been a member of the Federal Reserve Board of Governors since 2022. He was nominated for the position by President Joe Biden in January 2022, and was confirmed by the Senate in May 2022. Upon taking office, he became the fourth Black man to serve on the board.

Prior to serving on the board, Jefferson worked at Davidson College as a Vice President for Academic Affairs, Dean of Faculty, and Professor of Economics. He was also a professor at both Columbia University and Swarthmore College, and formerly served as a research economist at the Federal Reserve.

== Early life and education ==
Jefferson was born and raised in the Kingman Park neighborhood of Washington, D.C. He attended Vassar College, spending his junior year of college at the London School of Economics and the following summer as a participant in the American Economic Association pipeline program. He completed a doctoral degree from the University of Virginia in 1990.

== Academic career ==
After completing his PhD, Jefferson worked as assistant professor at Columbia University, a visiting professor at the University of California at Berkeley, and as an economist at the Board of Governors of the Federal Reserve System. In 1997, he joined the faculty of Swarthmore College, where he taught courses on econometrics, macroeconomics, and poverty and inequality and became Centennial Professor of Economics.

He was the 2005 president of the National Economic Association. He has been a trustee of Vassar College since 2002, and served on the Swarthmore Borough Council from 2008 to 2012.

In 2019, he became Vice President for Academic Affairs and Dean of Faculty at Davidson College.

== Federal Reserve ==
=== Nomination ===
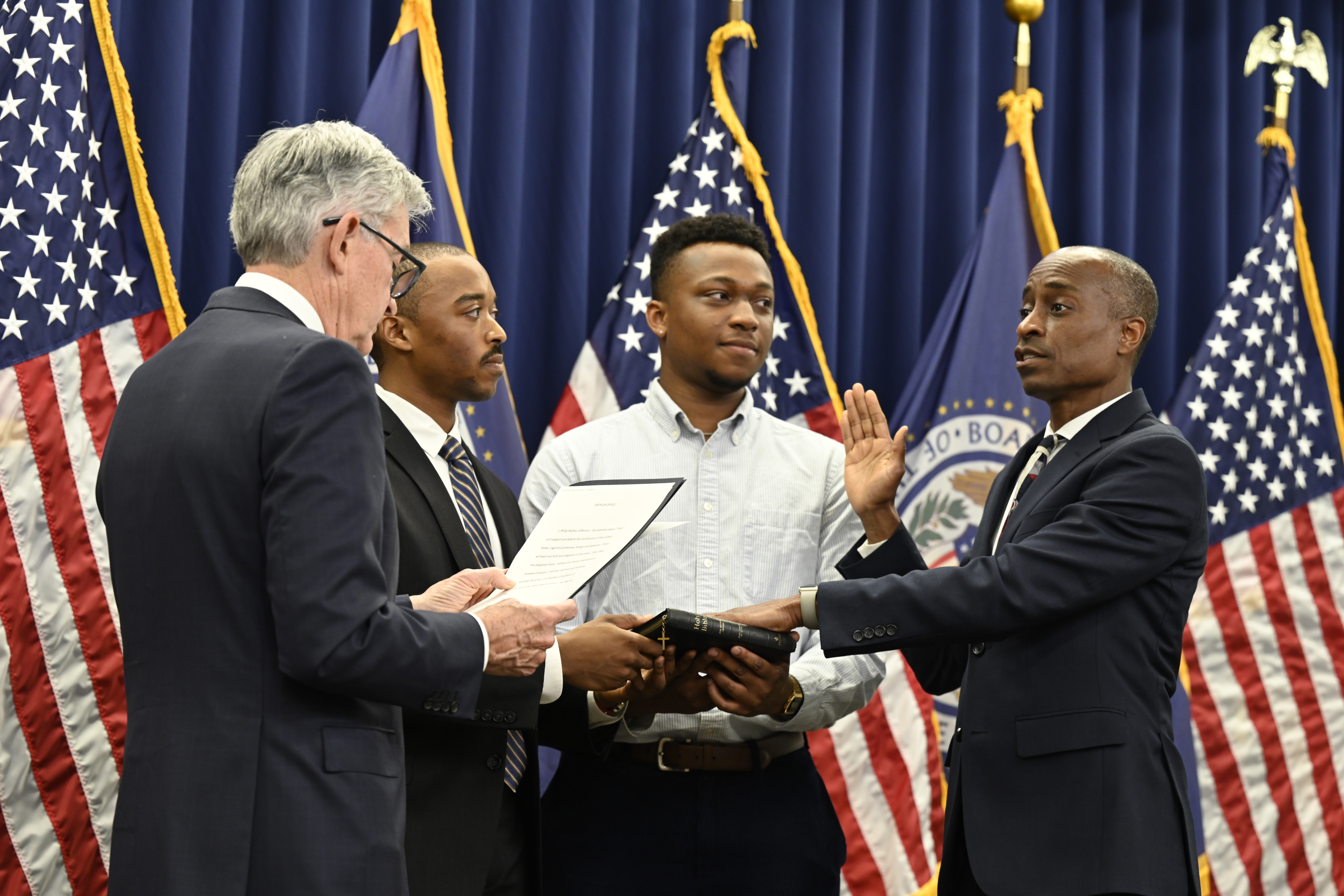
Jefferson sworn in as a member of the Federal Reserve Board of Governors by Jerome Powell in May 2022

On January 14, 2022, President Biden nominated Jefferson to be a member of the Federal Reserve board of governors. Hearings were held before the Senate Banking Committee on Jefferson's nomination on February 3, 2022. The committee favorably reported his nomination on March 16, 2022, by a 24–0 vote. The United States Senate confirmed his nomination by a 91–7 vote.

In May 2023, Jefferson was nominated to serve as Vice Chair of the Federal Reserve, the board's second-highest position. On September 6, 2023, He was confirmed by the Senate as vice chair by a 88–10 vote.

== Selected works ==
- Jefferson, Philip N. Poverty: A Very Short Introduction. Oxford University Press, 2018.
- Jefferson, Philip N., ed. The Oxford handbook of the economics of poverty. Oxford University Press on Demand, 2012.
- Jefferson, Philip N., and Frederic L. Pryor. "On the geography of hate." Economics Letters 65, no. 3 (1999): 389–395.
- Jefferson, Philip N. "Does monetary policy affect relative educational unemployment rates?." American Economic Review 95, no. 2 (2005): 76–82.
- Jefferson, Philip N. "Seigniorage payments for use of the dollar: 1977–1995." Economics Letters 58, no. 2 (1998): 225–230.
- Jefferson, Philip N. "Educational attainment and the cyclical sensitivity of employment." Journal of Business & Economic Statistics 26, no. 4 (2008): 526–535.

Government offices
Preceded by Richard Clarida	Member of the Federal Reserve Board of Governors; 2022–present	Incumbent
Preceded by Lael Brainard	Vice Chair of the Federal Reserve; 2023–present	Incumbent
