= Brian Deese =

American business executive and government official (born 1978)

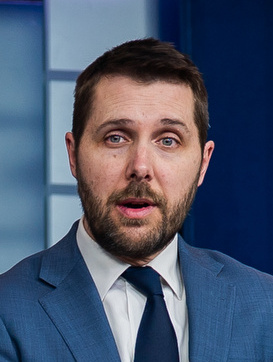
- Deese in 2022

Director of the National Economic Council
- In office January 20, 2021 – February 21, 2023
- President: Joe Biden
- Preceded by: Larry Kudlow
- Succeeded by: Lael Brainard

Senior Advisor to the President
- In office February 23, 2015 – January 20, 2017
- President: Barack Obama
- Preceded by: Pete Rouse
- Succeeded by: Jared Kushner; Stephen Miller

Director of the Office of Management and Budget
- Acting
- In office June 9, 2014 – July 28, 2014
- President: Barack Obama
- Preceded by: Sylvia Mathews Burwell
- Succeeded by: Shaun Donovan

Deputy Director of the Office of Management and Budget
- In office June 27, 2013 – February 13, 2015
- President: Barack Obama
- Preceded by: Heather Higginbottom
- Succeeded by: Russell Vought

Personal details
- Born: Brian Christopher Deese; February 17, 1978 (age 48) Belmont, Massachusetts, U.S.
- Party: Democratic
- Spouse: Kara Arsenault (m. 2007)
- Education: Middlebury College (BA); Yale University (JD)

Brian Christopher Deese (born February 17, 1978) is an American economic and political advisor who was the 13th director of the National Economic Council, serving under President Joe Biden.

He previously served as a senior advisor to President Barack Obama. Earlier in the Obama administration, Deese served as the deputy director and acting director of the Office of Management and Budget. Deese also served as deputy director, and later director, of the National Economic Council. Deese was the Global Head of Sustainable Investing at BlackRock, and is currently the CEO of Foundry-Logic.

== Early life and education ==
Deese was born in Belmont, Massachusetts. He earned a Bachelor of Arts degree in political science from Middlebury College in 2000 and a Juris Doctor from Yale Law School in 2009. In 2002, Deese was named a finalist for the Rhodes Scholarship, though he was not ultimately selected.

== Career ==
Deese worked as a junior fellow at the Carnegie Endowment for International Peace and as a research assistant at the Center for Global Development, hired by founder Nancy Birdsall, according to The New York Times, where he co-authored the book Delivering on Debt Relief. Later he worked as a senior policy analyst for economic policy at the Center for American Progress, under Gene Sperling.

=== Clinton and Obama 2008 presidential campaigns ===
After the Center for American Progress, Deese joined Hillary Clinton's 2008 presidential campaign as her economic policy director. After Clinton was defeated in the primaries, Deese went to work as an economic advisor to the Barack Obama 2008 presidential campaign.

Following the 2008 presidential election, he served as a member of the Economic Policy Working Group for the presidential transition.

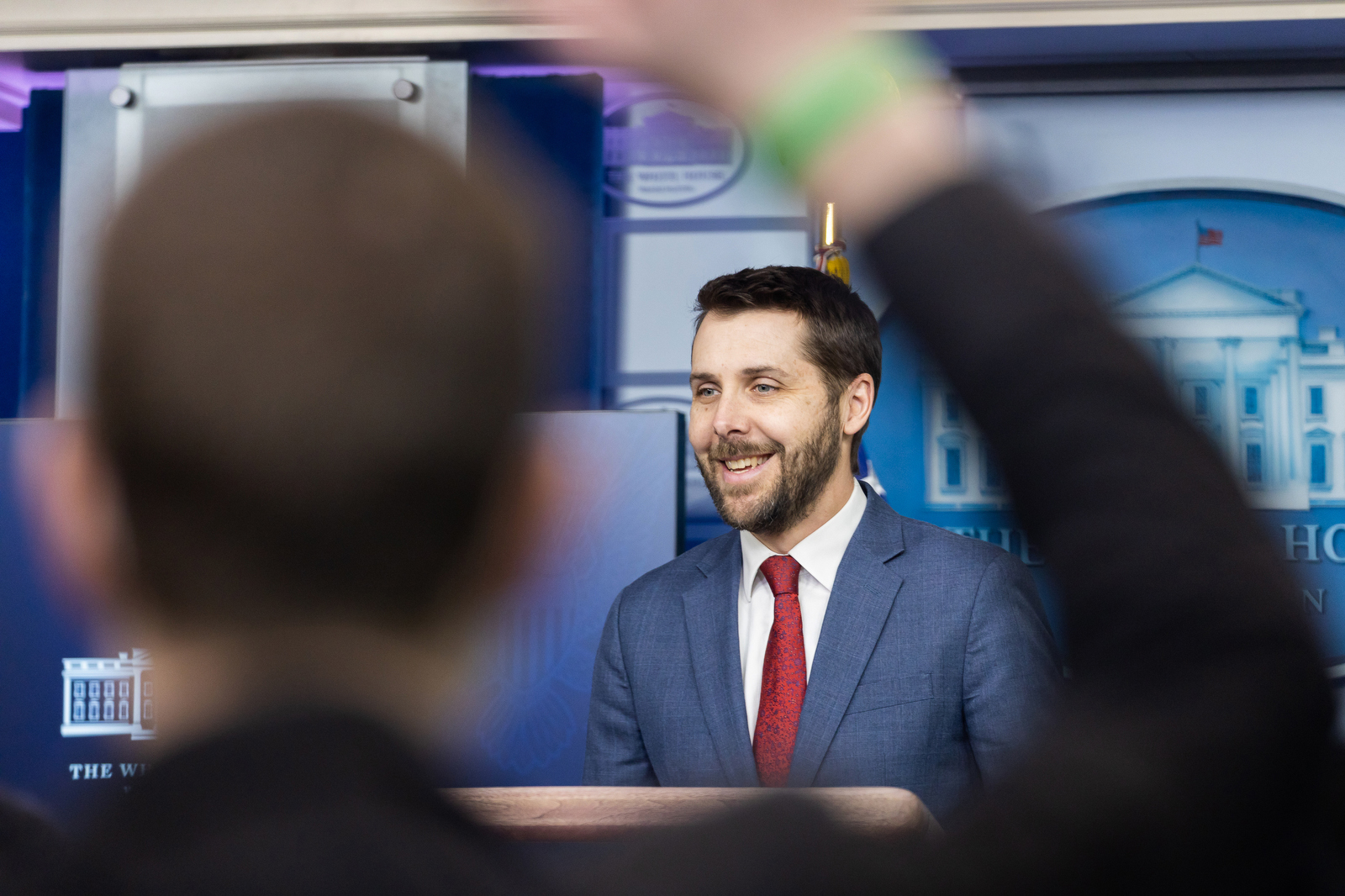
In the James S. Brady Press Briefing Room of the White House, National Economic Council Director Brian Deese participates in a briefing Friday, January 22, 2021.

=== Obama administration ===
==== National Economic Council ====
At the start of the Obama presidency, Deese was appointed as a special assistant to the president for economic policy, serving in the National Economic Council (NEC). According to The New York Times, he emerged as "one of the most influential voices" on the auto industry, and specifically the Chrysler and GM bailout. Deese argued against the government letting Chrysler liquidate based on a concern around the impact on industrial communities across the mid-west.

In 2011, Deese was named deputy director of the NEC. In this role, he coordinated policy development for the White House on taxes, financial regulation, housing, clean energy, manufacturing, and the automotive industry. According to The New Republic, he was among Washington's "most powerful, least famous people".

==== Office of Management and Budget ====
Deese was named deputy director of the Office of Management and Budget in the summer of 2013. He briefly served as the acting director in summer 2014, between the departure of Sylvia Mathews Burwell and the appointment of Shaun Donovan.

==== Senior Advisor to the President ====
Following the departure of John Podesta, Deese took over his brief on climate and energy. Unlike Podesta, who served as Counselor to the President, Deese was promoted to the position of Senior Advisor to the President. In this position, Deese played an influential role in negotiating the Paris Climate Agreement in December 2015 working to secure climate agreements with China, India, Brazil, and other countries. Deese also chaired the Major Economies Forum on Energy and Climate in 2015 and 2016. Deese spearheaded the administration's effort to ratify the Paris Agreement and to reach a global agreement to phase down hydrofluorocarbons (HFCs) through the Kigali Amendment to the Montreal Protocol. Deese also oversaw the Obama administration's efforts to protect more land and water than any previous president, including the largest protected marine monument in the world. In November that year, President Obama explained that Deese "engineered the Paris Agreement, the [Hydrofluorocarbons] Agreement, the Aviation Agreement, [and] may have helped save the planet."

Along with Katie Beirne Fallon, Deese helped to negotiate the 2015 Bipartisan Budget Act, which replaced the budget sequestration and increased federal spending by $80 billion over two years. In February 2016, the President tapped Deese to oversee the Supreme Court nomination process, which led to the President's nomination of Chief Judge Merrick Garland to the Supreme Court on March 16, 2016.

=== BlackRock ===
As Global Head of Sustainable Investing from October 2017 until December 2020, Deese led BlackRock's Sustainable Investing Team which "is focused on identifying drivers of long-term return associated with environmental, social and governance issues." In an interview with The Weather Channel, Deese was asked about BlackRock's "heavy investments" in the fossil fuel industry. Deese said that BlackRock's role is to provide clients with "more choices and more options" in investments and "this is not just about excluding entire industries or entire classes of companies, but it’s also about getting to understand, again, which of these companies is better positioned for the transition."

During this time his salary was at least $2.3 million, with the possibility that through BlackRock's restricted stock plan, Deese could have made an additional $2.4 million.

=== Biden administration ===
On December 3, 2020, President-elect Biden appointed Deese as Assistant to the President and Director of the National Economic Council. In this role, Deese coordinates international and domestic economic policy for the administration. Deese has been a principal architect of the Biden economic agenda, including the American Rescue Plan, the Bipartisan Infrastructure Law, the CHIPS and Science Act, and the Inflation Reduction Act.

At the NEC, Deese was the first and last person Biden consulted on economic issues and was a driving force behind the president's domestic policy legacy. According to Biden, "Brian has a unique ability to translate complex policy challenges into concrete actions that improve the lives of American people." Deese is also credited with assembling the most diverse staff in terms of race and gender in the council's history.

Deese served as a central figure in congressional negotiations leading up to the passage of the Bipartisan Infrastructure Law. Between the spring and fall of 2021, Deese, Steve Ricchetti, and Louisa Terrell were frequent visitors to Capitol Hill, brokering policy conversations and building a coalition of support among Senate Democrats and Republicans.

In April 2022, Deese laid out the case behind the administration's pursuit of a modern industrial strategy, stating: “The question should move from ‘why should we pursue an industrial strategy?’ to ‘how do we pursue one successfully?’” In October 2022, Deese described a modern American industrial strategy as "the best antidote to [the] risk of lower productivity and lower economic capacity in the years ahead," citing the need for strategic, long-term investments in high-return sectors, where public capital helps reduce price pressures, taps into growing global demand, and increases the country's export competitiveness. Deese worked closely with Secretary Gina Raimondo to design and advocate for the CHIPS and Science Act, viewing it as an essential component to the President's industrial strategy. Upon passage, Deese was directed by President Biden to co-chair the new law's 16-member implementation council.

Deese also served as President Biden's primary policy negotiator for key climate, health, and tax reform measures passed in the Inflation Reduction Act. Deese was particularly involved in landing the clean energy and climate provisions, visiting West Virginia with Senator Manchin in March 2022. After going zip-lining with the senator near the New River Gorge, Deese took to Twitter to extoll the state. "Coal and energy communities helped make America what it is, the strongest economy in the world and the global leader of democracy," Deese wrote. "Nobody should forget that, and President Biden certainly doesn't." Deese later participated in the final bill negotiations, conducted in secret, between Senators Manchin and Schumer in July 2022. Environmentalist Fred Krupp described Deese as "indispensable in crafting and negotiating the most important climate law in U.S. history." Beyond IRA passage, Deese developed a reputation for weaving climate action into the fabric of White House economic policymaking.

As NEC director, Deese prioritized competition policy as a way to counter decades of growing corporate concentration in the economy. He pushed to establish the first-ever White House Competition Council, which he chaired, and has spoken publicly on the need to increase entrepreneurship and reduce barriers to entry in key U.S. industries.

In February 2023, it was announced that Deese would be leaving his position. Vice Chair of the Federal Reserve Lael Brainard was selected as his replacement.

=== Massachusetts Institute of Technology ===
In July 2023, Deese was appointed the Institute Innovation Fellow at MIT. Deese's role as Fellow includes research and development of strategies to address climate change and promote sustainable economic growth. His extensive experience in government policy will provide practical insights into academic research. MIT anticipates his arrival will foster a productive nexus between policy-making and technological innovation, vital for addressing the global climate crisis. Deese's tenure commenced in the summer of 2023.

Political offices
Preceded by Heather Higginbottom	Deputy Director of the Office of Management and Budget; 2013–2015	Succeeded by Russell Vought
Preceded by Sylvia Mathews Burwell	Director of the Office of Management and Budget; Acting; 2014	Succeeded by Shaun Donovan
Preceded by Pete Rouse	Senior Advisor to the President; 2015–2017; Served alongside: Valerie Jarrett, Shailagh Murray	Succeeded by Jared Kushner; Stephen Miller
Preceded by Larry Kudlow	Director of the National Economic Council; 2021–2023	Succeeded by Lael Brainard
