= Executive Order 14036 =

2021 U.S. executive order on antitrust

- "Promoting Competition in the American Economy"
- Type: Executive order
- Number: 14036
- President: Joe Biden
- Signed: July 9, 2021

Federal Register details
- Federal Register document number: 2021-15069
- Publication date: July 9, 2021

Summary
- Authorizes an all-of-government approach to promoting competition and creates a White House Competition Council.

Repealed by
- Executive Order 14337, "Revocation of Executive Order on Competition", August 13, 2025

Executive Order 14036, titled Executive Order on Promoting Competition in the American Economy and sometimes referred to as the Executive Order on Competition, is the fifty-first executive order signed by U.S. President Joe Biden. Signed on July 9, 2021, the order served to establish a "whole-of-government effort to promote competition in the American economy" by encouraging stronger enforcement of antitrust law.

The executive order directed over a dozen federal agencies, including the Federal Trade Commission (FTC), to take action on 72 separate initiatives identified by the Biden administration as beneficial to reining in anti-competitive practices. Specific initiatives in the executive order include efforts to limit non-compete clauses, allow for hearing aids to be sold over the counter, and revive net neutrality. The order has been interpreted as supportive of the "right to repair" movement, which seeks to prohibit companies from making products prohibitively difficult to repair in order to encourage consumers to purchase new products.

The order additionally established the White House Competition Council, a fifteen-member committee led by National Economic Council (NEC) director Lael Brainard.

The order was revoked by President Donald Trump on August 13, 2025.

== Background ==
Antitrust enforcement in the United States began to decline in the 1970s, which coincided with the rise of the laissez-faire "consumer welfare standard" as the dominant approach to antitrust issues.

In the 2010s, concerns surrounding corporate concentration and wealth inequality led to a revived interest in antitrust enforcement. During the 2020 Democratic presidential primary, multiple contenders including then-candidate Biden indicated support for strengthening antitrust enforcement in the tech sector.

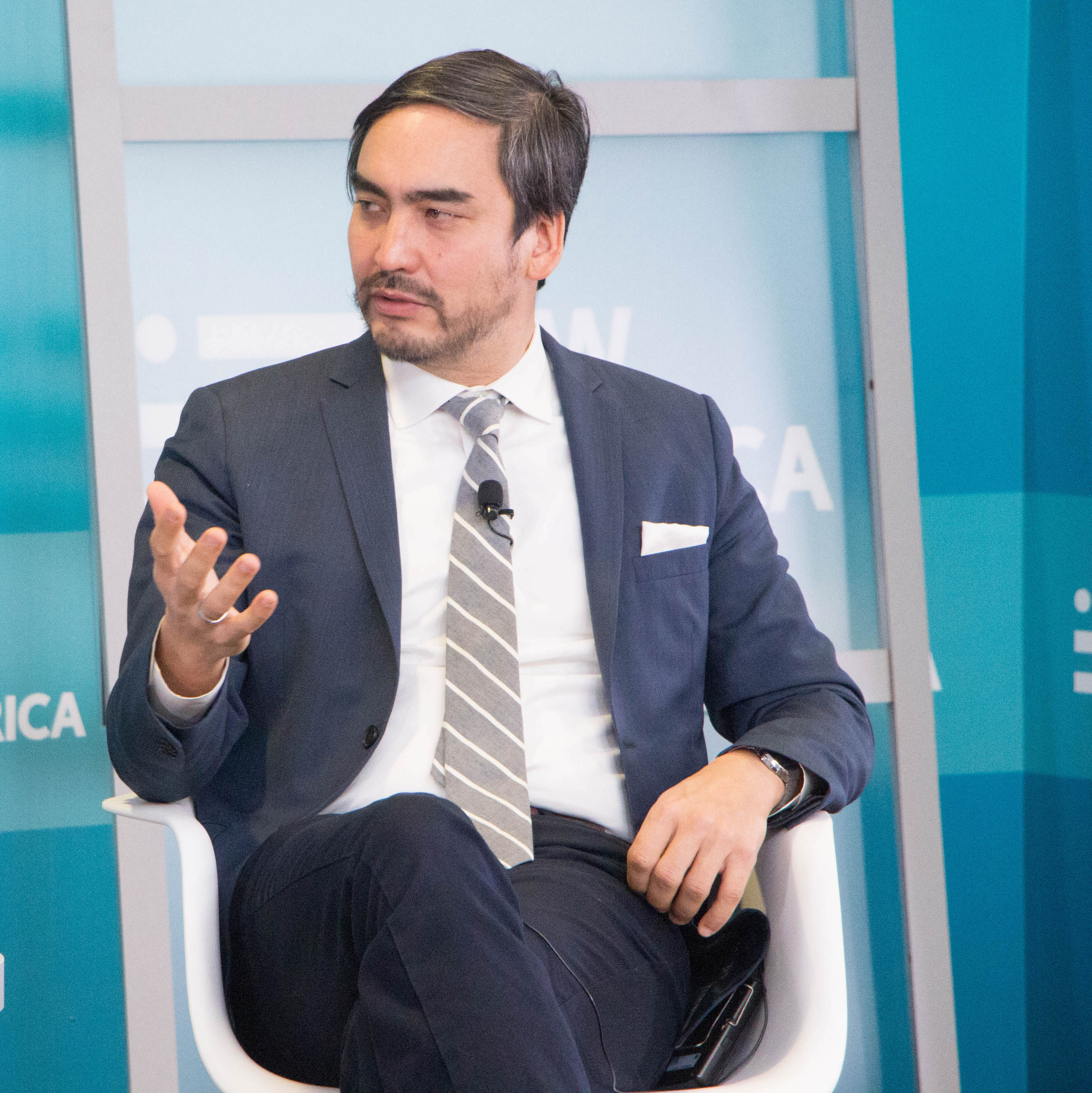
NEC advisor Tim Wu, a vocal antitrust proponent, has been credited with helping to author the executive order

As President, Biden appointed vocal proponents of antitrust enforcement to advisory and regulatory roles, including Tim Wu as an advisor at the NEC and Lina Khan as chairwoman of the FTC. Wu helped author Executive Order 14036 and assisted with its implementation during his time as an advisor.

== Provisions ==
Containing 72 provisions, the executive order was said to be "striking in its scope and ambition" by The Washington Post.

=== Antitrust enforcement ===
The order calls on the FTC and the Department of Justice (DOJ) to "enforce the antitrust laws vigorously and recognizes that the law allows them to challenge prior bad mergers that past administrations did not previously challenge" in areas such as the tech sector, labor markets, and the healthcare industry.

The executive order cites research by the American Economic Liberties Project (AELP), an anti-monopoly organization, that found that the median U.S. household loses $5,000 a year from wages that are lowered as a result of a lack of competition.

=== Agriculture ===
Under the executive order, the Department of Agriculture (USDA) is directed to consider new department rules that would strengthen enforcement of the Packers and Stockyards Act in order to make it easier for farmers to bring and win claims. The FTC is additionally directed to consider new initiatives to prevent equipment manufacturing companies from restricting farmers from repairing their tractors.

=== Net neutrality and broadband ===
The executive order encourages the Federal Communications Commission (FCC) to reinstate federal net neutrality regulations. According to Vice, the order prohibits telecom companies from levying early elimination penalties on consumers, and urges the FCC to implement rules "that would have required ISPs include a “nutrition label” on broadband connections".

== Reception and analysis ==
According to Politico, the order marks "the most ambitious effort in generations to reduce the stranglehold of monopolies and concentrated markets in major industries", and could be interpreted as a leftward shift by the Biden administration on economic policy.

Senator Elizabeth Warren of Massachusetts praised the order as a critical step towards reinvigorating competition. Neil Bradley, who serves as chief policy officer for the Chamber of Commerce, criticized the order and accused the White House of taking a “government-knows-best approach” at the expense of American businesses.

== White House Competition Council ==
Chair of the White House Competition Council

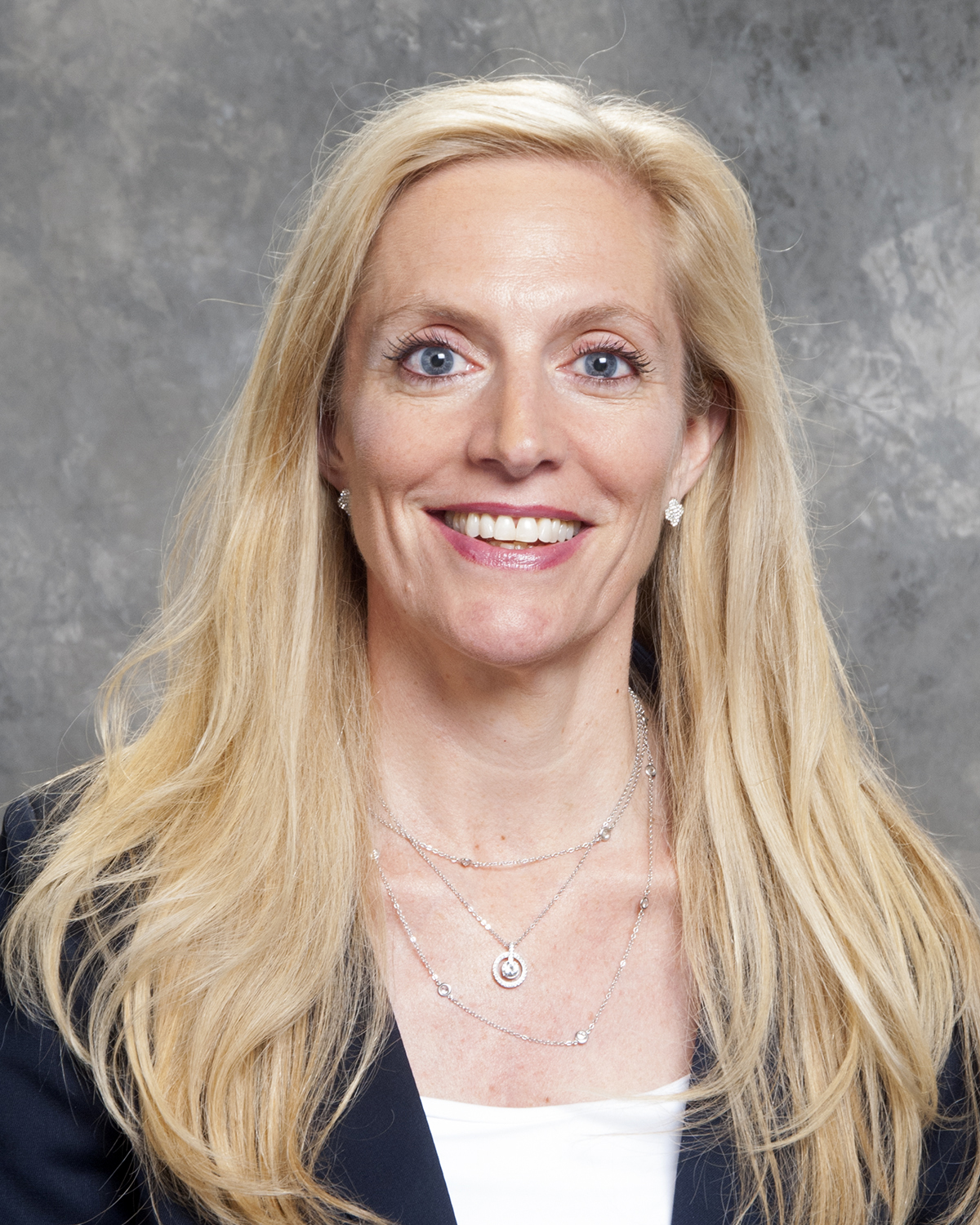
- Appointer: Joe Biden; as President of the United States
- Formation: 2021
- First holder: Brian Deese
- Abolished: 2025

The executive order created the White House Competition Council to coordinate inter-agency efforts to promote competition. The chair of the White House Competition Council is Lael Brainard, the director of the National Economic Council (NEC). She succeeded Brian Deese, the inaugural holder of the role, in February 2023.

=== Composition of the council ===
The council was composed of the following individuals:

==== Cabinet or cabinet-level officials ====
- Janet Yellen, Secretary of the Treasury
- Julie Su, acting Secretary of Labor
- Gina Raimondo, Secretary of Commerce
- Tom Vilsack, Secretary of Agriculture
- Pete Buttigieg, Secretary of Transportation
- Lloyd Austin, Secretary of Defense
- Xavier Becerra, Secretary of Health and Human Services
- Merrick Garland, Attorney General
- Katherine Tai, United States Trade Representative (USTR); joined council in September 2023

==== Advisors and heads of federal agencies ====
- Cecilia Rouse, Chairwoman of the Council of Economic Advisers (CEA)
- Shalanda Young, Director of the Office of Management and Budget (OMB)
- Lina Khan, Chairwoman of the Federal Trade Commission (FTC)
- Gary Gensler, Chairman of the Securities and Exchange Commission (SEC)
- Jessica Rosenworcel, Chairwoman of the Federal Communications Commission (FCC)
- Martin J. Oberman, Chairman of the Surface Transportation Board (STB)
- Dan Maffei, Chairman of the Federal Maritime Commission (FMC)
- Rostin Behnam, Chairman of the Commodity Futures Trading Commission (CFTC)
- Rohit Chopra, Director of the Consumer Financial Protection Bureau (CFPB)

==== Other personnel ====
Additionally, Hannah Garden-Monheit, a member of the NEC, was named by Biden to serve on the council as Director of Competition Council Policy on July 18, 2023. In November 2023, it was reported that Garden-Monheit would leave the council to join the FTC.

=== Council meetings ===
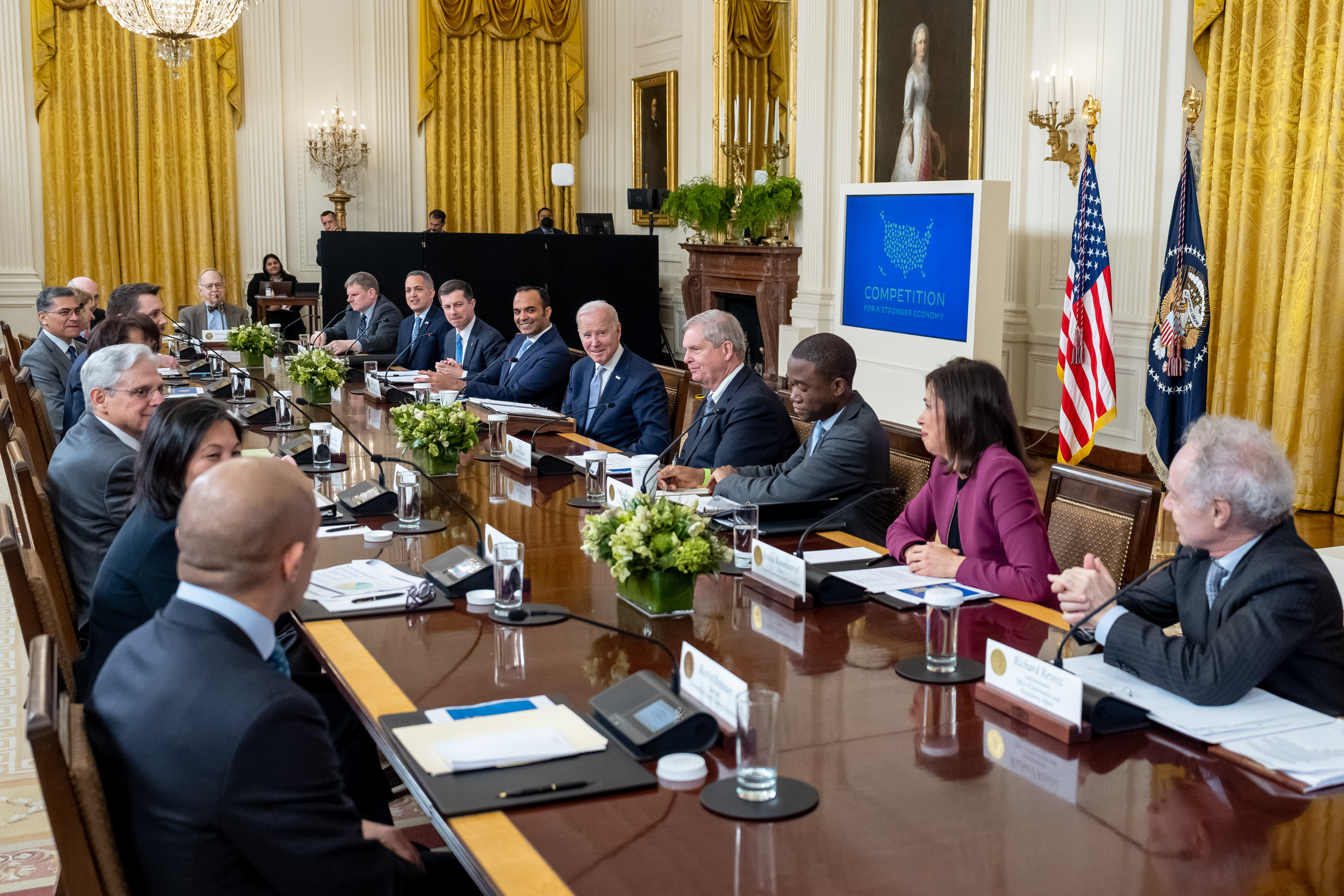
Meeting of the White House Competition Council on February 1, 2023

The first meeting of the White House Competition Council convened on September 10, 2021 in the Roosevelt Room of the White House, with the meeting led by inaugural director Brian Deese. A White House official stated that the meeting would serve to "drive home that promoting competition is a cornerstone of POTUS’ Build Back Better agenda". Biden attended the council's second meeting on January 24, 2023, where he stated that increased competition "results in lower prices for families" and "fair wages for workers".

The White House reconvened the council for a third meeting on September 26, 2022, with FCC chair Rosenworcel attending virtually. A fourth meeting of the council was held on February 1, 2023, which coincided with the Biden administration announcing new policy initiatives related to credit card fees and app market charges. At the council's fifth meeting, held on July 19, 2023, Biden criticized "hidden junk fees" for prospective tenants.

== See also ==
- List of executive actions by Joe Biden
