= Jerome Powell =

American financier (born 1953)

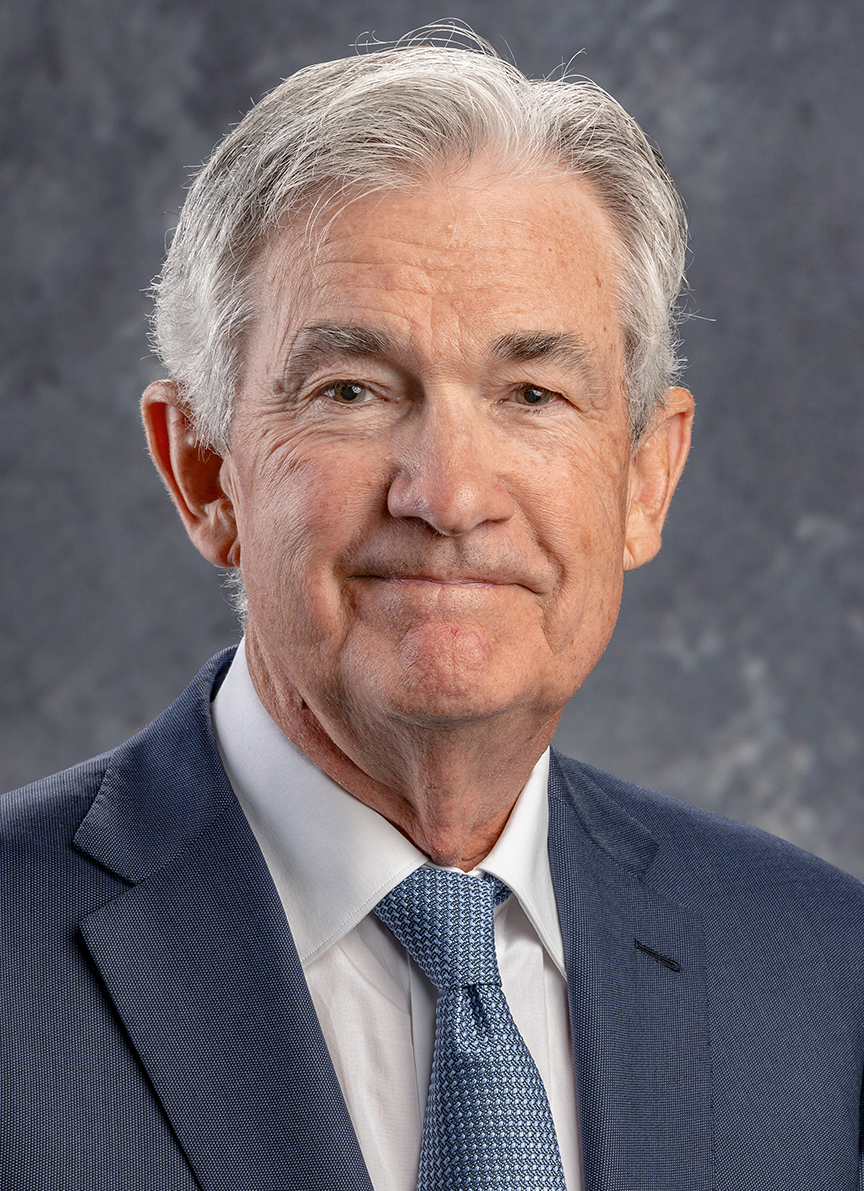
- Official portrait, 2022

16th Chair of the Federal Reserve
- In office February 5, 2018 – May 22, 2026 (Note: Acting: February 5 – May 23, 2022; May 15–22, 2026)
- President: Donald Trump; Joe Biden; Donald Trump
- Deputy: Richard Clarida; Lael Brainard; Philip Jefferson
- Preceded by: Janet Yellen
- Succeeded by: Kevin Warsh

Member of the Federal Reserve Board of Governors
- Incumbent
- Assumed office May 25, 2012
- Nominated by: Barack Obama
- Preceded by: Frederic Mishkin

Under Secretary of the Treasury for Domestic Finance
- In office April 7, 1992 – January 20, 1993
- President: George H. W. Bush
- Preceded by: Robert R. Glauber
- Succeeded by: Frank N. Newman

Assistant Secretary of the Treasury for Financial Institutions
- In office 1990 – April 7, 1992
- President: George H. W. Bush
- Preceded by: David W. Mullins Jr.
- Succeeded by: John Cunningham Dugan

Personal details
- Born: Jerome Hayden Powell; February 4, 1953 (age 73) Washington, D.C., U.S.
- Party: Republican
- Spouse: Elissa Leonard (m. 1985)
- Children: 3
- Education: Princeton University (BA); Georgetown University (JD)
- Nickname: Jay Powell
- Powell's voice Powell outlines the Fed's semiannual monetary policy report at a Senate Banking Committee hearing. Recorded February 26, 2019

Jerome Hayden "Jay" Powell (born February 4, 1953) is an American central banker, lawyer, and investment banker who served as the governor of the Federal Reserve. He was the 16th chair of the Federal Reserve from 2018 to 2026. After his term as chair ended on May 22, 2026, Powell remained a member of the Federal Reserve Board of Governors. His term as a governor runs through January 31, 2028. He was previously both a lawyer and investment banker in the private sector before entering public service.

A native of Washington, D.C., Powell graduated from Princeton University and the Georgetown University Law Center. After working as an attorney for five years, he began a career in investment banking and private equity during the mid-1980s, eventually becoming a partner at the Carlyle Group in 1997. He left Carlyle in 2005 to launch Severn Capital Partners, a boutique private equity firm. He was a visiting scholar at the Bipartisan Policy Center from 2010 to 2012.

Powell entered public service in 1990, serving in multiple positions within the United States Treasury Department under President George H. W. Bush. He became a member of the Federal Reserve Board of Governors upon President Barack Obama's nomination in 2012. President Donald Trump elevated Powell to Chair in 2018 and President Joe Biden re-nominated him in 2021. As a Fed governor, Powell built a reputation during the 2010s as a consensus-builder in Washington.

Under Powell, the Federal Reserve navigated the economic impact of the COVID-19 pandemic, the 2021–2023 inflation surge, and global trade instability. His tenure saw a broad uplift in financial markets apart from three notable stock markets declines in 2020, in 2022, and in 2025. The scale and type of monetary stimulus pursued by Powell led to a noted divergence between the U.S. economy and the nation's financial sector, leading to mixed reception among the American public.

== Early life and education ==
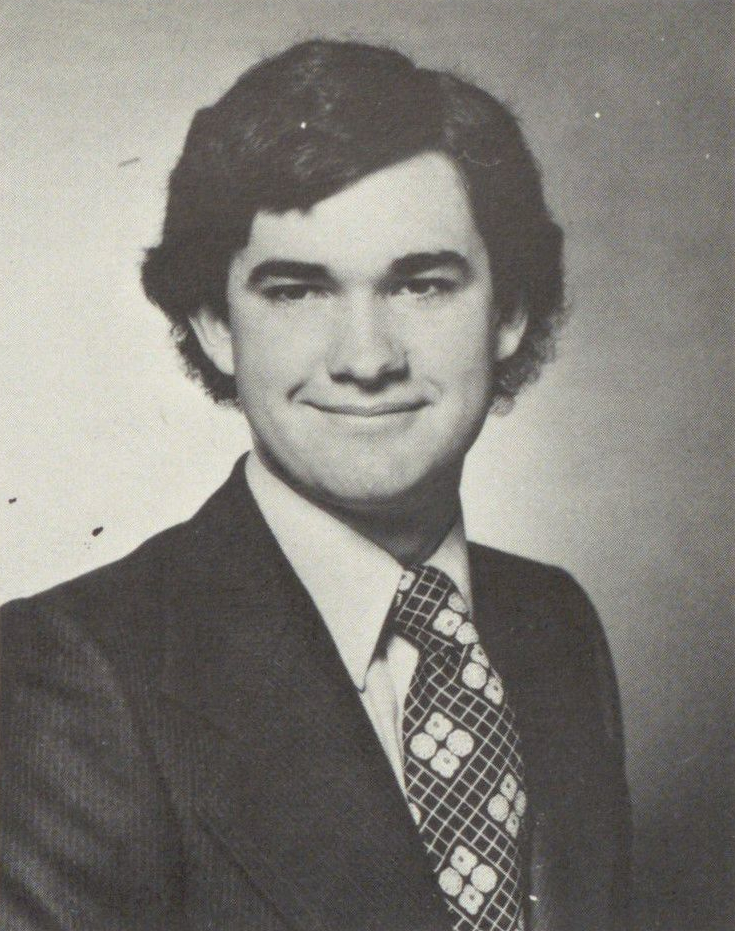
Powell in the Princeton University yearbook, 1975

Jerome Powell was born on February 4, 1953, in Washington, D.C. to Patricia (née Hayden) and Jerome Powell Sr., a lawyer in private practice. His maternal grandfather, James J. Hayden, was Dean of the Columbus School of Law at Catholic University of America and later a lecturer at Georgetown Law School. He has five siblings.

Powell graduated from Georgetown Preparatory School, a Jesuit university-preparatory school, in 1971. He received a Bachelor of Arts in politics from Princeton University in 1975, where his senior thesis was titled "South Africa: Forces for Change." After spending a year as a legislative assistant to Republican U.S. Senator Richard Schweiker of Pennsylvania, Powell attended the Georgetown University Law Center. He was editor-in-chief of the Georgetown Law Journal and graduated in 1979 with a Juris Doctor.

== Early career ==
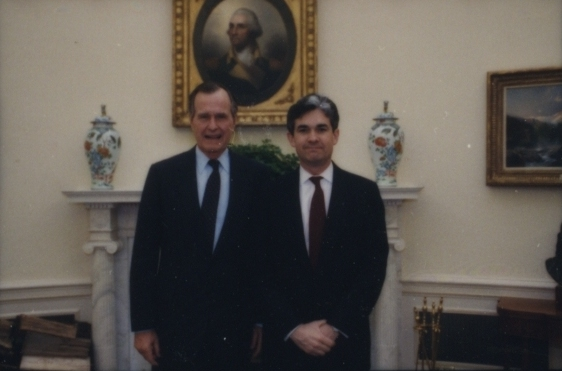
Powell with President George H. W. Bush in January 1993

=== Legal and investment banking ===
After law school, Powell moved to New York City and spent two years as a law clerk to Judge Ellsworth Van Graafeiland of the U.S. Court of Appeals for the Second Circuit. He then entered private practice at the law firm Davis Polk & Wardwell before moving to the firm of Werbel & McMillen in 1983.

From 1984 to 1990, Powell worked at investment bank Dillon, Read & Co. (later acquired by UBS), where he concentrated on financing, merchant banking, and mergers and acquisitions, rising to the position of vice president.

Between 1990 and 1993, Powell worked in the United States Department of the Treasury, at which time Nicholas F. Brady, the former chairman of Dillon, Read & Co., was the United States Secretary of the Treasury. In 1992, Powell became the Under Secretary of the Treasury for Domestic Finance after being nominated by George H. W. Bush. During his stint at the Treasury, Powell oversaw the investigation and sanctioning of Salomon Brothers after one of its traders submitted false bids for a United States Treasury security. Powell was also involved in the negotiations that made Warren Buffett the chairman of Salomon Brothers.

In 1993, Powell began working as a managing director for Bankers Trust. He left in 1995 after the bank suffered reputational damage when some complex derivative transactions caused large losses for major corporate clients. He then went back to work for Dillon, Read & Co. From 1997 to 2005, Powell was a partner at the Carlyle Group, where he founded and led the Industrial Group within the Carlyle U.S. Buyout Fund. After leaving Carlyle, Powell founded Severn Capital Partners, a small private equity firm focused on specialty finance and opportunistic investments in the industrial sector. In 2008, Powell became a managing partner of the Global Environment Fund, a private equity and venture capital firm that invests in sustainable energy.

Between 2010 and 2012, Powell was a visiting scholar at the Bipartisan Policy Center, a think tank in Washington, D.C., where he worked on getting Congress to raise the United States debt ceiling during the United States debt-ceiling crisis of 2011. Powell presented the implications to the economy and interest rates of a default or a delay in raising the debt ceiling. He worked for a salary of $1 per year.

=== Federal Reserve Board of Governors (2012–2018) ===
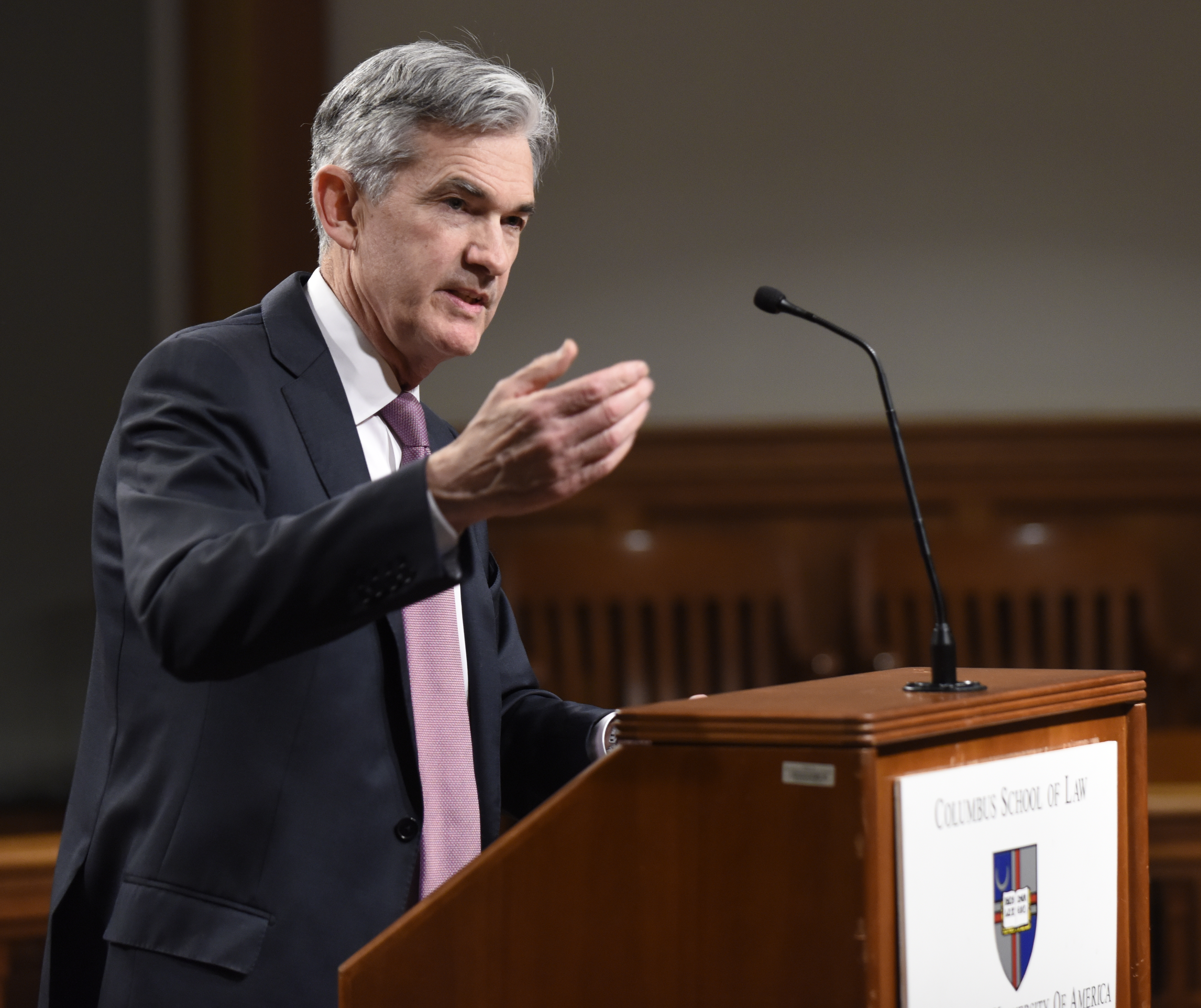
Powell speaks at the Columbus School of Law in February 2015

In December 2011, along with Jeremy C. Stein, Powell was nominated to the Federal Reserve Board of Governors by President Barack Obama. The nomination included two people to help garner bipartisan support for both nominees since Stein's nomination had previously been filibustered. Powell's nomination was the first time since 1988 that a president nominated a member of the opposition party for such a position. He took office on May 25, 2012, filling the unexpired term vacated by Frederic Mishkin. In June 2014, he was reappointed to the Board of Governors for a full 14-year term, after being confirmed by the United States Senate in a 67–24 vote. His term as a member of the Board of Governors ends January 31, 2028. (Note: The chair of the Board of Governors serves a four-year term that is separate from, and runs concurrently with, their term as a governor. Powell's term as chair ends May 15, 2026; but his term as a governor ends January 31, 2028.)

Powell was a skeptic of round 3 of quantitative easing (or QE3), initiated in September 2012, although he eventually voted for it.

In 2013 Powell endorsed financial regulation to end the problem of institutions that are too big to fail, while urging that it should be implemented carefully. In April 2017, he was assigned to head the bank oversight committee.

In a July 2017 speech, Powell said that in regard to Fannie Mae and Freddie Mac the status quo is "unacceptable" and that the current situation "may feel comfortable, but it is also unsustainable." He warned that "the next few years may present our last best chance" to "address the ultimate status of Fannie Mae and Freddie Mac" and avoid "repeating the mistakes of the past." Powell expressed concerns that, in the current situation, the government is responsible for mortgage defaults and that lending standards were too rigid, noting that these can be solved by encouraging "ample amounts of private capital to support housing finance activities."

In an October 2017 speech, Powell stated that higher capital and liquidity requirements and stress tests from the Dodd–Frank Wall Street Reform and Consumer Protection Act have made the financial system safer and must be preserved. However, he also stated that the Volcker Rule should be re-written to exclude smaller banks.

== Federal Reserve Chairman (2018–2026) ==
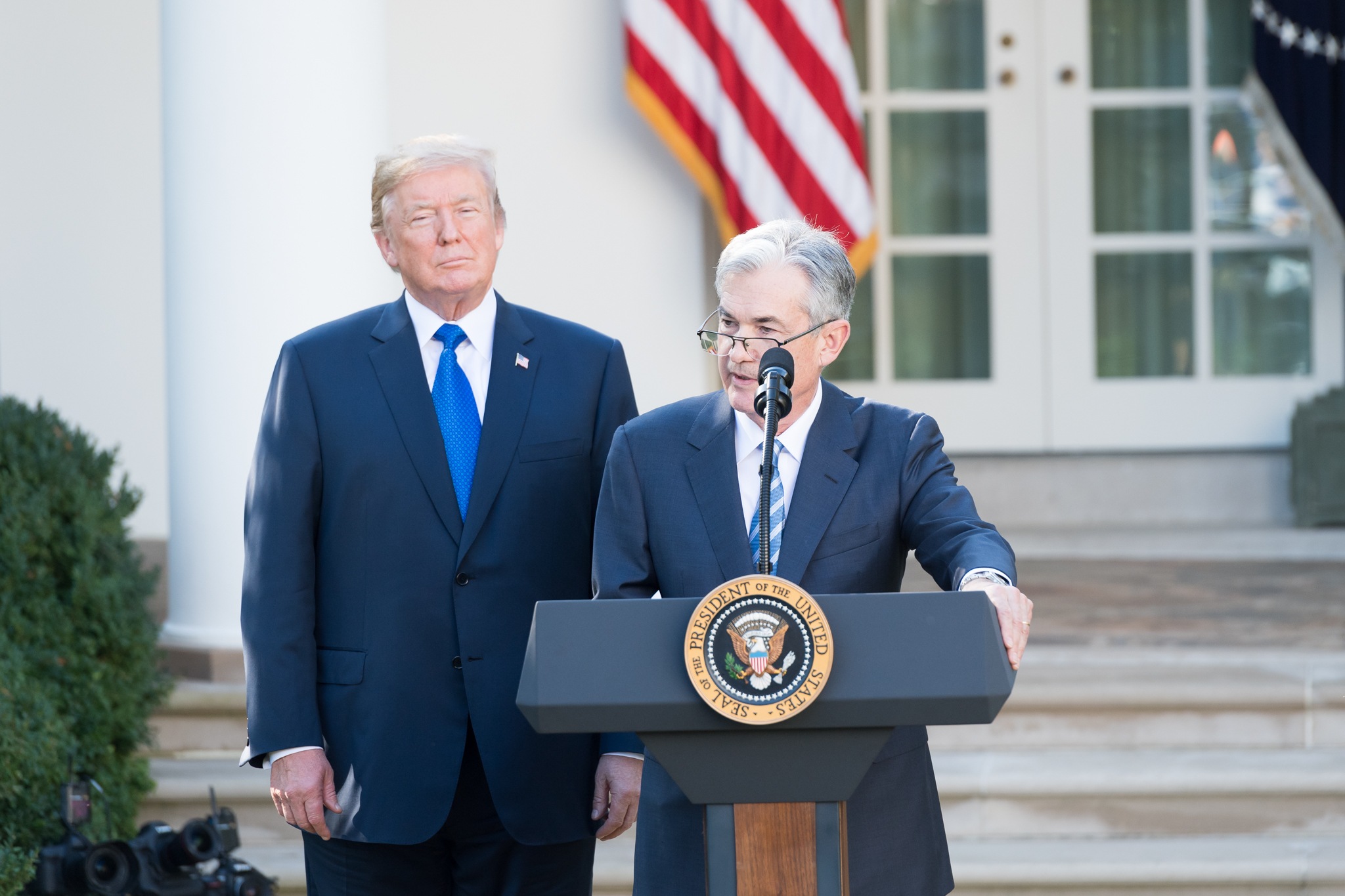
President Donald Trump nominates Powell in November 2017

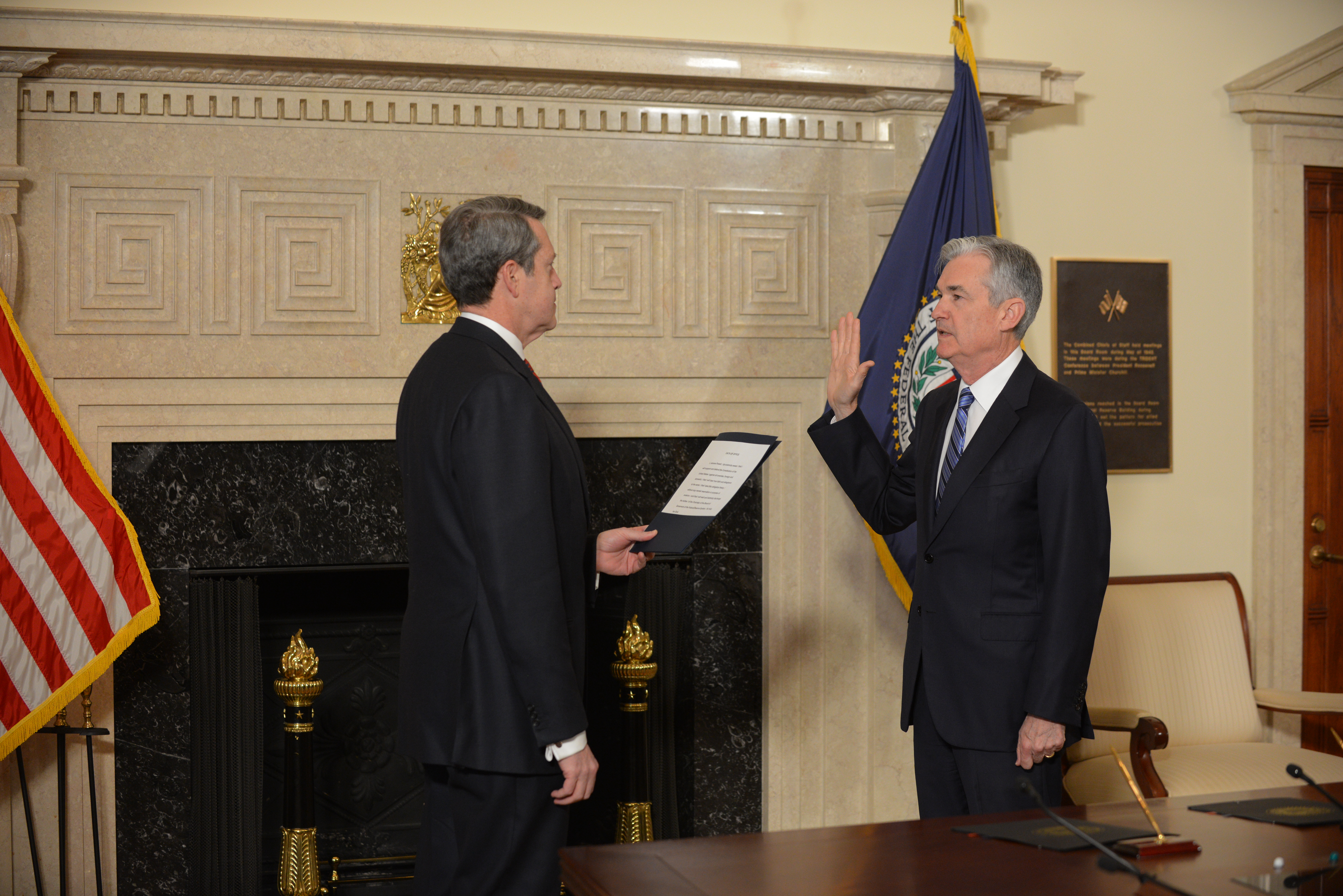
Powell takes the oath of office, administered by Randal Quarles, as chair in February 2018

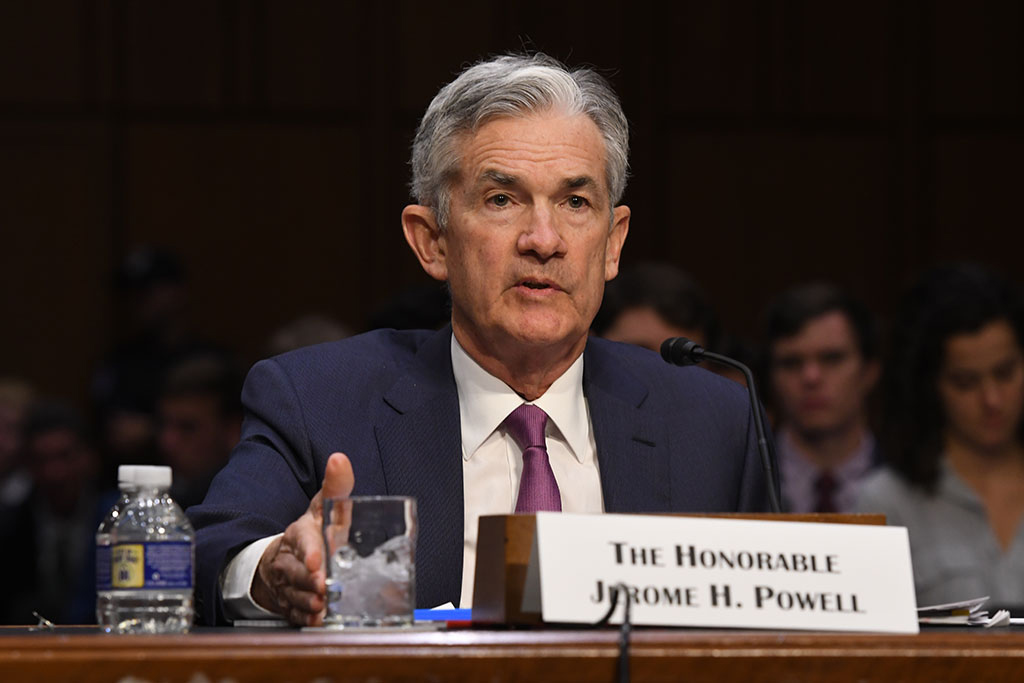
Powell testifies before the U.S. Senate Committee on Banking, Housing, and Urban Affairs in 2018

On November 2, 2017, President Donald Trump nominated Powell to serve as the chairman of the Federal Reserve, replacing Janet Yellen at the helm of the central bank. On December 5, the Senate Banking Committee approved Powell's nomination to be chair in a 22–1 vote, with Senator Elizabeth Warren casting the lone dissenting vote. His nomination was confirmed by the Senate on January 23, 2018, by an 84–13 vote. Powell assumed office as chair on February 5, 2018.

=== First Trump administration (2018–2021) ===
One of Powell's first actions was to continue to raise US interest rates, as a response to the increasing strength of the US economy. He also announced that the Fed would reduce its asset portfolio from $4.5 trillion to a range of $2.5–3 trillion over four years in a process called quantitative tightening. This tight policy drew public criticism from President Trump, who expressed second thoughts about nominating Powell and said that the chair was too enthusiastic about raising rates. Financial assets of all classes declined over 2018 and markets erupted in volatility in December. Powell abandoned quantitative tightening in early 2019, leading to a recovery in asset prices. Trump continued to state, with increasing hostility, that Powell was not reacting quickly enough. As a trade war with China escalated over the summer of 2019, Trump called the Fed's policies "insane" and labelled Powell an "enemy." He privately discussed with White House counsel the possibility of firing Powell, which Powell dismissed. In an August interview, Trump said that he completely disagreed with Powell's approach and called for a sharp cut in interest rates. Trump also questioned if Powell or General Secretary Xi Jinping of the Chinese Communist Party was a greater "enemy" of the United States.

In October 2019, as asset prices waned, Powell announced the Fed would return to expanding its balance sheet, which led to a global rally in assets. Powell said the Fed's actions were not quantitative easing, but some dubbed them as being QE4. Where Bernanke-era quantitative easing was conducted through outright purchases of assets, Powell's expansion operates through overnight repurchase agreements (repos) where the seller has the option to reverse the transaction. The Fed's primary dealers and other banks use the repo facilities to sell Treasury and agency securities in exchange for credit to supplement their cash on hand.

==== COVID-19 recession response ====
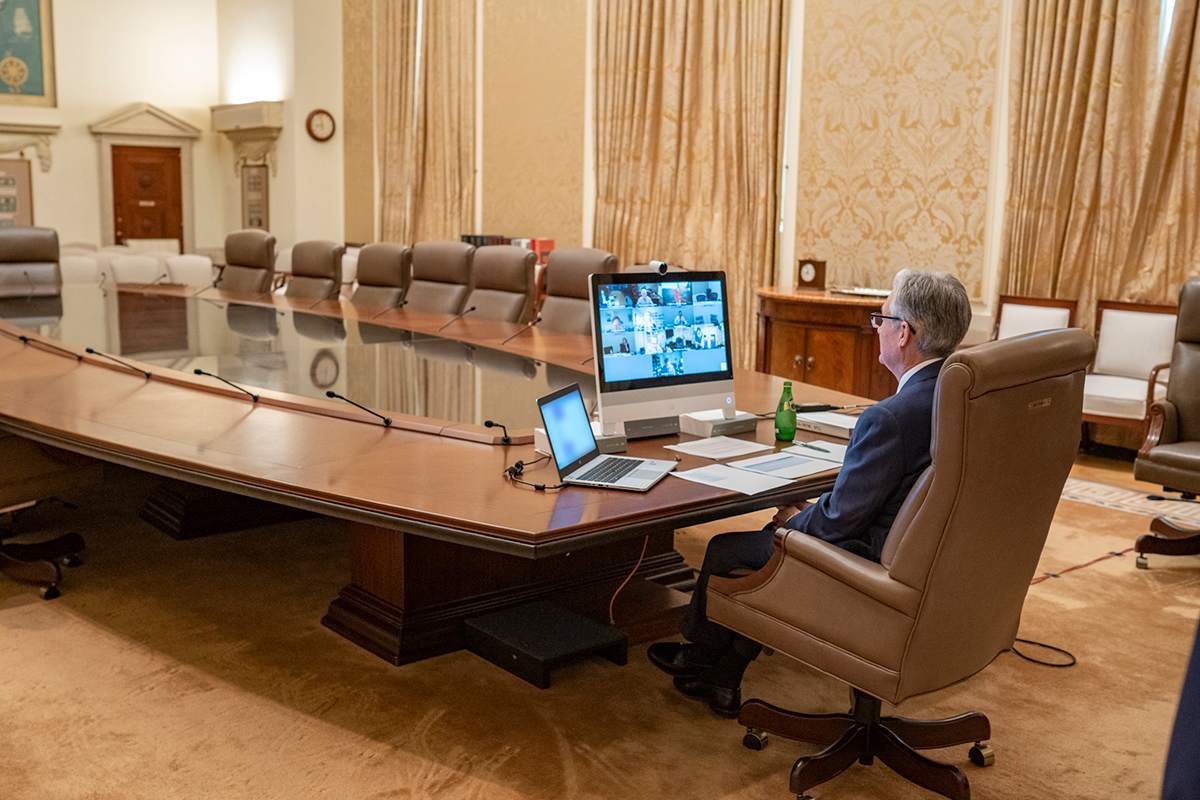
Powell speaks with the Federal Open Market Committee via videotelephony in June 2020

In early 2020, Powell launched an unprecedented series of actions to counter the financial market impact of the COVID-19 pandemic, which included a dramatic expansion of the Fed's balance sheet and introduction of new tools, including the direct purchase of corporate bonds and direct lending programs. Powell emphasized monetary policy alone without an equivalent fiscal policy response from Congress would widen income inequality. Powell's actions earned him bipartisan praise, including from Trump, who told Fox News that he was "very happy with his performance" and that "over the last period of six months, he's really stepped up to the plate."

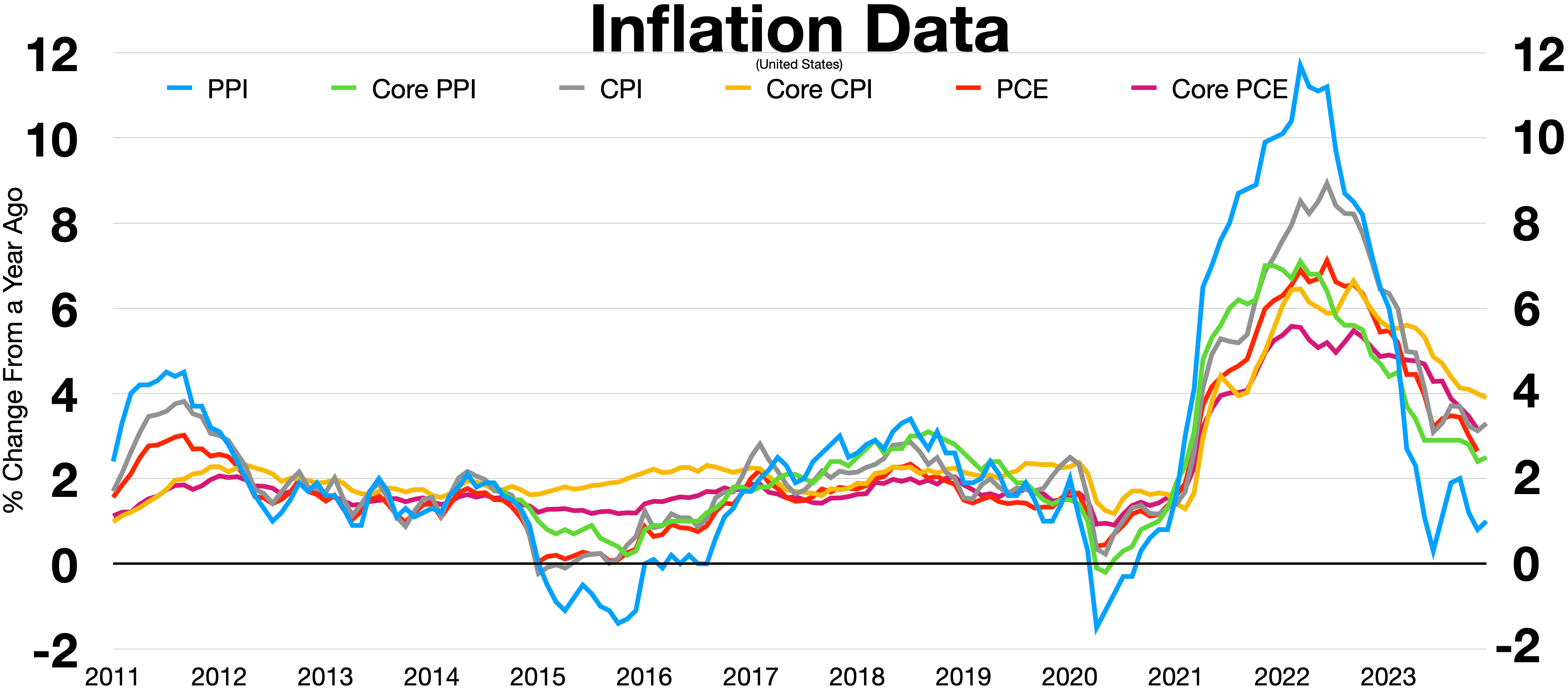
CPI inflation reaching 7% as of 2021

On November 19, 2020, after disagreeing with Treasury Secretary Steve Mnuchin, Powell agreed to return unused crisis funds to the United States Treasury. Both he and Mnuchin then urged Congress to approve more stimulus.

==== Asset price inflation ====
To mitigate the financial market impact of the COVID-19 pandemic, Powell accepted asset price inflation as a consequence of Fed policy actions. Powell was criticized for using high levels of direct and indirect quantitative easing as valuations hit levels last seen at the peaks of previous bubbles.

The Fed's acceptance of asset price inflation from 2019 onwards resulted in levels of wealth inequality not seen in the United States since the 1920s. Fed asset purchases were also seen as contributing to the K-shaped recovery that emerged during the coronavirus pandemic, where the asset bubbles protected the wealthier segments of society from the financial effects of the pandemic, at the expense of most other segments, and particularly on the younger non-asset owning segments such as millennials. In January 2021, Edward Luce of the Financial Times warned that the Fed's use of asset purchases, and the resultant widening of wealth inequality, could lead to political and social instability in the United States, saying: "The majority of people are suffering amid a Great Gatsby-style boom at the top."

Powell's expansion of credit through repo contracts, seen as a new "Greenspan put," created large profits for Wall Street investment banks. In June 2020, Jim Grant likened Powell's policy to drug dealing, calling him "the Fed's Dr. Feelgood." In a September 2020 testimony, Powell said: "Our actions were in no way an attempt to relieve pain on Wall Street." By the end of 2020, Wall Street investment banks recorded their best year in history, and Bloomberg called 2020," a great year for Wall Street, but a bear market for Humans." Mohamed El-Erian called Powell "a follower, not a leader," of markets.

Powell defended his actions saying: "I don't know that the connection between asset purchases and financial stability is a particularly tight one," and that he wasn't worried that the Fed's actions were creating asset bubbles.

In July 2020, CNBC host Jim Cramer said, "I'm sick and tired of hearing that we're in a bubble, that Powell's overinflating the price of stocks by printing money to keep the economy moving." The Washington Post called the Fed "addicted to propping up markets, even when there is no need." In August 2020, investors Leon Cooperman and Seth Klarman warned of a dangerous "speculative bubble," with market psychology "unhinged from market fundamentals."

In August 2020, Bloomberg News called Powell's policy "exuberantly asymmetric" (echoing Alan Greenspan's "irrational exuberance" quote from 1996), and that the "Powell Put" had become more extreme than the "Greenspan Put." Steven Pearlstein in The Washington Post said that Powell had "adopted a strategy that works like a one-way ratchet, providing a floor for stock and bond prices but never a ceiling," and that any attempt by Powell to abandon this strategy "will trigger a sharp sell-off by investors who have become addicted to monetary stimulus."

By December 2020, Powell's monetary policy, measured by the Goldman Sachs US Financial Conditions Index (GSFCI), was the loosest in the history of the GSFCI (beginning in 1987), and had created simultaneous asset bubbles across most of the major asset classes in the United States: For example, in equities, in housing, and in bonds. Cryptocurrencies also saw dramatic increases in price during 2020, leading Powell to win the 2020 Forbes Person Of The Year In Crypto.

High up on his list, and sooner rather than later, will be dealing with the consequences of the biggest financial bubble in U.S. history. Why the biggest? Because it encompasses not just stocks but pretty much every other financial asset too. And for that, you may thank the Federal Reserve.

— Richard Cookson, Bloomberg (4 February 2021)

The asset price boom during the pandemic attracted a generation of young investors who explicitly credited Powell for promoting froth in financial markets. Gathering in online communities like Reddit's r/wallstreetbets board, they discussed high-risk trades and shared memes that depicted "J-Pow" using the Fed's money printer to flood the economy.

In December 2020, Powell defended high asset prices by invoking the controversial Fed model, saying: "Admittedly P/Es are high but that's maybe not as relevant in a world where we think the 10-year Treasury is going to be lower than it's been historically from a return perspective." The author of the Fed model, Edward Yardeni, said Powell's actions could form the greatest financial bubble in history, while the Wall Street Journal described Powell's comparison as an attempt to "rewrite the laws of investing."

Powell received both bipartisan praise and criticism for the Federal Reserve's aggressive monetary actions in early 2020 to address the economic impact of the COVID-19 pandemic. While some commended the Fed's intervention, others raised concerns about the long-term consequences of the Fed's policies, including the potential for severe inflation and increased wealth inequality. As the Federal Reserve continued to apply high levels of monetary stimulus to further raise asset prices and support growth, some observers perceived a disconnect between asset prices and the economy. Powell has responded by arguing that supporting the Fed's dual mandate of stable prices and full employment outweighed concern over high asset prices. Time said the scale and manner of Powell's actions had "changed the Fed forever" and shared concerns that he had conditioned Wall Street to unsustainable levels of monetary stimulus to artificially support high asset prices. In November 2020, Bloomberg News called Powell "Wall Street's Head of State," as a reflection of how dominant Powell's actions were on asset prices and how profitable his actions were for Wall Street.

==== Conflict with Trump ====
Powell's tenure began with an effort to argue for the independence of the Federal Reserve and to avoid criticism from Trump. In July 2018, Trump said in a CNBC interview that he was "not thrilled" at Powell for raising interest rates. He continued his criticism of Powell through August, reiterating to Reuters that he was still "not thrilled" with interest rate increases. In an interview with Bloomberg News, Trump said that he did not regret appointing Powell. In October, Powell said he was focusing on "controlling the controllable" at The Atlantic Festival. At a press conference that month, Trump decried the Federal Reserve as "crazy", "loco", and said that it had "gone wild" with interest rate increases, leading to concerns that Trump could attempt to dismiss Powell; Trump rejected that claim. The Federal Reserve disregarded the comments, according to Politico. Steven Mnuchin, the secretary of the Treasury, and Larry Kudlow, the director of the National Economic Council, downplayed Trump's remarks. That month, Axios reported that Trump would not cease his insults against Powell, citing the belief that Powell would eventually lower rates. Trump told The Wall Street Journal that he "maybe" regretted appointing Powell and accused him of taking pleasure in increasing interest rates.

In November, Trump said he was displeased with Powell in an interview with The Washington Post, and attributed a stock market decline and layoffs at General Motors to Powell. After Powell announced another interest rate increase the following month, Trump asked advisors if he could legally fire Powell; according to Bloomberg News, the Office of White House Counsel examined the request in February 2019. The New York Times reported that Trump had privately compared his legacy to Herbert Hoover with Powell's decisions and that he had told Stephen Moore, an economist for The Heritage Foundation, that appointing Powell was "one of the worst choices" he had made. In January 2019, Powell said he would not resign if asked to do so by Trump. Powell was present at a dinner at the White House with Trump, Mnuchin, and vice chair Richard Clarida in February. Trump continued to pressure Powell through April,including by announcing that he would nominate Moore and Herman Cain, a businessman and politician, to the Board of Governors. Trump renewed his criticism in June, appearing to praise the People's Bank of China's absence of independence under Chinese president Xi Jinping. After Bloomberg News reported on the White House Counsel's assessment on firing Powell that month, Trump left open the possibility of removing him. As Trump asserted that he gave Powell prominence, he believed that he had the authority to fire Powell, according to Bloomberg.

Powell's interest rate strategy retained support from several Republican senators, including Pat Toomey of Pennsylvania and Richard Shelby of Alabama. After Powell said that the China–United States trade war caused uncertainty for the central bank in August, Trump questioned if Powell or Xi Jinping was a greater "enemy" of the United States. Internal emails obtained by The New York Times showed concern within the Federal Reserve, though comments made by North Dakota senator Kevin Cramer, a Republican, were widely disseminated, including to Powell. Trump's trade policies are believed to have forced the Federal Reserve to lower interest rates, according to Politico. The following month, Trump urged Powell to lower interest rates to "zero, or less". Powell continued to value the importance of an independent Federal Reserve at the premiere of Marriner Eccles: Father of the Modern Federal Reserve in October, a film about the late chairman Marriner S. Eccles. That month, he signaled that the Federal Reserve would not reduce interest rates indefinitely. Appearing before the Congressional Joint Economic Committee in November, Powell publicly rebuked a negative interest rate as "certainly not" appropriate. That month, Trump and Powell, joined by Mnuchin, met at the White House, where Powell stated that the Federal Reserve would remain "nonpolitical".

In March 2020, amid initial onset of the COVID-19 pandemic in the United States, Trump repeated his claim that he could fire Powell, though he tempered his comments afterwards.

=== Biden administration (2021–2025) ===
In April 2021, Powell reassured concerns over a potential housing bubble, similar to the one that preceded the Great Recession. He stated, "we don't see bad loans and unsustainable prices and that kind of thing."

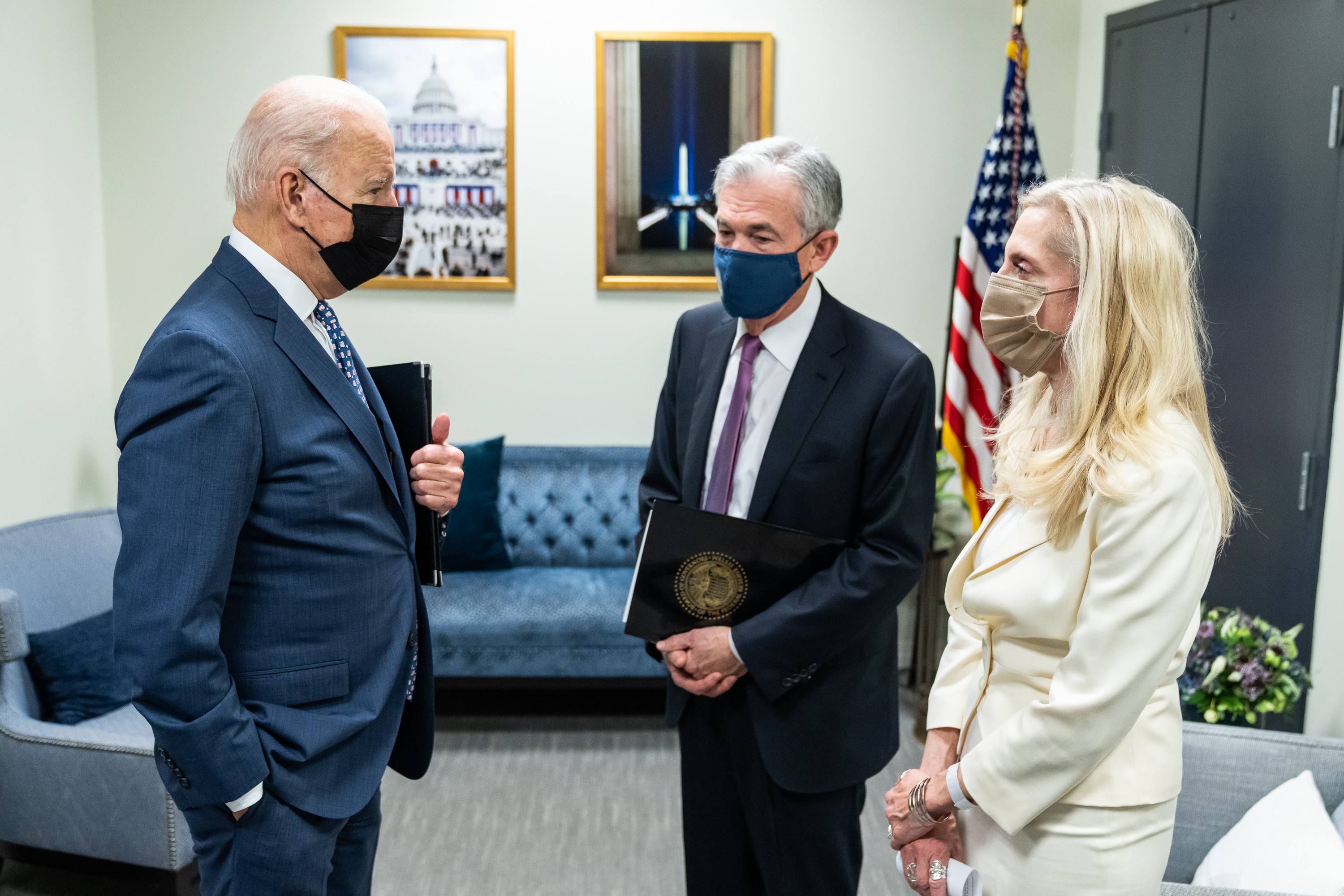
President Joe Biden with Powell and Lael Brainard in November 2021

In August 2021, Powell expected the Fed to reduce economic support later in the year. Powell considered inflation transitory—a term Powell states should now be "retired." By December, Jerome Powell indicated an increase in the speed of tapering asset purchases—up to $30 billion per month—in response to widespread high inflation readings. In Jerome Powell's confirmation hearing in 2022 he described inflation as being a "severe threat" to the U.S. economic recovery due to "higher costs of essentials like food, housing and transportation."

In response to high inflation, the U.S. Federal Reserve began its rate hike cycle on March 17, 2022 when it raised rates by 25 basis points. The central bank proceeded to hike rates ten more times through July 2023—raising the benchmark rate by 5.25% cumulatively. US CPI—a widely used measure of inflation—peaked at 9.1% y/y in July 2022.

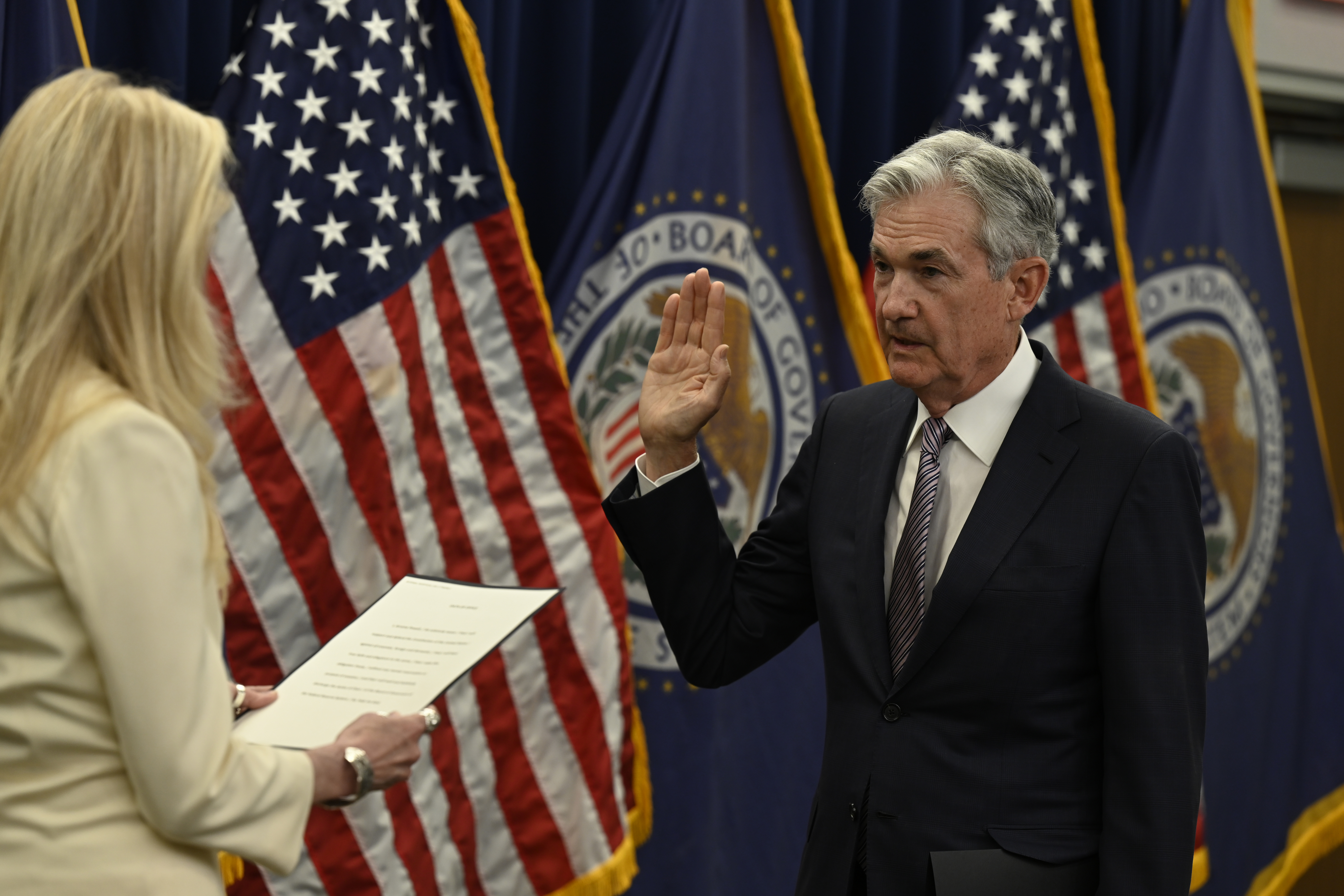
Powell sworn in for his second term as chair by Lael Brainard in May 2022

In light of his term as chair expiring in February 2022, many Democrats began to express opposition to Powell's reappointment. In August 2021, progressive Democrats, including Alexandria Ocasio-Cortez, called on President Joe Biden to replace Powell, criticizing him for failing to "mitigate the risk climate change poses to our financial system." In September 2021, Senator Elizabeth Warren, Democrat of Massachusetts, criticized Powell for his financial regulation track record and called him a "dangerous man to head up the Fed." Powell was renominated for a second term by President Joe Biden on November 22, 2021. His initial nomination expired at the end of the year and was returned to President Biden on January 3, 2022.

President Biden presented his nomination to the Senate the following day. Hearings were held on Powell's nomination before the Senate Banking Committee on January 11, 2022. The committee favorably reported Powell's nomination to the Senate floor on March 16, 2022, in a 22–1 vote; Senator Elizabeth Warren was the lone member to vote against his nomination. His nomination for another term as chair through May 2026 was confirmed by the full U.S. Senate on May 12, 2022, in an 80–19 vote. He was sworn in for his second term as chair on May 23, 2022. Following Biden's renomination of Powell, the Fed Chairman retired his previous words "transitory inflation," and indicated a reduction in quantitative easing (QE) and mortgage-backed security (MBS) purchases due to the 2021–2023 inflation surge, with the consumer price index (CPI) in November 2021 having reached 6.8%.

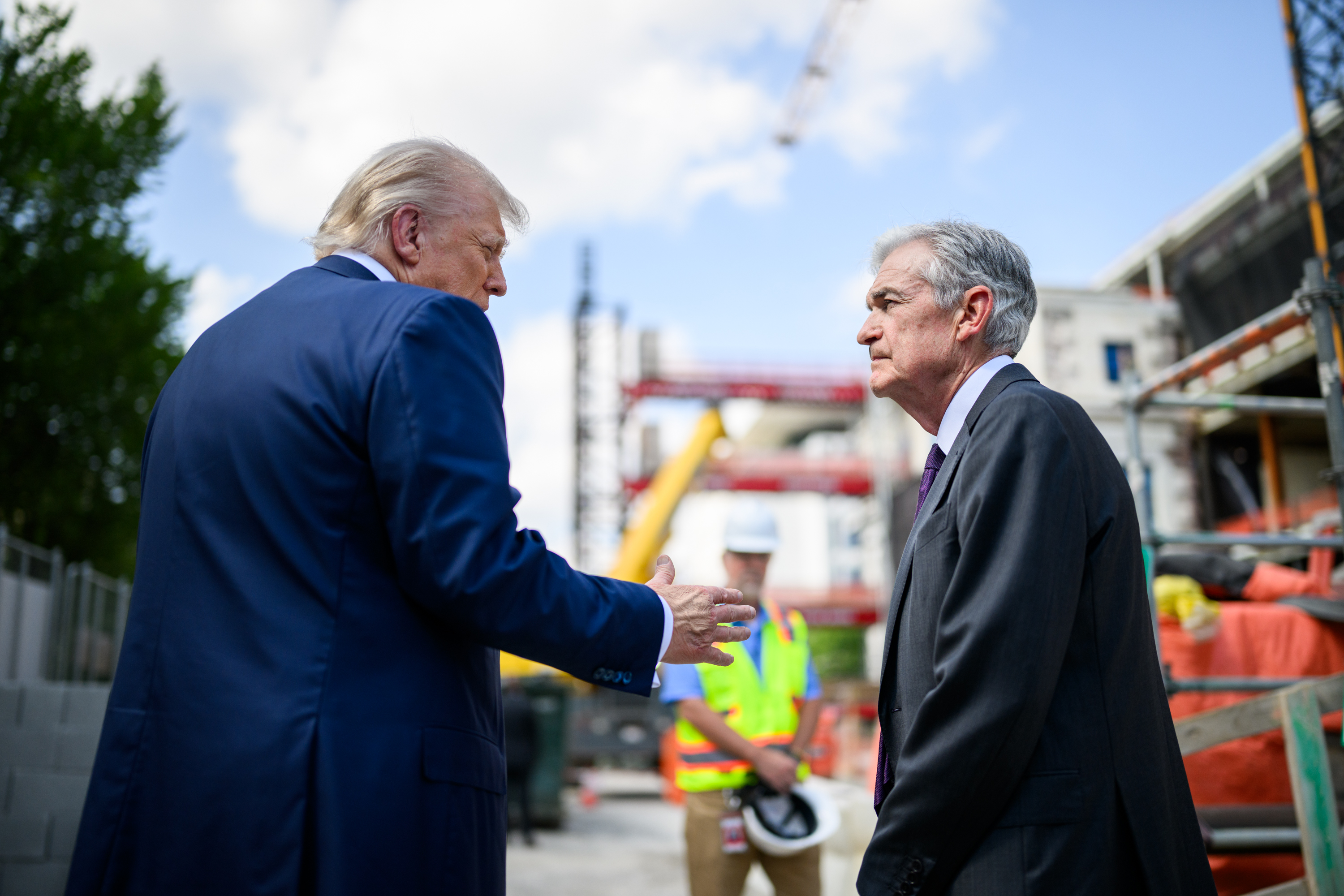
President Trump with Powell during a tour of the Federal Reserve in July 2025

=== Second Trump administration (2025–2026) ===
Trump has expressed disapproval regarding the Fed's maintenance of higher interest rates. When questioned regarding whether the president has the authority to remove a sitting Fed chair, Powell stated that this is "not permitted under the law." In April 2025, Trump posted on Truth Social that "Powell's termination cannot come fast enough!" Legal scholars agree that a sitting Fed Chair cannot be removed without cause. Trump continued to raise the possibility of firing Powell, with varying degrees of urgency. On July 16, 2025, Trump reportedly penned a letter to dismiss Powell as Fed Chair. However, Trump later denied those reports to reporters at the White House. Powell remained as Fed chair pro tempore until Warsh was sworn into office.

In March 2026, he received the Governor of the Year award at the Central Banking Awards 2026.

==== DoJ investigation ====
Statement by Powell about the DoJ investigation

In 2025, Powell became the subject of a federal investigation related to his congressional testimony. In July 2025, Politico reported that Russell Vought, the director of the Office of Management and Budget, was investigating a $2.5 billion renovation to the Eccles Building that could serve as the basis for a "for cause" removal.

On January 11, 2026, Powell stated that the Department of Justice had served the Federal Reserve with grand jury subpoenas two days earlier, threatening a criminal indictment related to his testimony in June 2025 before the Senate Banking Committee, which concerned, in part, a multi-year project to renovate historic Federal Reserve office buildings. Powell issued a press release that stated:

This new threat is not about my testimony last June or about the renovation of the Federal Reserve buildings. It is not about Congress's oversight role; the Fed through testimony and other public disclosures made every effort to keep Congress informed about the renovation project. Those are pretexts. The threat of criminal charges is a consequence of the Federal Reserve setting interest rates based on our best assessment of what will serve the public, rather than following the preferences of the President.

In a joint public statement released the day after Powell announced the subpoenas and investigation, former Federal Reserve Chairs Alan Greenspan, Ben Bernanke, and Janet Yellen, former U.S. Secretaries of the Treasury Henry Paulson, Timothy Geithner, Robert Rubin, and Jacob Lew, economists Glenn Hubbard, Kenneth Rogoff, and Jared Bernstein with others in defense of Powell that argued that the investigation was "an unprecedented attempt to use prosecutorial attacks to undermine [the Federal Reserve's] independence", and that "This is how monetary policy is made in emerging markets with weak institutions, with highly negative consequences for inflation and the functioning of their economies more broadly". In an interview with CNBC, Yellen stated that Trump's demands for the Federal Reserve to cut interest rates to lower interest payments on the national debt "is the road to a banana republic."

On January 12, central bank governors from 11 institutions issued a statement saying they "stand in full solidarity with the Federal Reserve System and its Chair Jerome H Powell'", including heads of the European Central Bank, the Bank of England, the Bank of Canada, the Bank of International Settlements, and the central banks of Sweden, Denmark, Switzerland, South Korea, Australia, and Brazil. The Financial Times called the statement "an unprecedented show of support".

Jerome Powell was the most popular American political official of 13 surveyed, according to a Gallup poll from December. In response to the subpoena announcement, fan edits and AI songs in support of Powell trended on social media. Polling from September 2025 found that 70 percent of Americans thought Trump should not replace Federal Reserve members who disagreed with him.

In response to the investigation announcement, Republican U.S. Senator Thom Tillis, who sits on the Senate Banking Committee, announced that he would oppose any Federal Reserve nomination (including the vacancy of Powell's seat as chair in May 2026) until the legal matter was resolved, stating: "If there were any remaining doubt whether advisers within the Trump Administration are actively pushing to end the independence of the Federal Reserve, there should now be none. It is now the independence and credibility of the Department of Justice that are in question". Republican Senator Lisa Murkowski supported Tillis' blocking all Federal Reserve nominations in response to the investigation, while Republican Senator Kevin Cramer and House Financial Services Committee Chair French Hill also criticized the investigation.

In March 2026, Judge James Boasberg quashed the grand jury subpoenas, writing in his ruling, "There is abundant evidence that the subpoenas’ dominant (if not sole) purpose is to harass and pressure Powell either to yield to the president or to resign and make way for a Fed Chair who will." He continued, "On the other side of the scale, the government has offered no evidence whatsoever that Powell committed any crime other than displeasing the president.”

U.S. Attorney Jeanine Pirro announced in April 2026 that the Department of Justice has dropped the investigation.

== Personal life ==
Powell married Elissa Leonard in 1985 at the Episcopal Washington National Cathedral. They have three children and live in Chevy Chase Village, Maryland, where Elissa is chair of the board of managers of the village. In 2010, Powell was on the board of governors of Chevy Chase Club, a country club.

Based on public filings, as of 2019, Powell's net worth was estimated to be in a range between $20 and $55 million. Powell has served on the boards of charitable and educational institutions including DC Prep, a public charter school, the Bendheim Center for Finance at Princeton University, and The Nature Conservancy. He was also a founder of the Center City Consortium, a group of 16 parochial schools in the poorest areas of Washington, D.C.

Powell is a registered Republican. He is a "Deadhead", a fan of American rock band the Grateful Dead.

In 2026, Powell and the people of the Twin Cities of Minnesota were presented with the John F. Kennedy Profile in Courage Award.

== See also ==
- 2020 stock market crash
- China–United States trade war
- COVID-19 recession
- Financial market impact of the COVID-19 pandemic
- Greenspan put

== Notes ==
Political offices
| Preceded by David W. Mullins Jr. | Assistant Secretary of the Treasury for Financial Institutions; 1990–1992 | Succeeded by John Dugan |
| Preceded by Robert R. Glauber | Under Secretary of the Treasury for Domestic Finance; 1992–1993 | Succeeded by Frank N. Newman |
Government offices
| Preceded by Frederic Mishkin | Member of the Federal Reserve Board of Governors; 2012–present | Incumbent |
| Preceded by Janet Yellen | Chair of the Federal Reserve; 2018–2026 | Succeeded by Kevin Warsh |
