= Andy Baukol =

American politician

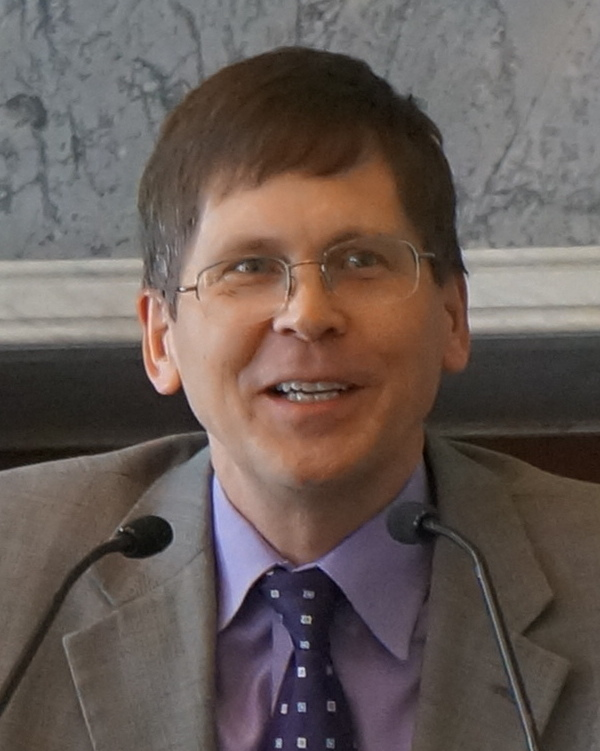

Under Secretary of the Treasury for International Affairs
- Acting; April 2021 – January 13, 2023
- President: Joe Biden
- Preceded by: Brent McIntosh
- Succeeded by: Jay Shambaugh

United States Secretary of the Treasury
- Acting; January 20, 2021 – January 26, 2021
- President: Joe Biden
- Preceded by: Steven Mnuchin
- Succeeded by: Janet Yellen

Personal details
- Education: Georgetown University (BS); University of Minnesota (MA)

Andrew P. Baukol is an American financial policy advisor who served as the acting United States secretary of the treasury for the first week of the Biden administration. Baukol served in an interim capacity until Biden's nominee, Janet Yellen, was confirmed by the United States Senate. He then became Treasury's acting Under Secretary for International Affairs.

Following his retirement from the Treasury Department in November 2023, Baukol joined financial consulting firm Patomak Global Partners.

== Education ==
Baukol earned a Bachelor of Science degree from the Walsh School of Foreign Service at Georgetown University and a Master of Arts in economics from the University of Minnesota.

== Career ==
From 1989 to 1996, Baukol worked for the Central Intelligence Agency as an economic analyst. From 2001 to 2004, he was a senior advisor at the International Monetary Fund. Baukol then joined the United States Department of the Treasury, where he helped manage policy related to the Exchange Stabilization Fund. Baukol also served as principal deputy assistant secretary for international monetary policy. In 2021, then-Treasury Secretary Steven Mnuchin appointed Baukol as the agency's presidential transition director.

Political offices
Preceded by Steve Mnuchin	United States Secretary of Treasury; Acting; 2021	Succeeded by Janet Yellen
