= The Church of Jesus Christ of Latter-day Saints in Washington =

The Church of Jesus Christ of Latter-day Saints in Washington may refer to:

- The Church of Jesus Christ of Latter-day Saints in Washington (state)
- The Church of Jesus Christ of Latter-day Saints in Washington, D.C.
