= The Church of Jesus Christ of Latter-day Saints in Washington, D.C. =

The Church of Jesus Christ of Latter-day Saints in the District of Columbia
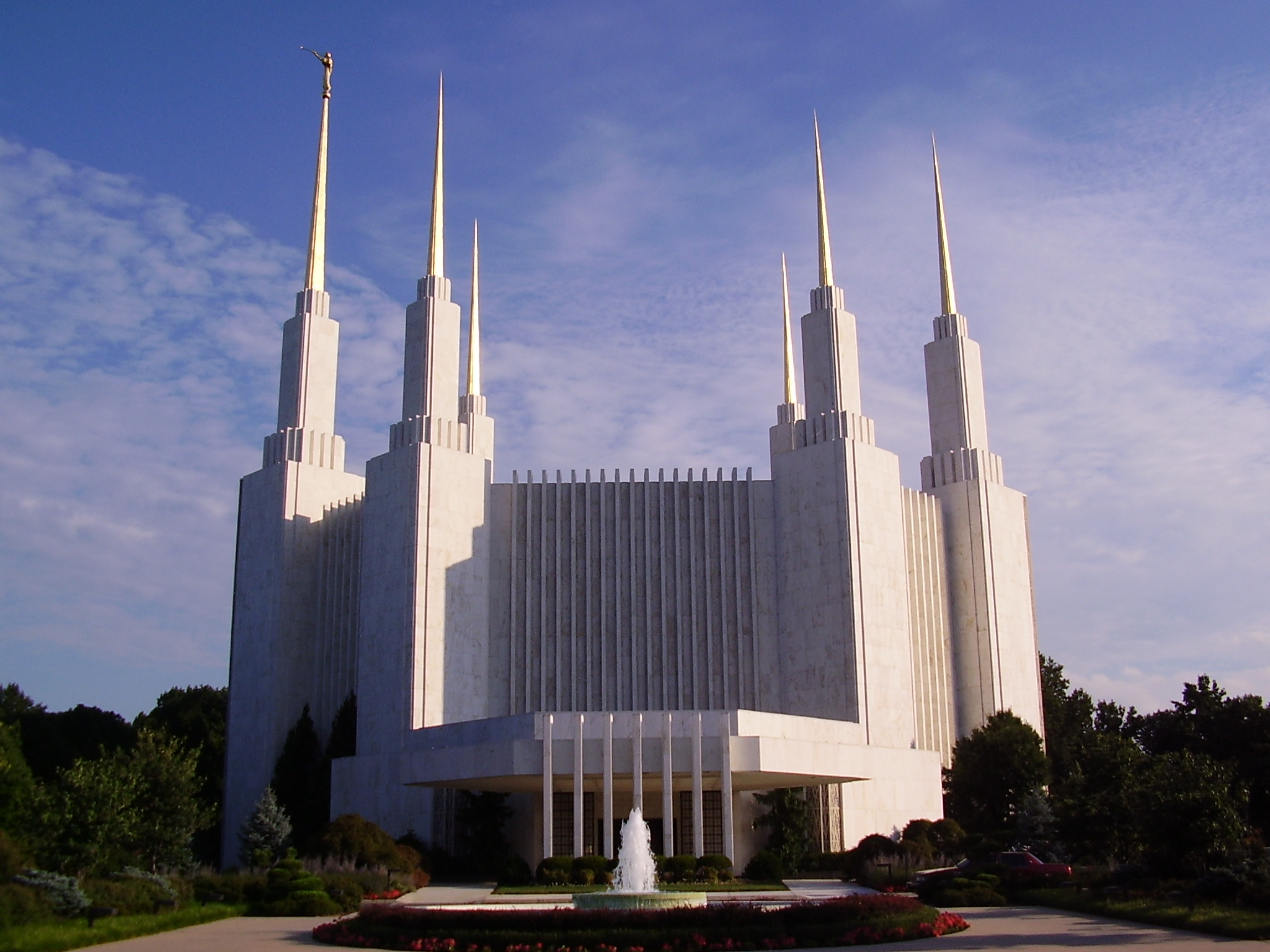
- The Washington D.C. Temple
- Area: US Northeast
- Members: 3,648 (2025)
- Wards: 4
- FamilySearch Centers: 1

The Church of Jesus Christ of Latter-day Saints in Washington, D.C. refers to the Church of Jesus Christ of Latter-day Saints (LDS Church) and its members in Washington, D.C.. Official church membership represented approximately 0.38% of the general population in 2014. According to the 2014 Pew Forum on Religion & Public Life survey, roughly 1% of Washingtonians self-identified most closely with The Church of Jesus Christ of Latter-day Saints.

== History ==
Membership in the District of Columbia
Year	Membership
1974	620
1989*	500
1999	1,160
2009	2,200
2019	3,144
2025	3,648
*Membership was published as a rounded number. Source: Wendall J. Ashton; Jim M. Wall, Deseret News, various years, Church Almanac State Information: District of Columbia

In 1933, a large granite chapel was completed in the Washington, D.C., area. The area had originally established laws prohibiting the practice of activities in the branch, beginning in the 19th century. Even after plural marriage was stopped in the Church, prejudice against the Church was still commonly present in the D.C. area.

After construction of the famous temple, which was originally topped with a statue of Angel Moroni, more attention was given to the church in that area.

== Congregations ==
Congregations that meet in the District of Columbia

As of July 2026, the following congregations meet within the District of Columbia:

- Capitol Hill Ward (English)
- Chevy Chase Ward (English)
- Eastern Market YSA Ward
- Foggy Bottom YSA Ward
- Mount Pleasant Ward (Spanish)
- Washington DC Ward (Sign Language)
- Washington DC 3rd Ward (English)

Other congregations that serve the District of Columbia

Congregations meeting outside the District of Columbia that serve those in the District:

- Falls Church 2nd Branch (Persian)
- Montgomery Branch (Mandarin)
- Potomac SA Ward
- Takoma Park Branch (French)

== Temples ==
On November 19, 1974, the Washington D.C. Temple was dedicated by church president Spencer W. Kimball. Despite its name, the temple is not located within the District of Columbia; it is located in Kensington, Maryland, approximately three miles north of the city limits.

16. Washington D.C. Temple; Official website; News & images	
Location: Announced: Groundbreaking: Dedicated: Rededicated: Size:	Kensington, Maryland, United States; November 15, 1968 by David O. McKay; December 7, 1968 by Hugh B. Brown; November 19, 1974 by Spencer W. Kimball; August 14, 2022 by Russell M. Nelson; 156,558 sq ft (14,544.7 m^{2}) on a 52-acre (21 ha) site - designed by Fred L. Markham, Harold K. Beecher, Henry P. Fetzer, and Keith W. Wilcox

== Meetinghouses ==
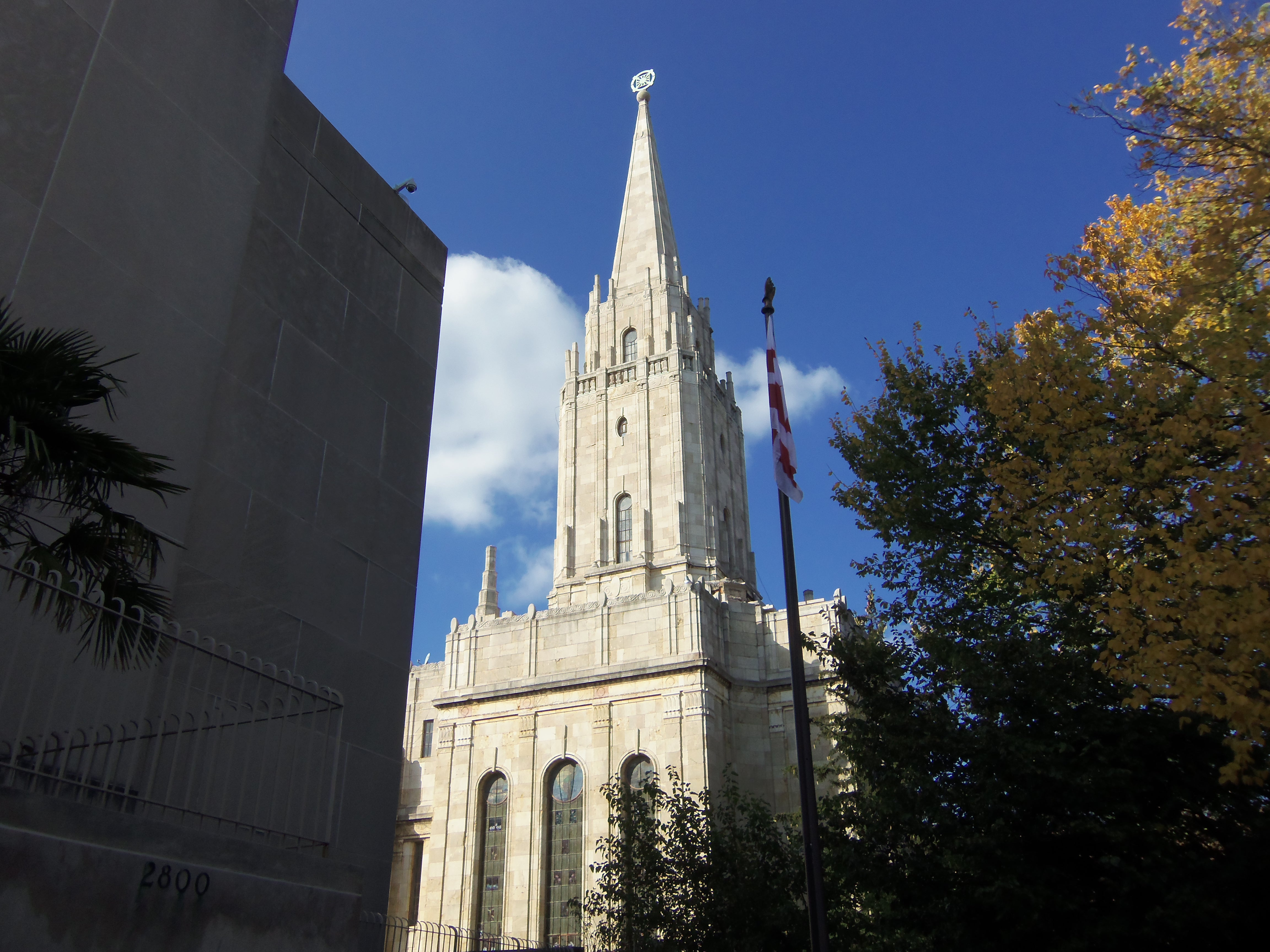
The Unification Church (1931-33, Young and Hansen) at 2810 16th Street NW, formerly the Washington Chapel, Church of Jesus Christ of Latter-Day Saints.

Unification Church, Formally Washington Chapel of the Church of Jesus Christ of Latter-day Saints

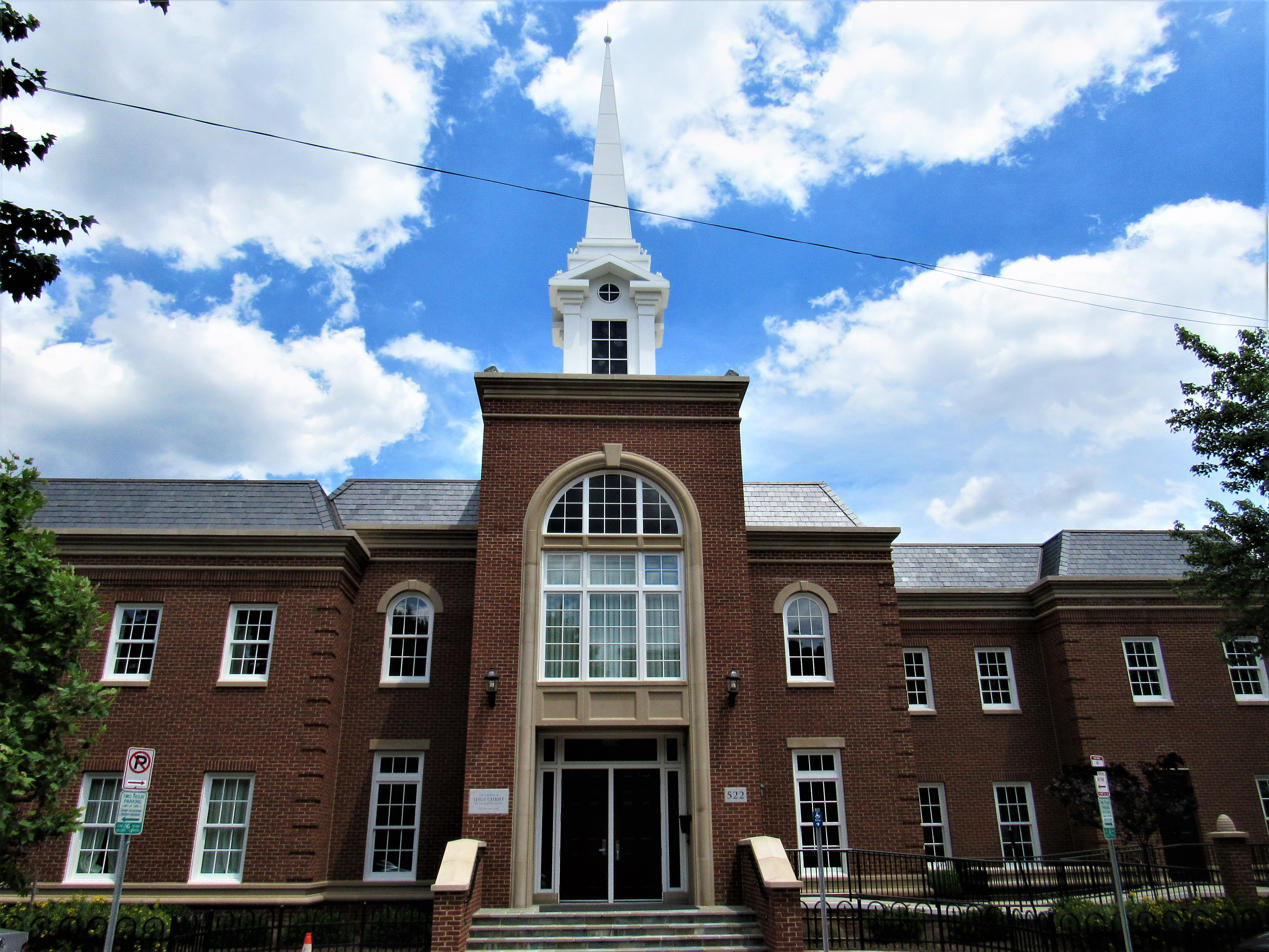
The Church of Jesus Christ of Latter Day Saints on 7th Street SE in Washington, D.C.

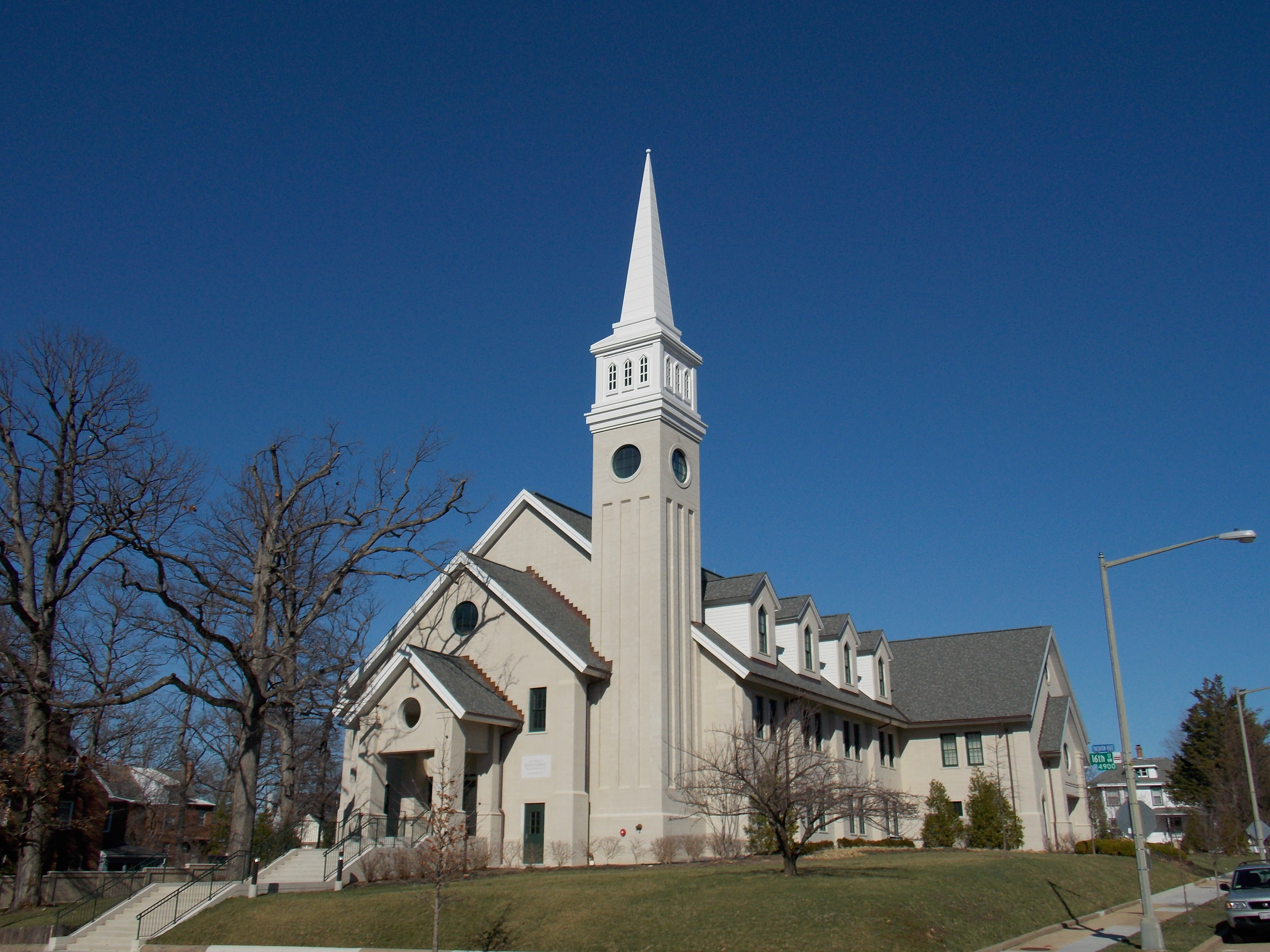
A meetinghouse of The Church of Jesus Christ of Latter-day Saints on 16th Street NW, Washington, D.C.

== See also ==
- Washington DC LDS Stake
