= Meg Lundsager =

Meg Lundsager has been since 2007 the executive director for the United States portion of the International Monetary Fund. The US votes in this forum are listed on a Treasury webpage, and are especially useful because the votes are linked with the press releases of the IMF announcements.

== Biography ==
From government website:

Meg Lundsager currently represents the United States as the Executive Director at the International Monetary Fund. In this capacity she casts the U.S. vote at the IMF Board of Directors and works closely with Fund staff, management and U.S. Government officials to develop and implement IMF policies.

As Deputy Assistant Secretary for Trade and Investment at the U.S. Treasury Department from 1996-2000, Ms. Lundsager led teams negotiating WTO financial services agreements, including with acceding countries, and chaired bilateral financial sector dialogues. She also negotiated investment agreements and led the interagency team overseeing export credits agreements in the OECD. She directed U.S. Treasury efforts to develop USG positions on trade and investment matters across the range of multilateral and bilateral initiatives and issues.

Ms. Lundsager was named an Atlantic Fellow (1995-1996) and spent a year researching portfolio allocation decision making while at the London School of Economics. Previous responsibilities at the Treasury included Director of the Office of Asian and Middle Eastern/North African Nations (1991-1995) and Special Assistant to the Under Secretary for International Affairs (1987-1990). Ms. Lundsager also served as a Director on the National Security Council staff from 1990-1991 and as an assistant to the U.S. Executive Director at the IMF in the 1980s.

She began her government career at the Treasury Department as a desk officer covering Asian developing countries including Korea, Indonesia, and India.

Ms. Lundsager graduated from the American University and completed her MA as well as course work and PhD exams at the University of Maryland.

She is married with two children and resides in Virginia.
