= David Malpass =

American economist and official (born 1956)

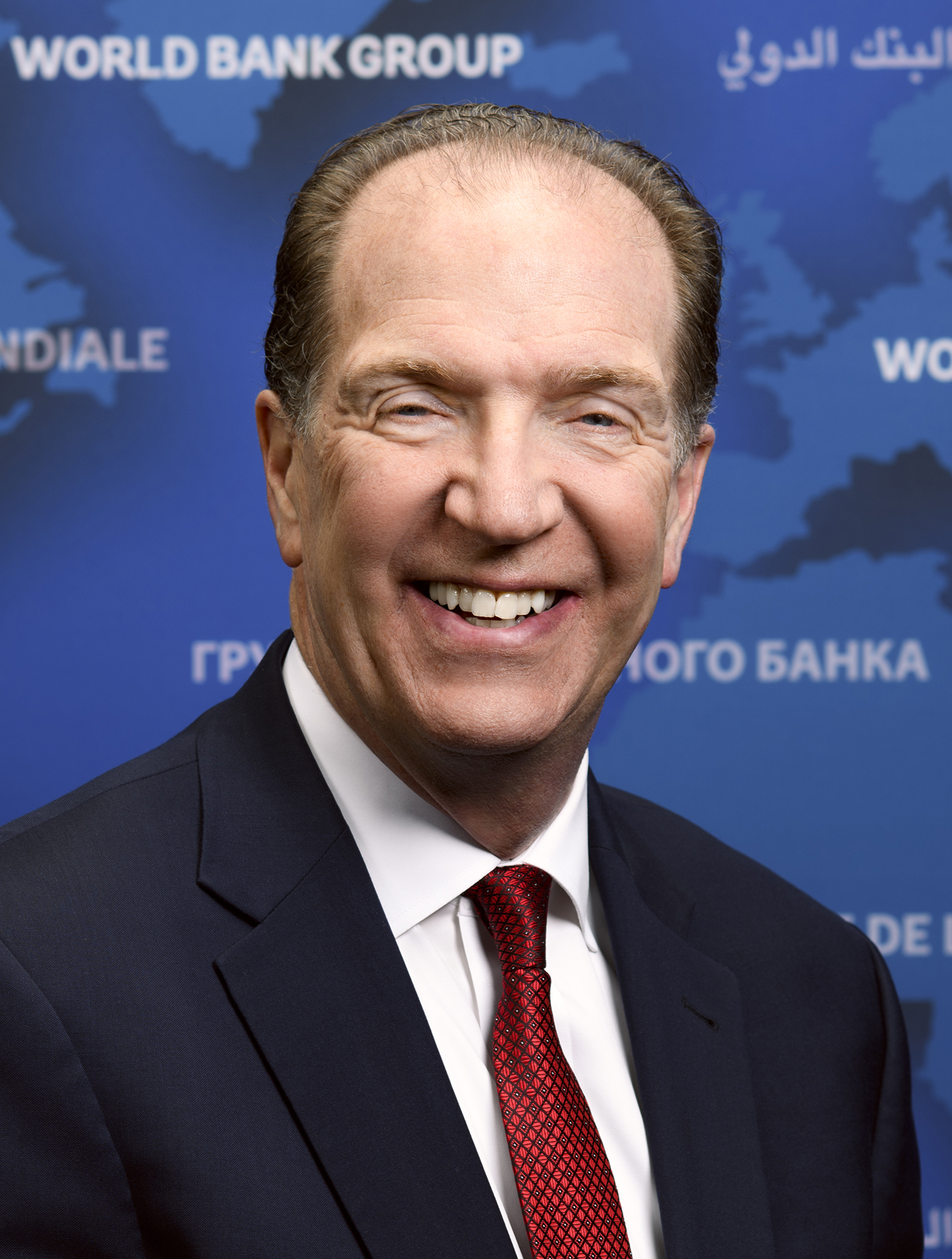
- Malpass in 2019

13th President of the World Bank Group
- In office April 9, 2019 – June 1, 2023
- Chief Executive: Kristalina Georgieva; Anshula Kant
- Preceded by: Kristalina Georgieva (acting)
- Succeeded by: Ajay Banga

Under Secretary of the Treasury for International Affairs
- In office September 25, 2017 – April 9, 2019
- President: Donald Trump
- Preceded by: D. Nathan Sheets
- Succeeded by: Brent McIntosh

Personal details
- Born: March 8, 1956 (age 70) Petoskey, Michigan, U.S
- Party: Republican
- Spouse: Adele Obermayer
- Children: 4
- Relatives: Herman Obermayer (father-in-law)
- Education: Colorado College (BA); University of Denver (MBA)

David Robert Malpass (born March 8, 1956) is an American economic analyst and former government official who served as President of the World Bank Group from 2019 to 2023. He previously served as Under Secretary of the Treasury for International Affairs under Donald Trump, having served as an economic advisor to Trump during the 2016 U.S. presidential election; Deputy Assistant Treasury Secretary under Ronald Reagan; and Deputy Assistant Secretary of State under George H. W. Bush. He was chief international economist at Bear Stearns from 1993 to 2002, and chief economist from 2002 to the firm's collapse in 2008.

As of 2024, Malpass is Distinguished Fellow of International Finance at the Daniels School of Business at Purdue University.

== Early life and education ==
Malpass was born in 1956 in Petoskey, Michigan.

He earned a BA in physics at Colorado College in 1976, and an MBA at the University of Denver in 1978. In 1983, he was a mid-career fellow studying international economics at Georgetown University's School of Foreign Service.

== Career ==
=== Early career ===
From 1976 to 1981, Malpass worked in Portland, Oregon, as a contract administrator for Esco Corporation, a computer systems consultant for Arthur Andersen, and controller/CFO for Consolidated Supply.

=== Economist ===
From 1984 through 1993, in the Reagan and George H. W. Bush administrations, Malpass worked on an array of economic, budget, and foreign policy issues including the 1986 tax cut, NAFTA, and the Brady Plan for Latin American debt. From 1984 to 1986, he was Senior Analyst for Taxes and Trade and International Economist of the Senate Budget Committee. At the U.S. Treasury Department, he was Legislative Manager from 1986 to 1988, and Deputy Assistant Secretary of Developing Nations 1988 to 1989. He was Republican staff director of the United States Congress Joint Economic Committee from 1989 to 1990. At the U.S. State Department, he was Deputy Assistant Secretary of Latin America Economic Affairs from 1990 to 1993.

Malpass was chief international economist at Bear Stearns from 1993 to 2002. From 2002 to 2008, he was chief economist at the firm.

After Bear Stearns failed during the 2008 financial crisis, Malpass founded Encima Global. He ran for the Republican nomination for United States Senate in the 2010 United States Senate special election in New York; he placed second in the three-way primary with 38% of the vote after former Congressman Joe DioGuardi's 42%. In 2012, he wrote a chapter titled "Sound Money, Sound Policy" in The 4% Solution: Unleashing the Economic Growth America Needs, published by the George W. Bush Presidential Center.

Malpass has written regularly for Forbes and has been a contributor to the op-ed section of The Wall Street Journal. He is also a frequent television commentator.

In August 2007, before the housing market collapse that triggered the 2008 financial crisis, Malpass wrote in an op-ed for The Wall Street Journal that "Housing and debt markets are not that big a part of the U.S. economy, or of job creation ... the housing- and debt-market corrections will probably add to the length of the U.S. economic expansion." In 2012, in the New York Times Economix blog, Bruce Bartlett cited Malpass's mid-2008 forecast of economic growth and his September 2012 forecast of recession as examples of partisan bias in economic forecasts.

During the Obama administration, Malpass frequently warned against quantitative easing, the preferred approach of the Federal Reserve during that time period; he said that it would inhibit growth.

=== Trump advisor ===
On August 5, 2016, Malpass was announced as a senior economic advisor the Donald Trump 2016 presidential campaign. He appeared on television and radio to support Trump's message of faster growth through policy reforms. Four of his pre-election Forbes columns discussed the need for political reform or upheaval. His September 1, 2016 op-ed in The New York Times, "Why This Economy Needs Donald Trump", described potential faster growth through a policy upheaval covering economic policy, taxes, trade, and regulations. After the election, Malpass headed the transition team's work on economic policy and the Treasury Department.

=== Under Secretary of the Treasury ===
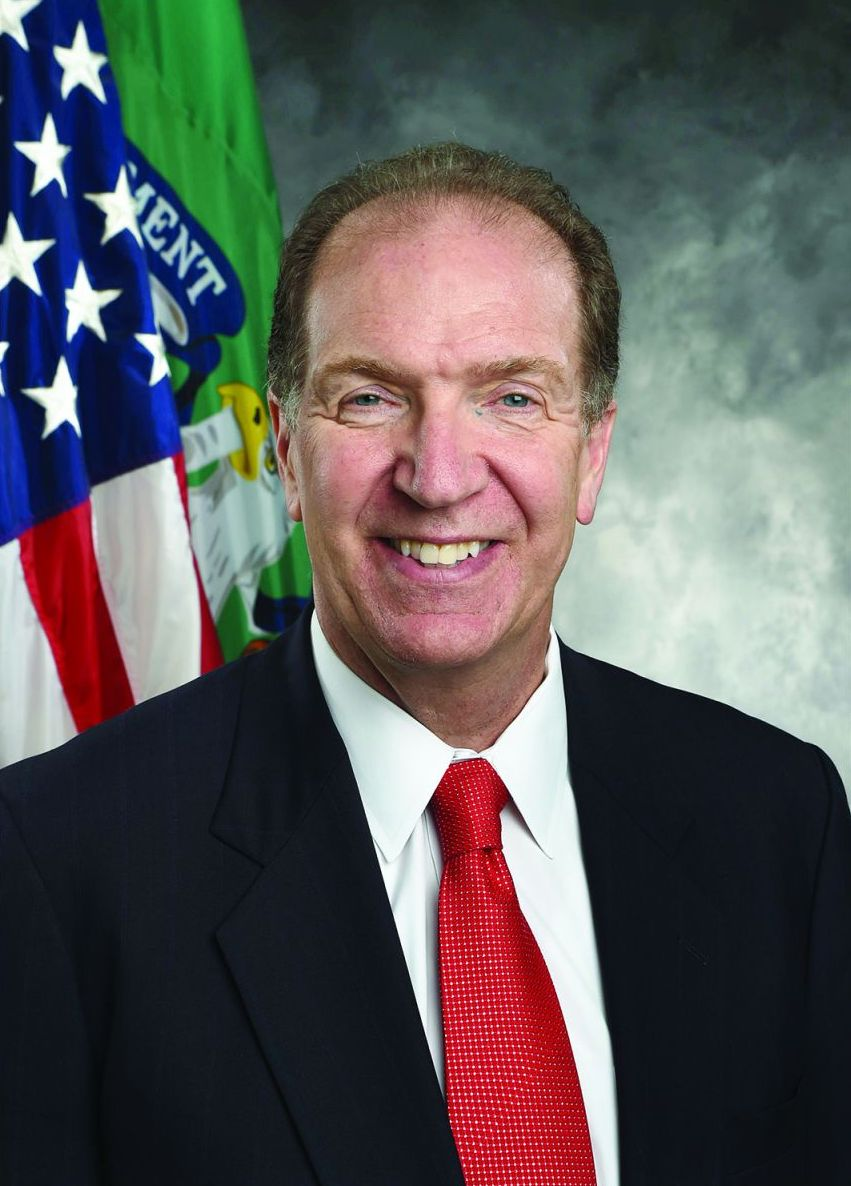
Malpass's official photo as Under Secretary

In March 2017, the White House announced Malpass as President Trump's nominee for Under Secretary of the Treasury for International Affairs. Malpass was confirmed for the position by the United States Senate on August 3, 2017.

Malpass took a critical position on China during his tenure. In July 2018, he was described by Bloomberg News as "a champion of President Donald Trump's protectionist message".

=== World Bank President ===
In February 2019, Trump announced Malpass as the nominee for President of the World Bank, succeeding Jim Yong Kim, who had announced in January 2019 that he would be stepping down three years prior to the end of his second five-year term. Malpass was unanimously approved by the executive board on April 5, 2019, and began his term on April 9. During the start of his tenure, Malpass focused in his early public comments on the global economy and debt transparency.

Malpass spent a year realigning the World Bank's staff to better meet client countries' real needs. He also stabilized the institution, and reorganized the disarray that had been left by his predecessor, Kim. By the end of 2022 he had nearly doubled the bank's lending from what it had been when he took over. By the end of 2022 he had also doubled its climate financing, and oversaw a growing portfolio of loans designed to help countries adapt to climate change and transition to renewable power.

During his tenure, he led the World Bank in lending more than $150 billion in response to the COVID-19 pandemic, the Russian invasion of Ukraine, and rising food and energy prices. He also helped low-income countries achieve debt sustainability through debt reduction, and pressured China to provide more debt relief for developing nations.

In his first two years as World Bank president, he treaded carefully when discussing the causes of global warming. After the inauguration of Joe Biden in early 2021, American policy shifted towards prioritizing efforts against climate change, and Malpass increasingly began working and speaking on climate policy. In April 2021, the World Bank released a five-year Climate Change Action Plan that pledged 35% of World Bank financing to climate co-benefits and 50% of its climate financing to climate change adaptation, and pledged to fully align the World Bank's financing goals with the Paris Agreement by 2023. The plan was praised, with some concern that 35% could be too low or that the plan did not halt all World Bank fossil fuel projects.

On September 20, 2022, former U.S. vice president and environmentalist Al Gore labelled Malpass a climate change denier and called for Biden to replace him during an event focusing on climate change hosted by The New York Times. Appearing separately from Gore at the event, Malpass was asked three times by journalist David Gelles if he accepted the scientific consensus on climate change that "the man-made burning of fossil fuels is rapidly and dangerously warming the planet"; Malpass replied, "I'm not a scientist." This answer prompted criticism from climate policy makers such as Rachel Kyte and Mark Carney, and calls for his resignation from the Rocky Mountain Institute and Christiana Figueres, among others. On September 21, the United States Department of the Treasury issued a statement that it expected World Bank leadership to take a leading role on climate issues. On September 22, Malpass said in both an internal memo to World Bank staff and on an interview with CNN International that he accepted the scientific consensus on human activity causing climate change and that he was not a "denier".

In mid-February 2023, Malpass announced his intention to end his term as president of the bank by the end of the bank's fiscal year in June 2023.

== Additional posts ==
In 2024, Malpass became Distinguished Fellow of International Finance at the Daniels School of Business at Purdue University, and the inaugural Fellow of Global Business and Infrastructure at Purdue@DC.

Malpass is on the board of trustees of UBS Investment Trust.

He is a former member of the board of directors of the National Committee on United States–China Relations, the Council of the Americas, and the Economic Club of New York, and a former member of the board of trustees of the Manhattan Institute. He was also formerly a member of board of directors of the New Mountain Financial Corporation.

== Personal life ==
Malpass and his wife Adele live in Washington, D.C. and have four children.

Adele Malpass is the daughter of Herman Obermayer. She was appointed as the chairwoman of the Manhattan Republican Party in January 2015 and was elected to a two-year term in September 2015. She resigned in August 2017 to move to Washington when Malpass was appointed to his role in the Treasury Department under President Trump. As of 2022, she was the president of The Daily Caller News Foundation, a non-profit organization linked with the eponymous news organization.

Malpass speaks Spanish, Russian, and French.

Political offices
Preceded by D. Nathan Sheets	Under Secretary of the Treasury for International Affairs; 2017–2019	Succeeded by Brent McIntosh
Diplomatic posts
Preceded by Kristalina Georgieva; Acting	President of the World Bank Group; 2019–2023	Succeeded by Ajay Banga
