= D. Nathan Sheets =

American economist and government official

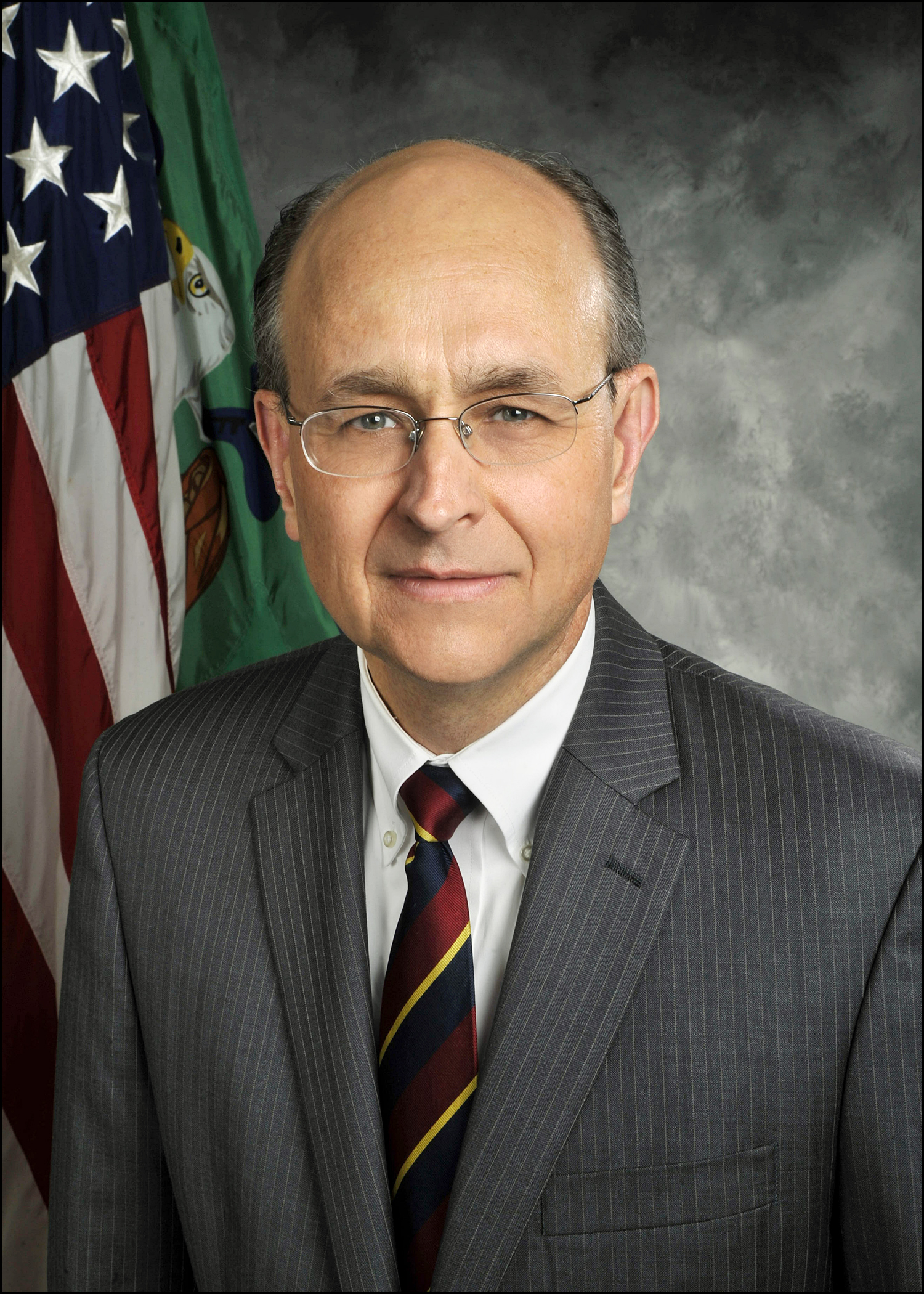

Under Secretary of the Treasury for International Affairs
- In office September 18, 2014 – January 20, 2017
- President: Barack Obama
- Preceded by: Lael Brainard
- Succeeded by: David Malpass

Personal details
- Born: December 23, 1964 (age 61) Salt Lake City, Utah, U.S.
- Education: Brigham Young University (BA); Massachusetts Institute of Technology (PhD)

D. Nathan Sheets is an American economist and government official who served as the under secretary of the treasury for international affairs from 2014 to 2017. He has been Global Chief Economist at Citigroup since October 2021.

== Early life and education ==
In his youth, Sheets was the recipient of a National Science Foundation Fellowship.

== Career ==
From September 2014 to January 2017, Sheets served as the under secretary of the treasury for international affairs at the Department of the Treasury, serving as the principal advisor to the secretary of the treasury on international economic issues. He was nominated by U.S. President Barack Obama on February 12, 2014, The United States Senate confirmed him unanimously on September 18, 2014. Before working at the United States Department of the Treasury, he worked as the Global Head of International Economics at Citigroup. There, he produced economic commentary on current events, and the developing global economy. Prior to his years at Citigroup, he worked at the Federal Reserve for 18 years, in many positions, which included serving for nearly four years as the director of the Division of International Finance from September 2007, until August 2011. He was a visiting fellow at the Peterson Institute for International Economics from February to June 2017 and Chief Economist and Head of Global Macroeconomic Research at PGIM Fixed Income from July 2017 to October 2021.

Sheets has served as Stake President of the Washington, D.C. Stake for the Church of Jesus Christ of Latter-day Saints since March 11, 2018.
