= Brent McIntosh =

American attorney (born 1973)

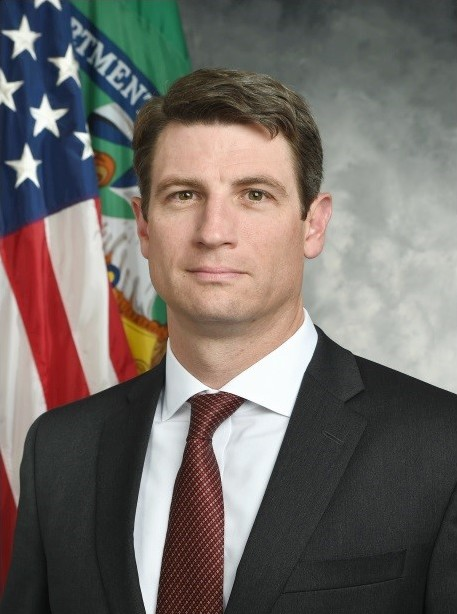

Under Secretary of the Treasury for International Affairs
- In office September 2019 – January 20, 2021
- President: Donald Trump
- Preceded by: David Malpass
- Succeeded by: Jay Shambaugh

General Counsel of the United States Department of the Treasury
- In office September 25, 2017 – July 2019
- President: Donald Trump
- Preceded by: Christopher J. Meade
- Succeeded by: Brian Callanan

White House Deputy Staff Secretary
- In office February 12, 2007 – January 20, 2009
- President: George W. Bush
- Preceded by: William A. Burck
- Succeeded by: Peter Rundlet

Personal details
- Born: Brent James McIntosh; September 28, 1973 (age 53) Lansing, Michigan, U.S.
- Education: University of Michigan (BA); Yale Law School (JD)

Brent James McIntosh is an American attorney who served as Under Secretary of the Treasury for International Affairs from 2019 to 2021. He previously served as General Counsel of the United States Treasury. Prior to his government service, McIntosh was a partner at Sullivan & Cromwell and was co-head of the firm's cybersecurity practice. Mcintosh is now Citigroup's Chief Legal Officer & Corporate Secretary.

== Early life and education ==
McIntosh was born in Lansing, Michigan, and raised in Williamston.

He received his undergraduate degree in economics and political science from the University of Michigan and his J.D. from Yale Law School. He was a law clerk to Judge Dennis Jacobs of the United States Court of Appeals for the Second Circuit and Judge Laurence Silberman of the United States Court of Appeals for the District of Columbia Circuit.

== Career ==
=== Sullivan & Cromwell ===
After his clerkships, he was an associate at Sullivan & Cromwell from 2001 to 2004. He returned to the firm in 2011 and became a partner.

=== Department of Justice and White House ===
From 2004 to 2006, he worked at the Office of Legal Policy at the United States Department of Justice, serving in part as a deputy assistant attorney general. He was an associate counsel to President George W. Bush from 2006 to 2009, as well as a deputy assistant to the president and deputy staff secretary.

=== U.S. Department of the Treasury ===
In May 2019, President Trump nominated McIntosh to be Under Secretary of the Treasury for International Affairs. The U.S. Senate confirmed him on September 18, 2019, by a vote of 54–38. In March 2020, he was the Treasury Department official overseeing several programs providing unprecedented financial assistance to the U.S. airline industry during the COVID-19 pandemic.

Following his stint at Treasury, McIntosh joined the Council on Foreign Relations as an adjunct senior fellow for international economics and finance.

=== Citigroup ===
On September 27, Citigroup named McIntosh as its new Chief Legal Officer & Corporate Secretary. At Citigroup, McIntosh leads banks's Global Legal Affairs & Compliance organization, which includes the Legal Department, Independent Compliance Risk Management, Citi Security and Investigative Services and Citi's Regulatory Strategy and Policy function.

=== Civil Society ===
McIntosh is a member of the International Institute for Strategic Studies, the Alexander Hamilton Society, the American Society of International Law, the Bretton Woods Committee, and the Federalist Society. The New York Law Journal named him a "rising star" in 2013.

== Personal life ==
In 2001, McIntosh married Laura Ahn, an attorney. The two met at Yale Law School, where Ahn was the editor-in-chief of the Yale Law Journal and McIntosh was an articles editor. Ahn worked as an associate at Wachtell, Lipton, Rosen & Katz and is now a consulting attorney for the firm, specializing in corporate law.
