= United States Secretary of the Treasury =

Head of the Department of the Treasury

- Seal of the Department of the Treasury

- Flag of the secretary

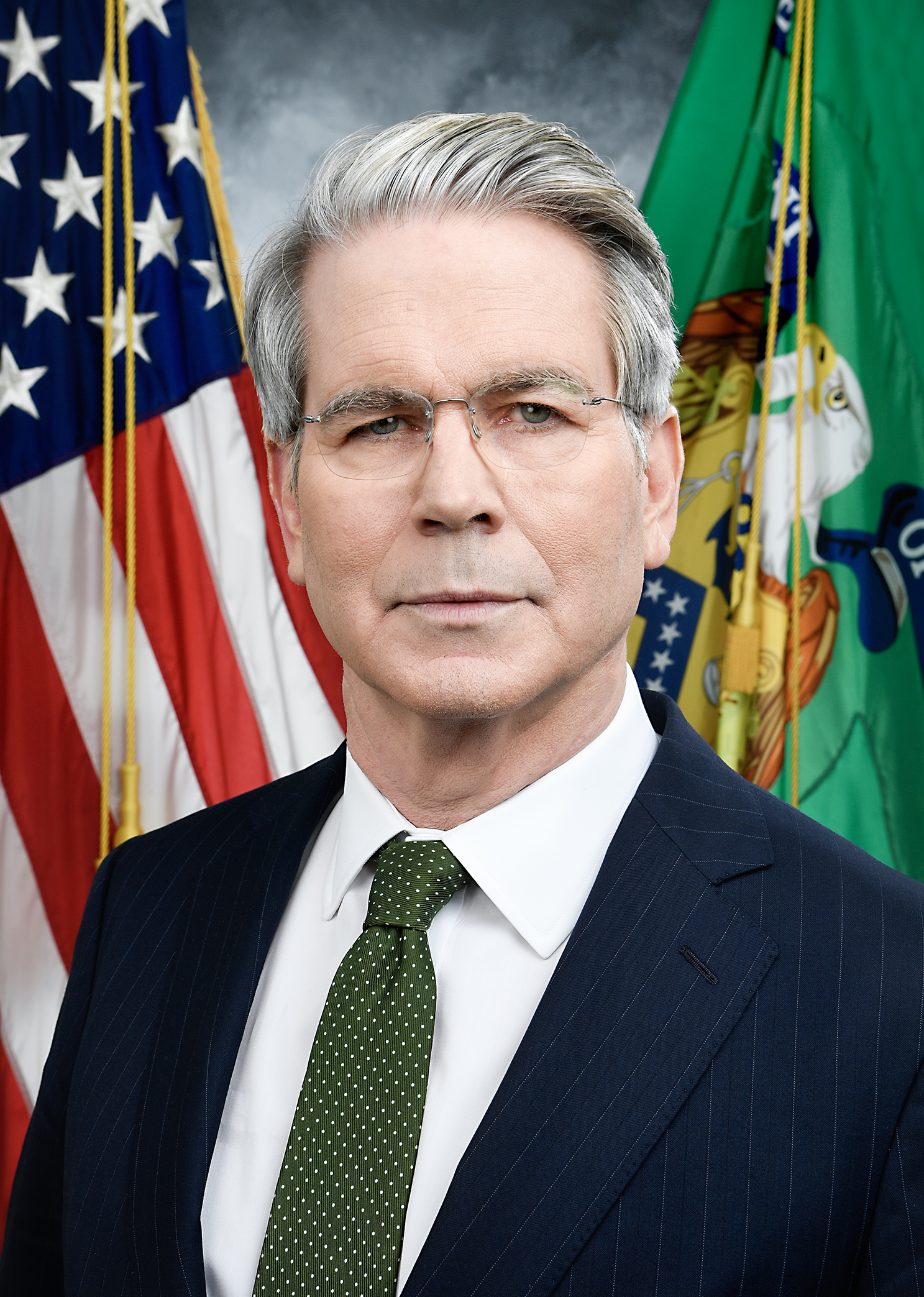
- Incumbent; Scott Bessent since January 28, 2025
- Department of the Treasury
- Style: Mr. Secretary (informal); The Honorable (formal)
- Member of: Cabinet; National Security Council
- Reports to: President of the United States
- Seat: Treasury Building, Washington, D.C.
- Appointer: The president; with advice and consent of the Senate
- Term length: No fixed term
- Constituting instrument: 31 U.S.C. § 301
- Precursor: Superintendent of Finance
- Formation: September 11, 1789; 237 years ago
- First holder: Alexander Hamilton
- Succession: Fifth
- Deputy: Deputy Secretary
- Salary: Executive Schedule, Level I
- Website: treasury.gov

The United States secretary of the treasury is the head of the United States Department of the Treasury, and is the chief financial officer of the federal government of the United States. The secretary of the treasury serves as the principal advisor to the president of the United States on all matters pertaining to economic and fiscal policy. The secretary is, by custom, a member of the president's cabinet and, by law, a member of the National Security Council, and fifth in the U.S. presidential line of succession.

Under the Appointments Clause of the United States Constitution, the officeholder is nominated by the president of the United States, and, following a confirmation hearing before the Senate Committee on Finance, will take the office if confirmed by the majority of the full United States Senate.

The secretary of state, the secretary of the treasury, the secretary of defense, and the attorney general are generally regarded as the four most important Cabinet officials, due to the size and importance of their respective departments. The current secretary of the treasury has been Scott Bessent since January 28, 2025.

== Powers and functions ==
The secretary is responsible for formulating and recommending domestic and international financial, economic, and tax policy, participating in the formulation of broad fiscal policies that have general significance for the economy, and managing the public debt. The secretary oversees the activities of the department in carrying out its major law enforcement responsibilities; in serving as the financial agent for the United States government; and in manufacturing coins and currency. As the chief financial officer of the government, the secretary serves as chairman pro tempore of the President's Economic Policy Council, chairman of the boards and managing trustee of the Social Security and Medicare Trust Funds, and as U.S. Governor of the International Monetary Fund, the International Bank for Reconstruction and Development, the Inter-American Development Bank, the Asian Development Bank, and the European Bank for Reconstruction and Development.

— U.S. Department of the Treasury website

The secretary along with the treasurer of the United States must sign Federal Reserve notes before they can become legal tender. The secretary also manages the United States Emergency Economic Stabilization fund.

== Salary ==
The secretary of the treasury is a Level I position in the Executive Schedule, thus earning the salary prescribed for that level ($250,600 as of January 2024).

== List of secretaries of the treasury ==
Parties

Federalist (4) Democratic-Republican (4) Democratic (30) Whig (5) Republican (35) Independent (1)

Status

Denotes an acting secretary of the treasury

No.	Portrait	Name	State of residence	Took office	Left office	President(s)
1		Alexander Hamilton	New York	September 11, 1789	January 31, 1795	George Washington (1789–1797)
2		Oliver Wolcott Jr.	Connecticut	February 3, 1795	December 31, 1800	George Washington (1789–1797)
2		Oliver Wolcott Jr.	Connecticut	February 3, 1795	December 31, 1800	John Adams (1797–1801)
3		Samuel Dexter	Massachusetts	January 1, 1801	May 13, 1801	John Adams (1797–1801)
3		Samuel Dexter	Massachusetts	January 1, 1801	May 13, 1801	Thomas Jefferson (1801–1809)
4		Albert Gallatin	Pennsylvania	May 14, 1801	February 8, 1814	James Madison (1809–1817)
5		George W. Campbell	Tennessee	February 9, 1814	October 5, 1814	James Madison (1809–1817)
6		Alexander Dallas	Pennsylvania	October 6, 1814	October 21, 1816	James Madison (1809–1817)
–		William Jones; Acting (Note: As Secretary of the Navy.)	Pennsylvania	October 21, 1816	October 22, 1816	James Madison (1809–1817)
7		William H. Crawford	Georgia	October 22, 1816	March 6, 1825	James Madison (1809–1817)
7		William H. Crawford	Georgia	October 22, 1816	March 6, 1825	James Monroe (1817–1825)
8		Richard Rush	Pennsylvania	March 7, 1825	March 5, 1829	John Quincy Adams (1825–1829)
9		Samuel D. Ingham	Pennsylvania	March 6, 1829	June 20, 1831	Andrew Jackson (1829–1837)
10		Louis McLane	Delaware	August 8, 1831	May 28, 1833	Andrew Jackson (1829–1837)
11		William J. Duane	Pennsylvania	May 29, 1833	September 22, 1833	Andrew Jackson (1829–1837)
12		Roger B. Taney	Maryland	September 23, 1833	June 25, 1834	Andrew Jackson (1829–1837)
13		Levi Woodbury	New Hampshire	July 1, 1834	March 3, 1841	Andrew Jackson (1829–1837)
13		Levi Woodbury	New Hampshire	July 1, 1834	March 3, 1841	Martin Van Buren (1837–1841)
14		Thomas Ewing	Ohio	March 4, 1841	September 11, 1841	William Henry Harrison (1841)
14		Thomas Ewing	Ohio	March 4, 1841	September 11, 1841	John Tyler (1841–1845)
15		Walter Forward	Pennsylvania	September 13, 1841	March 1, 1843	John Tyler (1841–1845)
16		John Canfield Spencer	New York	March 8, 1843	May 2, 1844	John Tyler (1841–1845)
17		George M. Bibb	Kentucky	July 4, 1844	March 7, 1845	John Tyler (1841–1845)
18		Robert J. Walker	Mississippi	March 8, 1845	March 5, 1849	James K. Polk (1845–1849)
19		William M. Meredith	Pennsylvania	March 8, 1849	July 22, 1850	Zachary Taylor (1849–1850)
20		Thomas Corwin	Ohio	July 23, 1850	March 6, 1853	Millard Fillmore (1850–1853)
21		James Guthrie	Kentucky	March 7, 1853	March 6, 1857	Franklin Pierce (1853–1857)
22		Howell Cobb	Georgia	March 7, 1857	December 8, 1860	James Buchanan (1857–1861)
23		Philip Francis Thomas	Maryland	December 12, 1860	January 14, 1861	James Buchanan (1857–1861)
24		John Adams Dix	New York	January 15, 1861	March 6, 1861	James Buchanan (1857–1861)
25		Salmon P. Chase	Ohio	March 7, 1861	June 30, 1864	Abraham Lincoln (1861–1865)
26		William P. Fessenden	Maine	July 5, 1864	March 3, 1865	Abraham Lincoln (1861–1865)
27		Hugh McCulloch	Indiana	March 9, 1865	March 3, 1869	Abraham Lincoln (1861–1865)
27		Hugh McCulloch	Indiana	March 9, 1865	March 3, 1869	Andrew Johnson (1865–1869)
28		George S. Boutwell	Massachusetts	March 12, 1869	March 16, 1873	Ulysses S. Grant (1869–1877)
29		William Adams Richardson	Massachusetts	March 17, 1873	June 3, 1874	Ulysses S. Grant (1869–1877)
30		Benjamin Bristow	Kentucky	June 4, 1874	June 20, 1876	Ulysses S. Grant (1869–1877)
31		Lot M. Morrill	Maine	July 7, 1876	March 9, 1877	Ulysses S. Grant (1869–1877)
32		John Sherman	Ohio	March 10, 1877	March 3, 1881	Rutherford B. Hayes (1877–1881)
33		William Windom	Minnesota	March 8, 1881	November 13, 1881	James A. Garfield (1881)
33		William Windom	Minnesota	March 8, 1881	November 13, 1881	Chester A. Arthur (1881–1885)
34		Charles J. Folger	New York	November 14, 1881	September 4, 1884	Chester A. Arthur (1881–1885)
35		Walter Q. Gresham	Indiana	September 5, 1884	October 30, 1884	Chester A. Arthur (1881–1885)
36		Hugh McCulloch	Indiana	October 31, 1884	March 7, 1885	Chester A. Arthur (1881–1885)
37		Daniel Manning	New York	March 8, 1885	March 31, 1887	Grover Cleveland (1885–1889)
38		Charles S. Fairchild	New York	April 1, 1887	March 6, 1889	Grover Cleveland (1885–1889)
39		William Windom	Minnesota	March 7, 1889	January 29, 1891	Benjamin Harrison (1889–1893)
40		Charles Foster	Ohio	February 25, 1891	March 6, 1893	Benjamin Harrison (1889–1893)
41		John G. Carlisle	Kentucky	March 7, 1893	March 5, 1897	Grover Cleveland (1893–1897)
42		Lyman J. Gage	Illinois	March 6, 1897	January 31, 1902	William McKinley (1897–1901)
42		Lyman J. Gage	Illinois	March 6, 1897	January 31, 1902	Theodore Roosevelt (1901–1909)
43		L. M. Shaw	Iowa	February 1, 1902	March 3, 1907	Theodore Roosevelt (1901–1909)
44		George B. Cortelyou	New York	March 4, 1907	March 7, 1909	Theodore Roosevelt (1901–1909)
45		Franklin MacVeagh	Illinois	March 8, 1909	March 5, 1913	William Howard Taft (1909–1913)
46		William Gibbs McAdoo	New York	March 6, 1913	December 15, 1918	Woodrow Wilson (1913–1921)
47		Carter Glass	Virginia	December 16, 1918	February 1, 1920	Woodrow Wilson (1913–1921)
48		David F. Houston	Missouri	February 2, 1920	March 3, 1921	Woodrow Wilson (1913–1921)
49		Andrew Mellon	Pennsylvania	March 4, 1921	February 12, 1932	Warren G. Harding (1921–1923)
49		Andrew Mellon	Pennsylvania	March 4, 1921	February 12, 1932	Calvin Coolidge (1923–1929)
49		Andrew Mellon	Pennsylvania	March 4, 1921	February 12, 1932	Herbert Hoover (1929–1933)
50		Ogden L. Mills	New York	February 13, 1932	March 4, 1933	Herbert Hoover (1929–1933)
51		William H. Woodin	New York	March 5, 1933	December 31, 1933	Franklin D. Roosevelt (1933–1945)
52		Henry Morgenthau Jr.	New York	January 1, 1934	July 22, 1945	Franklin D. Roosevelt (1933–1945)
53		Fred M. Vinson	Kentucky	July 23, 1945	June 23, 1946	Harry S. Truman (1945–1953)
54		John Wesley Snyder	Missouri	June 25, 1946	January 20, 1953	Harry S. Truman (1945–1953)
55		George M. Humphrey	Ohio	January 21, 1953	July 29, 1957	Dwight D. Eisenhower (1953–1961)
56		Robert Anderson	Connecticut	July 29, 1957	January 20, 1961	Dwight D. Eisenhower (1953–1961)
57		C. Douglas Dillon	New Jersey	January 21, 1961	April 1, 1965	John F. Kennedy (1961–1963)
57		C. Douglas Dillon	New Jersey	January 21, 1961	April 1, 1965	Lyndon B. Johnson (1963–1969)
58		Henry H. Fowler	Virginia	April 1, 1965	December 20, 1968	Lyndon B. Johnson (1963–1969)
59		Joseph W. Barr	Indiana	December 21, 1968	January 20, 1969	Lyndon B. Johnson (1963–1969)
60		David Kennedy	Utah	January 22, 1969	February 10, 1971	Richard Nixon (1969–1974)
61		John Connally	Texas	February 11, 1971	June 12, 1972	Richard Nixon (1969–1974)
62		George Shultz	Illinois	June 12, 1972	May 8, 1974	Richard Nixon (1969–1974)
63		William E. Simon	New Jersey	May 8, 1974	January 20, 1977	Richard Nixon (1969–1974)
63		William E. Simon	New Jersey	May 8, 1974	January 20, 1977	Gerald Ford (1974–1977)
64		W. Michael Blumenthal	Michigan	January 23, 1977	August 4, 1979	Jimmy Carter (1977–1981)
65		G. William Miller	Rhode Island	August 7, 1979	January 20, 1981	Jimmy Carter (1977–1981)
66		Donald Regan	New Jersey	January 22, 1981	February 1, 1985	Ronald Reagan (1981–1989)
67		James Baker	Texas	February 4, 1985	August 17, 1988	Ronald Reagan (1981–1989)
–		M. Peter McPherson; Acting (Note: As Deputy Secretary of the Treasury.)	Michigan	August 17, 1988	September 15, 1988	Ronald Reagan (1981–1989)
68		Nicholas F. Brady	New Jersey	September 15, 1988	January 17, 1993	Ronald Reagan (1981–1989)
68		Nicholas F. Brady	New Jersey	September 15, 1988	January 17, 1993	George H. W. Bush (1989–1993)
69		Lloyd Bentsen	Texas	January 20, 1993	December 22, 1994	Bill Clinton (1993–2001)
–		Frank N. Newman; Acting	Massachusetts	December 22, 1994	January 11, 1995	Bill Clinton (1993–2001)
70		Robert Rubin	New York	January 11, 1995	July 2, 1999	Bill Clinton (1993–2001)
71		Lawrence Summers	Maryland	July 2, 1999	January 20, 2001	Bill Clinton (1993–2001)
72		Paul H. O'Neill	Pennsylvania	January 20, 2001	December 31, 2002	George W. Bush (2001–2009)
–		Kenneth W. Dam; Acting	Illinois	December 31, 2002	February 3, 2003	George W. Bush (2001–2009)
73		John W. Snow	Virginia	February 3, 2003	June 30, 2006	George W. Bush (2001–2009)
–		Robert M. Kimmitt; Acting	Virginia	June 30, 2006	July 10, 2006	George W. Bush (2001–2009)
74		Henry Paulson	Illinois	July 10, 2006	January 20, 2009	George W. Bush (2001–2009)
–		Stuart A. Levey; Acting (Note: As Under Secretary of the Treasury for Terrorism and Financial Intelligence.)	Ohio	January 20, 2009	January 26, 2009	Barack Obama (2009–2017)
75		Timothy Geithner	New York	January 26, 2009	January 25, 2013	Barack Obama (2009–2017)
–		Neal S. Wolin; Acting	Illinois	January 25, 2013	February 28, 2013	Barack Obama (2009–2017)
76		Jack Lew	New York	February 28, 2013	January 20, 2017	Barack Obama (2009–2017)
–		Adam Szubin; Acting	Washington, D.C.	January 20, 2017	February 13, 2017	Donald Trump (2017–2021)
77		Steven Mnuchin	California	February 13, 2017	January 20, 2021	Donald Trump (2017–2021)
–		Andy Baukol; Acting (Note: As Deputy Assistant Secretary for Monetary Policy.)	Virginia	January 20, 2021	January 26, 2021	Joe Biden (2021–2025)
78		Janet Yellen	California	January 26, 2021	January 20, 2025	Joe Biden (2021–2025)
–		David Lebryk; Acting (Note: As Fiscal Assistant Secretary of the Treasury.)	Indiana	January 20, 2025	January 28, 2025	Donald Trump (2025–present)
79		Scott Bessent	South Carolina	January 28, 2025	Incumbent	Donald Trump (2025–present)

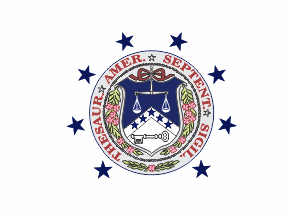
Former flag of the secretary of the treasury, originating from the 19th century.

== Succession ==
=== Presidential succession ===
The secretary of the treasury is fifth in the presidential line of succession, following the secretary of state and preceding the secretary of defense.

=== Succession within the department ===
On August 16, 2016, President Barack Obama signed Executive Order 13735, which changed the order of succession for filling the treasury secretary's role when necessary. At any time when the secretary and the deputy secretary of the treasury have both died, resigned, or cannot serve as secretary for other reasons, the order designates which treasury officers are next in line to serve as acting secretary.

The order of succession is:

#	Office
1*	Under secretaries of the treasury
2	General Counsel of the Department of the Treasury
3*	Deputy under secretaries of the treasury and those assistant secretaries of the treasury appointed by the president by and with the consent of the Senate
4	Chief of Staff
5	Assistant Secretary for Management
6	Fiscal Assistant Secretary
7	Commissioner of Internal Revenue, Internal Revenue Service
8	Commissioner, Bureau of the Fiscal Service
9	Deputy Commissioner, Fiscal Accounting and Shared Services, Bureau of the Fiscal Service
10	Commissioner, Wage and Investment Division, Internal Revenue Service

*In the order in which they shall have taken the oath of office as such officers.

== Notes ==
U.S. order of precedence (ceremonial)
Preceded by Stephen Breyer as retired Associate Justice of the United States Supreme Court	Order of precedence of the United States as Secretary of the Treasury	Succeeded by Pete Hegseth as Secretary of Defense
U.S. presidential line of succession
Preceded by Secretary of State; Marco Rubio	5th in line	Succeeded by Secretary of Defense; Pete Hegseth
