= Washington DC LDS Stake =

Center for the congregations in Washington, D.C

Washington DC Stake (The Church of Jesus Christ of Latter-day Saints)
- Stake President: Nathan Sheets
- Headquarters: Kensington, MD
- Territory: Washington DC and Maryland
- Origin: June 30, 1940
- Official website: www.facebook.com/Mormons-in-DC-983679751649202/

The Washington DC Stake of the Church of Jesus Christ of Latter-day Saints is the regional center for the congregations in the Washington, D.C. area and surrounding towns and cities.

== History of the Washington DC Stake ==
The Washington DC Stake became the first stake in the mid-Atlantic region on June 30, 1940, with Ezra Taft Benson serving as the first stake president. Members of the stake at that time lived anywhere from Richmond, Virginia, to Fairview, Pennsylvania, as well as from Maryland's Chesapeake River to Virginia's Blue Ridge Mountains. Since then, the original stake has branched off into 24 additional stakes with more than 93,000 LDS members in the region.

There are twelve wards (congregations) in the Washington DC Stake, each led by a bishop. The bishops work under the direction of the stake presidency. President James R. Baird served as president of the stake until his untimely death on February 1, 2018. On March 11, 2018, D. Nathan Sheets was called as the new stake president in a special stake conference. Kim O. Golightly and Steven H. Alfandre were called to serve as counselors in the stake presidency at the same time.

== Wards and branches in the Washington DC Stake ==
- Bethesda Ward
- Capitol Hill Ward
- Chevy Chase Ward
- Kensington Ward
- Kentlands Ward
- Montgomery Branch (Chinese)
- Mount Pleasant Ward (Spanish)
- Potomac Ward
- Rock Creek Ward
- Rockville Ward
- Washington DC 1st Ward (Spanish)
- Washington DC 3rd Ward

== Presidents of the Washington DC Stake ==
- Ezra Taft Benson (1940-1944)
- Edgar B. Brossard (1944-1948)
- J. Willard Marriott (1948-1957)
- Milan D. Smith, Sr. (1957-1970)
- Wendell G. Eames (1970-1973)
- W. Don Ladd (1973-1977)
- Ralph Mecham (1977-1982)
- J.W. Marriott, Jr. (1982-1990)
- Ralph W. Hardy Jr. (1990-1999)
- Nolan D. Archibald (1999-2007)
- Ronald T. Harrison (2007-2015)
- James R. Baird (2015-2018)
- D. Nathan Sheets (2018–present)

== See also ==
- The Church of Jesus Christ of Latter-day Saints in the District of Columbia
