= Keith W. Wilcox =

American Mormon leader

Keith Wilson Wilcox

First Quorum of the Seventy
- October 6, 1984 – April 1, 1989
- Called by: Spencer W. Kimball
- End reason: transferred to Second Quorum of the Seventy

Second Quorum of the Seventy
- April 1, 1989 – October 1, 1989
- Called by: Ezra Taft Benson
- End reason: honorably released

Personal details
- Born: Keith Wilson Wilcox; May 15, 1921; Hyrum, Utah, United States
- Died: December 16, 2011 (aged 90); Ogden, Utah, United States

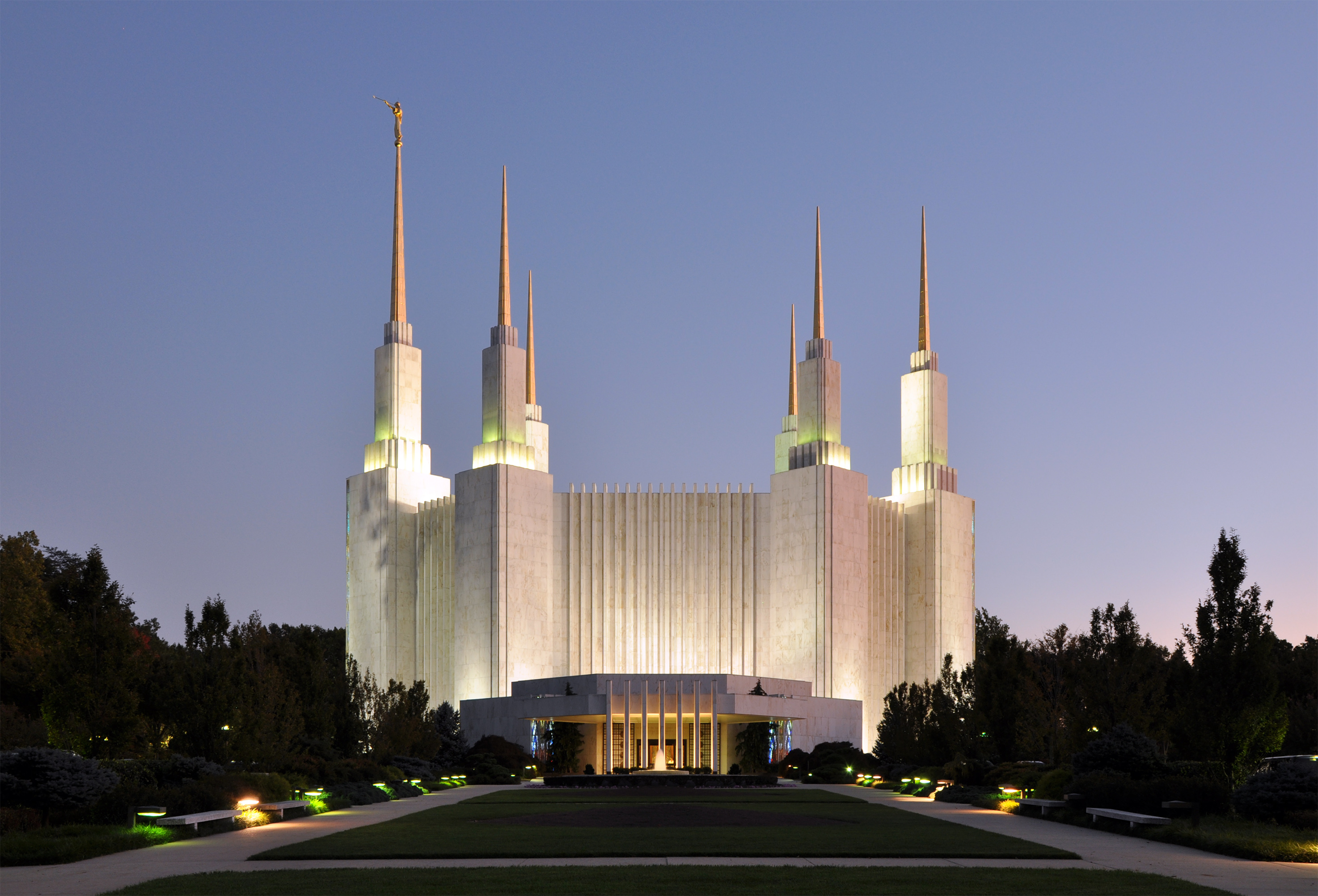
Washington D.C. Temple designed by Keith W. Wilcox

Keith Wilson Wilcox (May 15, 1921 – December 16, 2011) was a general authority of the Church of Jesus Christ of Latter-day Saints (LDS Church) from 1984 to 1989. He was also a prominent architect who designed the Missionary Training Center in Provo, Utah and the Washington D.C. Temple. He also served one term in the Utah House of Representatives.

Wilcox was born in Hyrum, Utah but spent most of his life in Ogden, Utah. He served in the United States Navy during World War II. He began his college studies at what is now Weber State University and received a degree in mechanical engineering from the University of Utah. He then received a master's degree in architecture from the University of Oregon.

Wilcox was elected to the Utah State House of Representatives as a Republican in 1978. He served for one term.

In the LDS Church, Wilcox served as a bishop, stake president and regional representative. From 1974 to 1977, he was president of the church's Indiana Indianapolis Mission. He also served for four years as president of the Ogden Utah Temple. Wilcox was called as a general authority and member of the First Quorum of the Seventy in October 1984. He served in that quorum until he was moved to the Second Quorum of the Seventy when it was created in April 1989 and was then released as a general authority in October 1989. From 1992 until 1994, Wilcox was the director of the Los Angeles Temple Visitors Center.

On July 17, 1945, Wilcox married Viva May Gammell in the Logan Utah Temple and they are the parents of six daughters.

Wilcox wrote the work The Washington DC Temple: A Light to the World, a history of its architectural development. Weber State University has an art scholarship named for Wilcox.

Wilcox died in Ogden, Utah.
