= Washington D.C. Temple =

Temple of the Church of Jesus Christ of Latter-day Saints

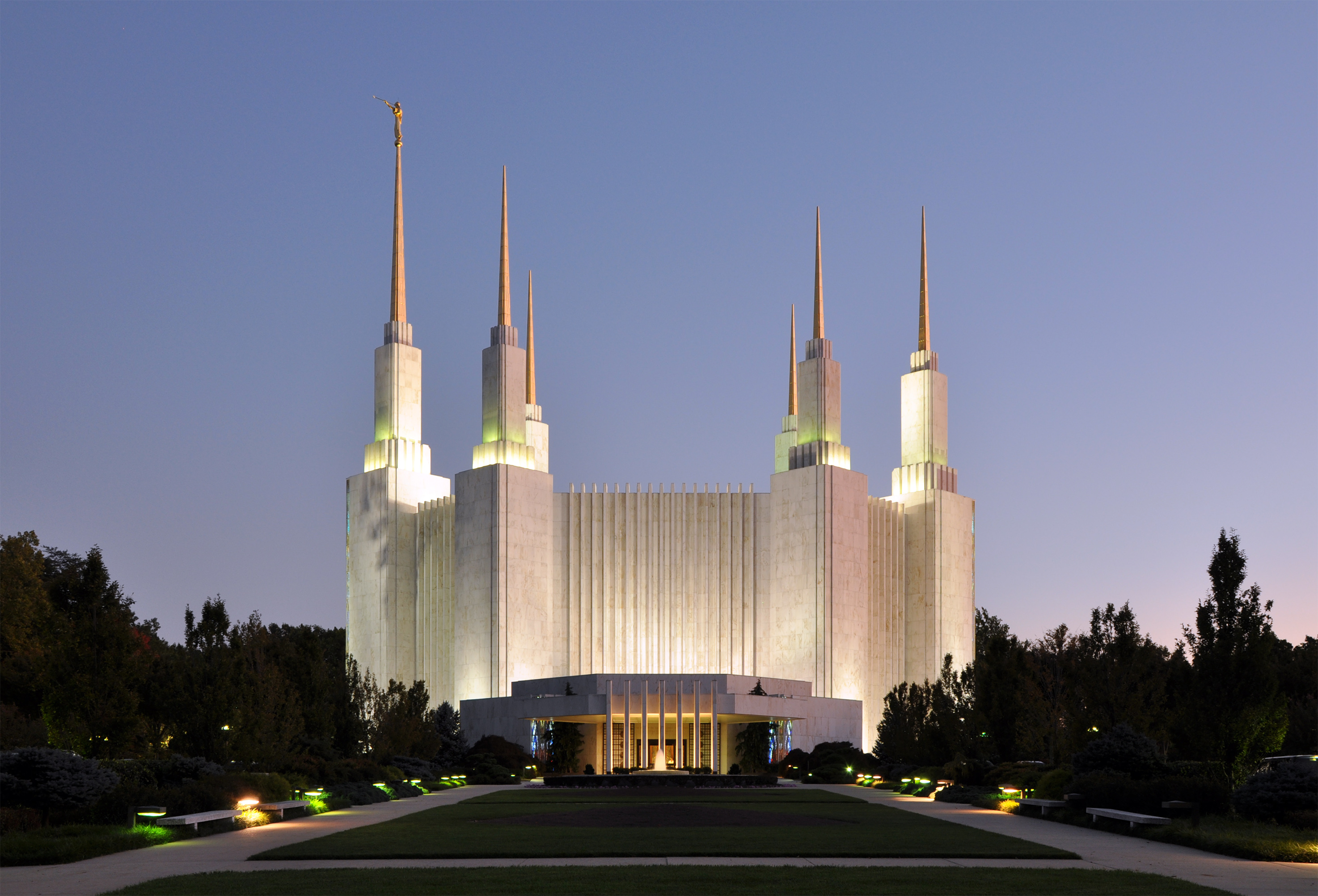
- Interactive map of Washington D.C. Temple
- Number: 16
- Dedication: November 19, 1974, by Spencer W. Kimball
- Site: 52 acres (21 ha)
- Floor area: 156,558 ft^{2} (14,544.7 m^{2})
- Height: 288 ft (88 m)
- Official website • News & images

Church chronology
← Provo Utah Temple	Washington D.C. Temple	→ São Paulo Brazil Temple

Additional information
- Announced: November 15, 1968, by David O. McKay
- Groundbreaking: December 7, 1968, by Hugh B. Brown
- Open house: September 17 – November 2, 1974; April 28 – June 11, 2022
- Rededicated: August 14, 2022, by Russell M. Nelson
- Current president: Peter K. Christensen
- Designed by: Fred L. Markham, Harold K. Beecher, Henry P. Fetzer, and Keith W. Wilcox
- Location: Kensington, Maryland, United States
- Coordinates: 39°0′51″N 77°3′56″W
- Exterior finish: Reinforced concrete sheathed in Alabama white marble
- Baptistries: 1
- Ordinance rooms: 6 (stationary)
- Sealing rooms: 14
- Clothing rental: Yes
- Visitors' center: Yes

The Washington D.C. Temple (originally known as the Washington Temple until 1999) is the 16th operating temple of the Church of Jesus Christ of Latter-day Saints. Located in Kensington, Maryland, near Washington, D.C., and the Capital Beltway, it became the church's first temple east of the Mississippi River since the original Nauvoo Temple, completed in 1846. At 160,000 square feet (15,000 m^{2}), it is the church's third-largest temple. Construction was completed in 1974 at a cost of $15 million (about $119 million in 2025). More than 750,000 people attended a seven-week open house before its dedication.

Designed to blend mid-century modern elements with traditional temple architecture, it has six gold-tipped spires modeled after the Salt Lake Temple. The temple has no cathedral-like space; instead, most rooms have no windows. Standing 288 feet (88 m) tall, the temple's central eastern tower was the church's tallest at its dedication. It supports a 18-foot (5.5 m) gilded statue of the angel Moroni. The temple's 57-acre (23 ha) wooded site was chosen to make it a landmark along the Capital Beltway, and traffic reports often refer to it as "the temple". Since 1978, the temple has hosted the annual Festival of Lights, drawing thousands to see live performances and millions of holiday lights, with a foreign ambassador as guest speaker each year. The temple is accessible to church members with a current temple recommend.

== History ==
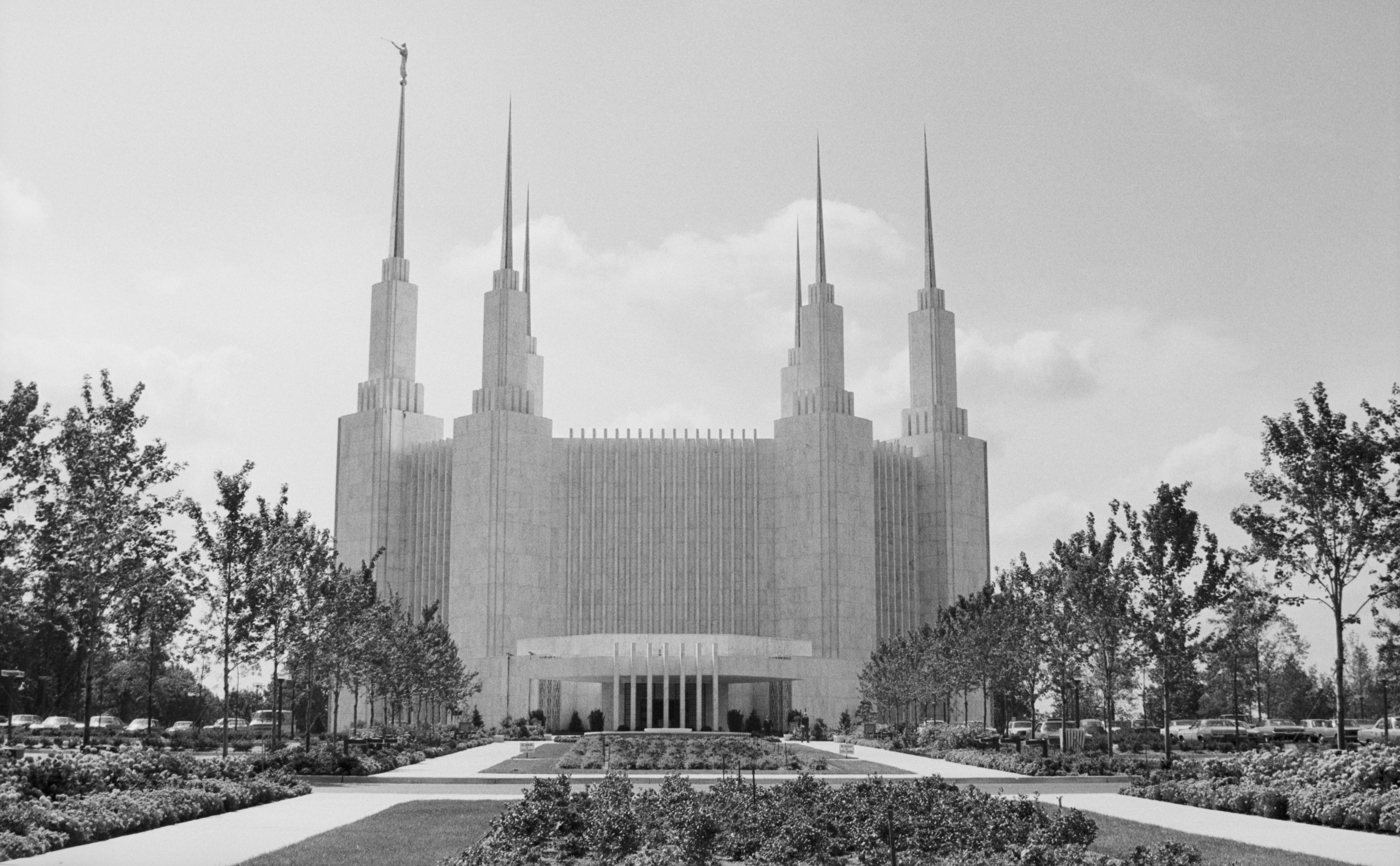
The Washington Temple in 1974

The plan to build the temple was announced on November 15, 1968, by church president David O. McKay. A groundbreaking ceremony was held on December 7, with Hugh B. Brown presiding, and attended by local church members and community leaders. Land clearing began May 28, 1971.

=== The site ===
The temple is part of a 57-acre (23 ha) site along the Capital Beltway, purchased by the church in 1962. The 4,220 acre property changed hands multiple times, and the site's long history has been described by the Deseret News as being "as American as the capital city itself". The land was inhabited periodically by Native Americans, before passing through the ownership by a series of European monarchs, beginning with King James I (of England), by Charles I, to Cecilius Calvert, to Charles Calvert, until it was given to Colonel William Joseph, upon which the property became known as "Joseph's Park", the owner.

Parts of the land were sold off, and the remaining 3,182 acres were purchased by Daniel Carroll. Carroll's nephew John (who was the first Catholic bishop in the United States, and a delegate to the Constitutional Convention in 1787), built a chapel below the hill. The property later passed to Daniel Carroll's grandson, who built a home approximately 1 mile from the current temple site. He renamed the property "the Highlands", and wore out the land growing tobacco on it. Civil War troops briefly occupied the land, although no battles occurred on the site. The edge of the property was never clear-cut, so the old-growth forest remained in that area. The property eventually passed to Clarence Moore, who later died on the Titanic. His widow sold the estate, and after that the site passed between various companies and investors.

In September 1962, plans were underway to transform the site into a shopping center with a supermarket, high-rises, and townhomes. However, during negotiations for the temple site, a personal connection developed between church representatives and the Jewish owners of the property, including David Bazelon. The owners, who supported the Zionist movement, discarded a competing offer and sold the land to the church at a discount, because of their shared respect for religious history, temple building, and the sacred purpose of the temple.

Hotelier and prominent businessman J. Willard Marriott, a church member and former president of the Washington, D.C. Stake, was instrumental in the selection of the site and in promoting it to church leadership as a potential temple site. In 1968, Marriott, accompanied by other prominent Washington, D.C. area church members, including Milan Smith, met with McKay and the First Presidency in Salt Lake City in a bid to begin construction on the temple at the site. Marriott pledged $500,000 towards the temple's construction.

A week after that meeting, McKay approved the proposal. The construction of the temple on the site was presented to the Quorum of the Twelve Apostles the next day. The proposal met with some opposition from more conservative members of the body, particularly Mark E. Petersen and future church president Harold B. Lee. They objected to the location of the temple in an area with such a significant African American population, such as Washington, D.C. At the time, the church had policies that limited the participation of Black people and faced considerable national opposition from civil rights advocates. Lee was concerned the temple site would attract protests from African Americans and favored an alternative location, such as Valley Forge, Pennsylvania, which had a smaller African American population. The concerns of Lee and Petersen were overruled by McKay, and construction proceeded.

To build the temple, 11 acres (4.5 ha) of the 52 acre (21 ha) site was cleared. The temple was designed by Keith W. Wilcox, Fred L. Markham, Henry P. Fetzer, Harold K. Beecher, and Emil B. Fetzer. It was the church's first temple built east of the Mississippi River since the dedication of the Nauvoo Temple in 1846.

=== Construction and opening ===
Original cost estimates for the temple were about $15 million (about $119 million in 2025). Church members in the temple's district contributed about a third of the cost of construction, and members who would use the building were asked to raise about $4.5 million.

When it opened, the temple served about 300,000 Latter-day Saints in 31 U.S. states and the District of Columbia, seven Canadian provinces, Cuba, Haiti, Puerto Rico, the Bahamas, and the Dominican Republic. Many sites important to early church history, such as Nauvoo, Palmyra, and Kirtland, are within the Washington D.C., Temple district. Before the groundbreaking ceremony and before the Capital Beltway was finished, the temple's location was moved 60 ft (18 m) to exactly align with the highway and thereby inspire curiosity about the faith.

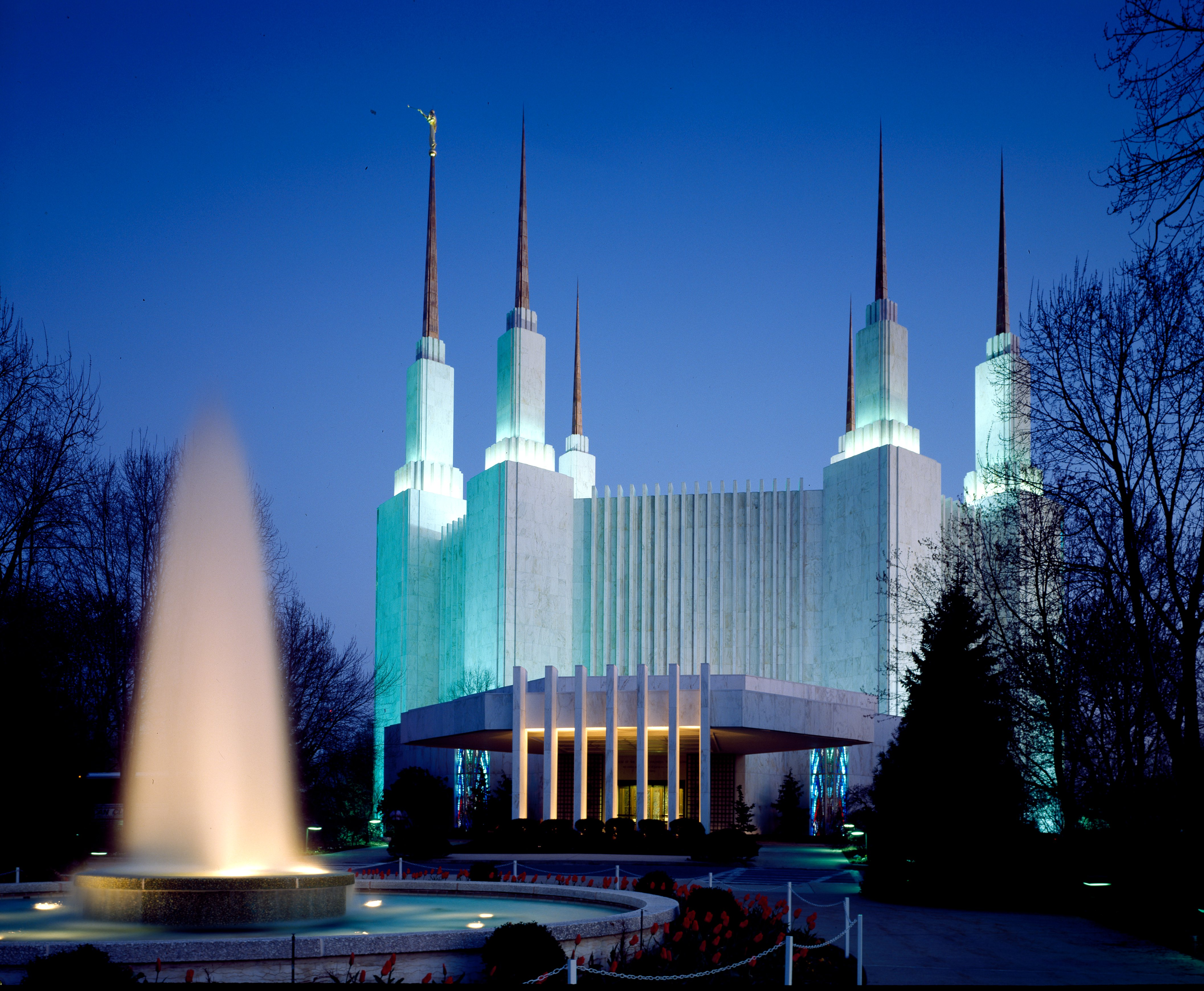
Front view with main entrance

On September 17, 1974, during the first week of an open house, government officials and diplomats from around the world were taken on tours of the building. First Lady Betty Ford, who attended, said the temple was "one of great beauty and a great addition to our surroundings here in Washington". The open house was almost canceled at the last minute when a fire marshal required an emergency backup generator for the sprinkler system in case of a power outage. Harold Ranquist, a local member and Army Reservist, spent eight hours the day before the event using his military connections to find a generator. A generator was installed just 25 minutes before the open house began. Ranquist said, "That day, 30 tickets [to the open house] were committed to the various Colonels and Generals with whom I had spoken".

Church president Spencer W. Kimball held a news conference on the bridge of the temple, drawing more than 100 reporters and photographers. The open house continued for seven weeks, drawing more than 750,000 people. At a completion ceremony, the church's First Presidency buried a time capsule with historical items near a corner of the temple. This included scriptures (the Bible, the Doctrine and Covenants), copies of current newspapers, photos of church leaders, a replica of a statue of Brigham Young, and tickets from the dedication. Church president Spencer W. Kimball held ten dedicatory sessions from November 19 to 22, 1974, drawing about 4,200 people apiece. It became the church's 16th dedicated and operating temple.

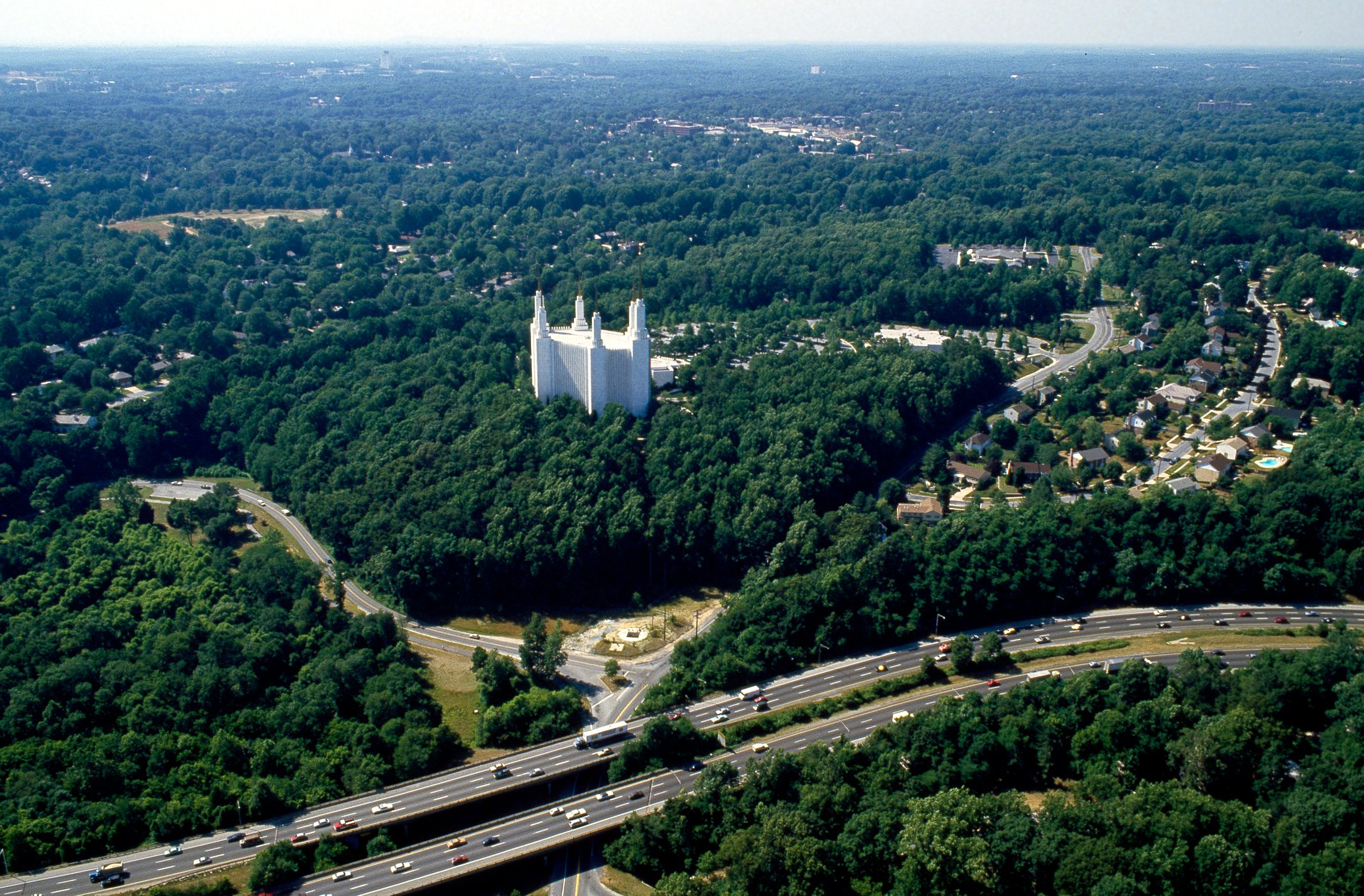
The temple and its surroundings

On August 23, 2011, a 5.9-magnitude earthquake knocked off the tops of four spires and shook loose several pieces of marble from the building's facade. Repairs were made the following month without any disruptions in the temple's normal operating schedule.

=== 2018–2022 renovation ===
On February 23, 2017, the church announced that the temple would close in March 2018 for a three-year renovation to update furnishings and mechanical systems. The visitors' center remained open.

In February 2020, as renovations neared completion, church officials announced a public open house from September 24 through October 31, and planned a rededication for December 13. However, on June 17, amid the COVID-19 pandemic, officials postponed the events until large public gatherings were deemed safe. In July 2021, church officials said the open house would take place from April 28 to June 4, 2022, and the rededication on June 19. In January 2022, church officials rescheduled the rededication to August and said the open house would be extended as needed.

The church put up banners in the city to promote the event and recorded a virtual tour, led by Gary E. Stevenson and Dale G. Renlund, members of the Quorum of the Twelve Apostles. During the open house, more than 250,000 people visited the temple. Russell M. Nelson rededicated the temple in three sessions on August 14, 2022. At the time, the temple's district covered 38 stakes in Maryland, Virginia, Pennsylvania, the District of Columbia, and West Virginia.

==== Artwork ====
In 2022, John Scott's 1974 mural The Last Judgment in the temple's entryway was removed and replaced by His Return, an 8-by-12-foot mural depicting the Second Coming of Jesus Christ. It was painted by Dan Wilson, a fine arts graduate from Utah Valley University, who said he was inspired by Carl Bloch. Drawing on spiritual practices such as fasting and priesthood blessings, Wilson spent 2,000 hours painting the piece, expanding the number of angels from 120 to over 300 and increasing their ethnic diversity.

According to church historian Emily Utt, other artworks commissioned for the 2022 renovations aimed to reflect the church's diverse global membership, aligning with church president Nelson's temple expansion initiative. Paintings by Elspeth Young—With a Sincere Heart, The Pure in Heart, He Restoreth My Soul, and And Thou Didst Hear Me—portray figures of diverse ethnicities, including a Filipino woman, a Mestizo woman from Mexico, and an African American woman in prayer.

== Location and "Surrender Dorothy" ==
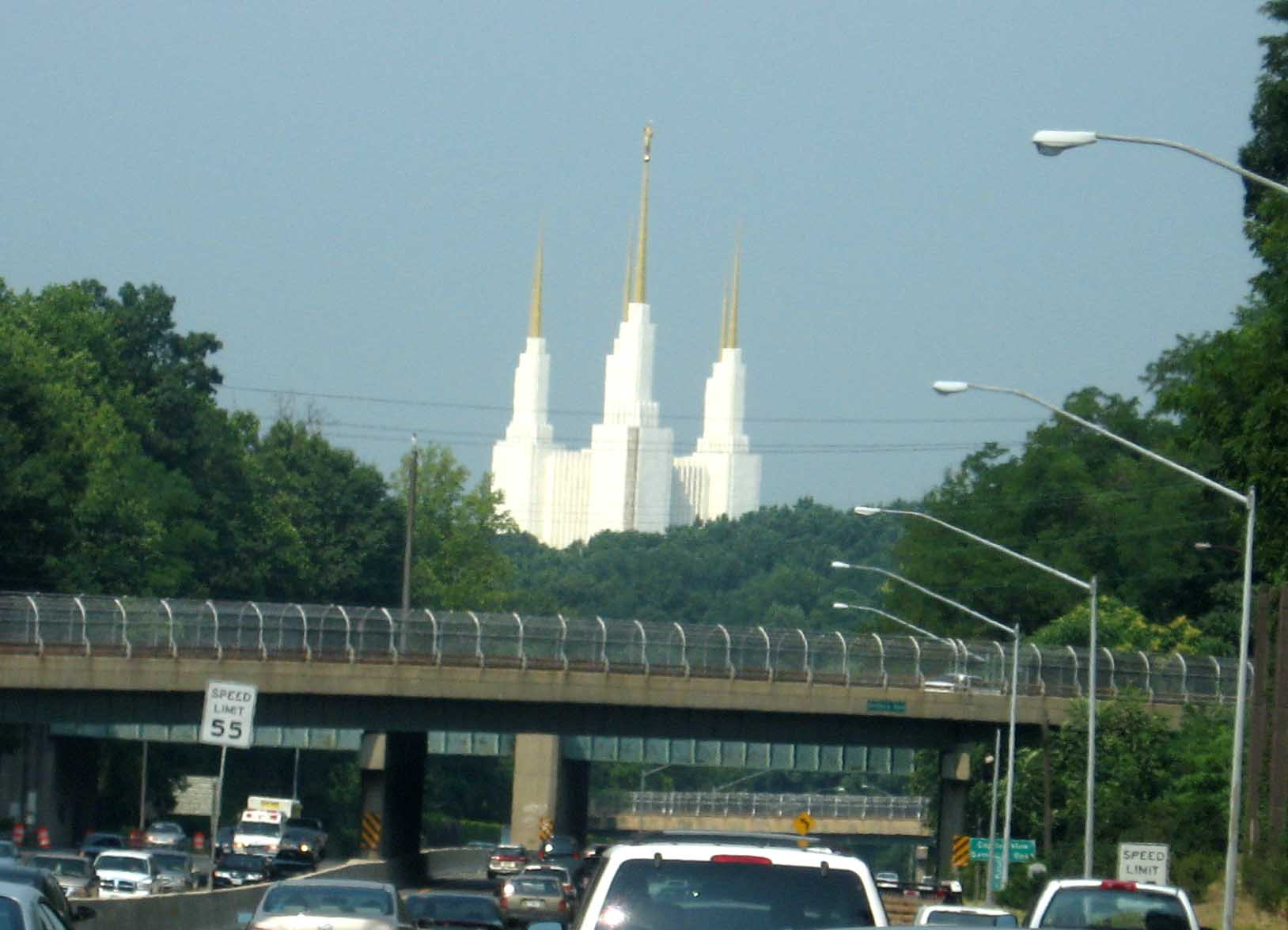
Temple as seen from the Outer Loop of the Capital Beltway

The temple is located in suburban Kensington, Maryland, north of Washington, D.C., near the Capital Beltway. The temple is a local landmark, due in part to its visibility from the Beltway; D.C.-area traffic reports often refer to "the temple". Maryland Governor Larry Hogan called it a "beacon of hope". (Note: The Salt Lake Tribune and KSL have said it is an iconic landmark, but generally news organizations quote Larry Hogan's saying of it being an "iconic landmark".)

In 1974, a group of Catholic schoolgirls seeking to promote their production of The Wizard of Oz created the message "Surrender Dorothy" on the Linden Lane bridge above the beltway. They met after midnight and spelled out the phrase—the Wicked Witch's message in The Wizard of Oz—by pressing wadded newspaper into a chain-link fence. Although the message was removed, it soon reappeared as graffiti.

By the early 1970s, the graffito "Surrender Dorothy" had become a recurring feature on the CSX Transportation bridge crossing over the Capital Beltway near the temple, and the Washington Post called it "the single most famous graffito in the Washington area". They also said that the church reportedly did not care for the message. Highway crews periodically removed the graffiti, but it repeatedly reappeared. According to the Deseret News, the temple became "known affectionately by locals as Oz". In 2022, D. Todd Christofferson was asked by CBS News what church members think when they hear the temple compared to the land of Oz, he said that it makes them smile, and that part of the reason the open house was happening was so people "see it as something much, much more than Oz".

Author Orson Scott Card, writing for the Deseret News in 2005, explained that the humor of the "Surrender Dorothy" graffiti lay in the unintentional connection of the temple to The Wizard of Oz: "This is funny because clearly the (Latter-day Saints) didn't intend their temple to remind anybody of a classic fantasy movie, but once somebody put up the graffiti, it made everybody think of it and laugh". Card noted that the juxtaposition of the temple's architecture with the lush greenery and the clever quote created this unexpected cultural link.

== Design and architecture ==
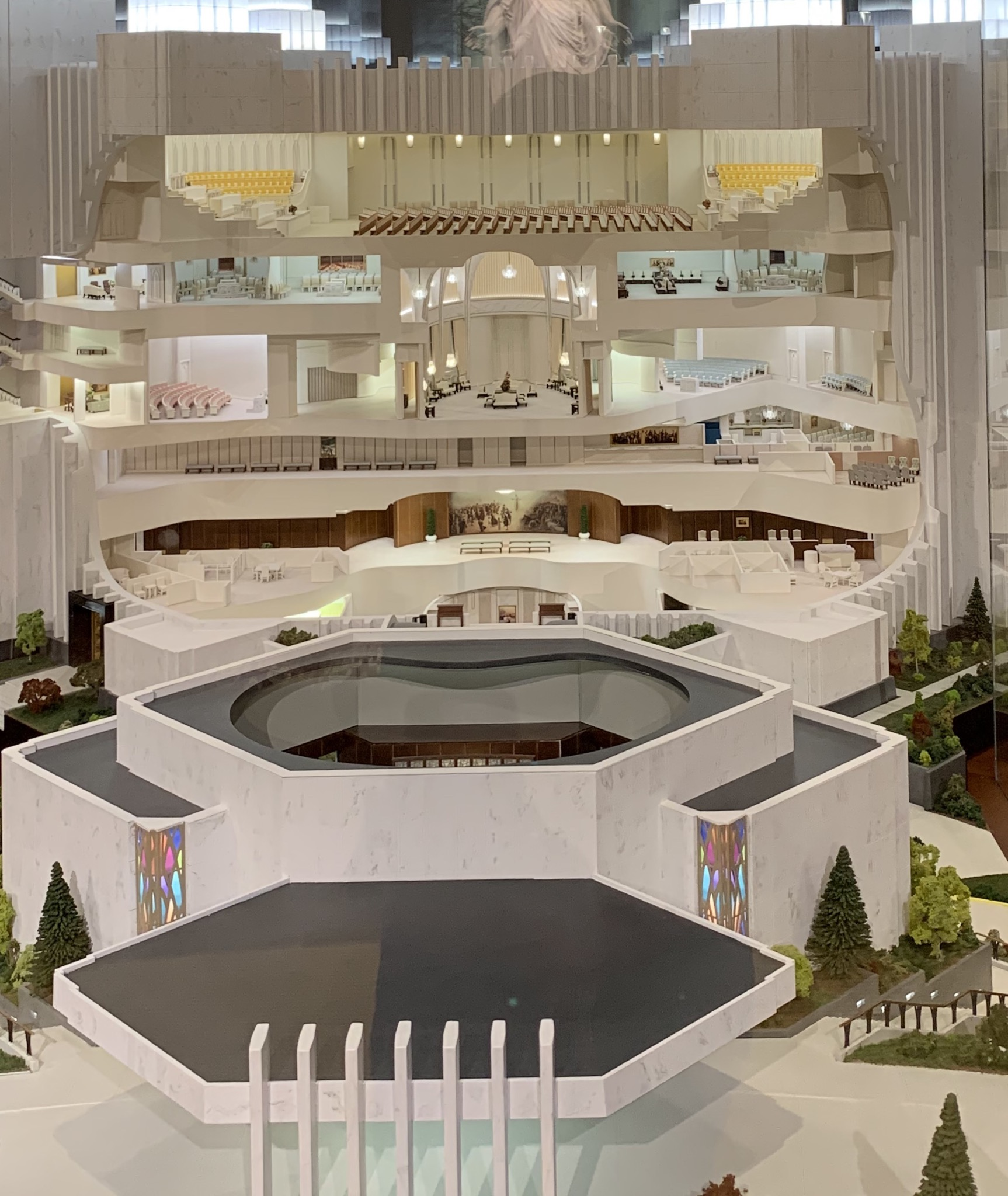
Model of the temple's interior

The seven-story temple's architectural style blends elements of mid-century modern architecture with a traditional Latter-day Saint temple design. The modern six-spire design was modeled after the Salt Lake Temple—with three towers to the east representing the Melchizedek priesthood and three to the west symbolizing the Aaronic priesthood—to make the building recognizable as one of the church's temples. The temple has no cathedral-like space inside; most rooms are small, "quiet and intimate", and windowless.

The eastern central tower is 288 feet (88 m) tall, making it the tallest temple constructed by the church, and has the third largest square footage of a temple with a total floor area of 160,000 square feet (15,000 m^{2}). The temple has a baptismal font used for members to perform proxy baptisms for the dead; with 12 oxen representing the 12 tribes of Israel; six ordinance rooms; and fourteen sealing rooms. The angel Moroni statue, standing on the tallest tower, is 18 feet (5.5 m) tall and weighs 2 tons. This was one of the first to depict the angel holding a set of golden plates. The Washington D.C. Ward meeting house displayed a similar statue until it was moved to the Church History Museum. The building is made of reinforced concrete and structural steel, the outer walls are covered in white Alabama marble, and the spires are coated in 24-carat gold. There are two large stained-glass windows on the eastern and westernmost spires. Other window-type spaces in the facade are covered with translucent marble shaved to 0.625 inches (1.59 cm) thick.

During the 2018 restoration, an architectural glass firm restored the glass by taking charcoal rubbings before cleaning and recasting it in resin to match the original design. The bridge between the entry room and the temple represents "leaving the world behind to enter the holy house of the Lord". Inside ornate dressing rooms, members change into all-white clothing. The celestial room has a high ceiling, gold leaf-adorned walls, a large central crystal chandelier and 12 smaller ones, and a modern furniture design. The celestial room is meant to symbolize heaven, and was designed for prayer and quiet contemplation. No ordinances are performed in the celestial room.

Despite the lack of glass windows, the temple is well-lit, representing the light of Christ, according to church apostle David A. Bednar. The doorway to the temple features seven different medallions with representative symbols: the earth, the moon, the sun (with a similar face to the Nauvoo sunstone), a planet, seven pentagons that represent seven dispensations (periods of times when the gospel was on the earth), and a star. It is also one of the few temples that uses the Big Dipper (pointing to Polaris) as a symbol, which represents the leadership of the church constantly pointing people to God. The interior includes a stained-glass depiction of the Tree of Life, a symbol in the Book of Mormon. The temple occupies a 52-acre site, with only 11 acres developed. The temple has green lawns and annuals over 64,822 square feet, along with perennials, shrubs, and trees meant to complement native vegetation.

== Cultural and community impact ==
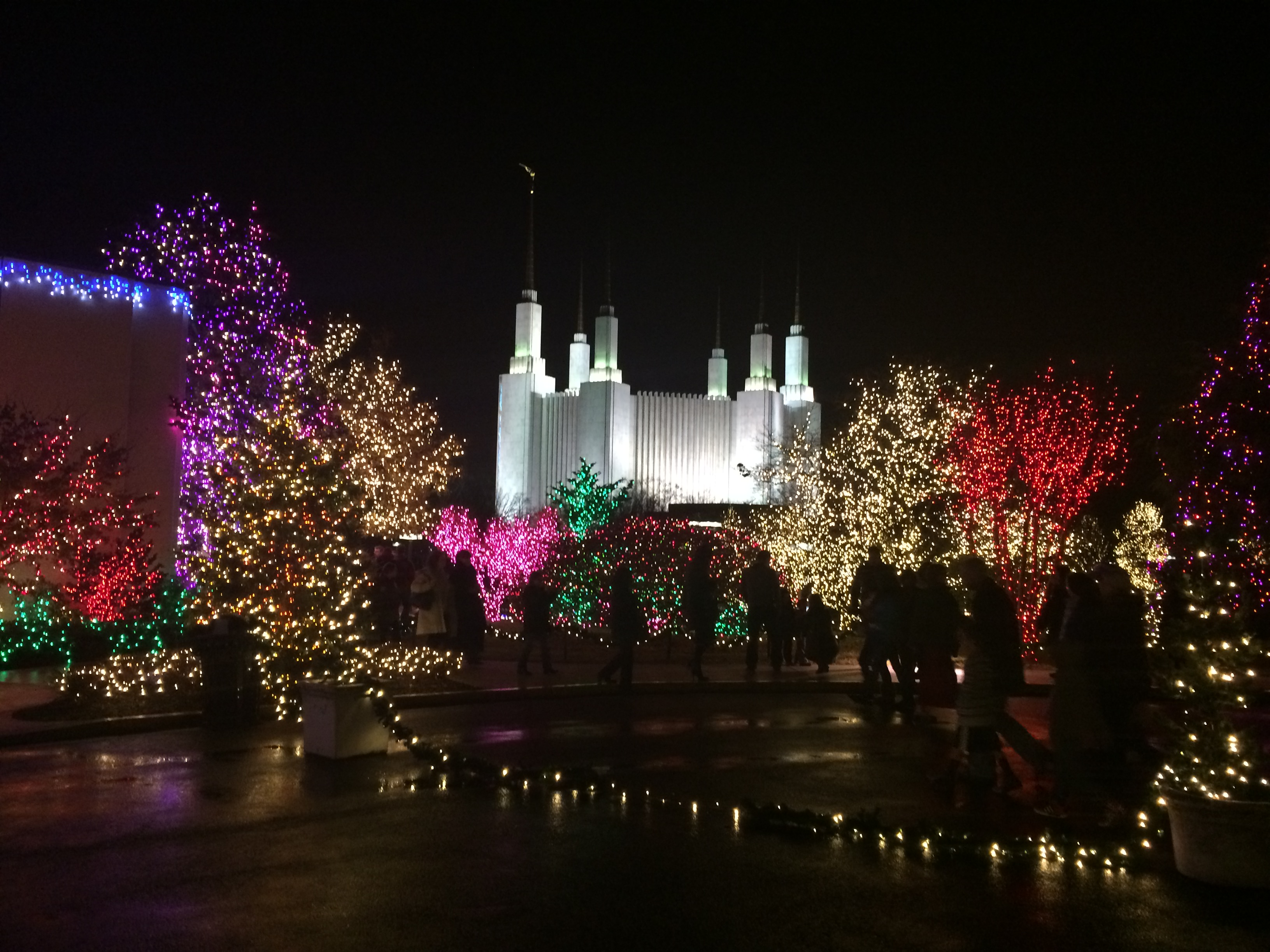
Festival of Lights at the Washington D.C. Temple, 2014

The visitors' center next to the temple acts as an educational resource, helping members and non-members understand the role of the temple's place in church history, and of temples in the church and as a symbol of God. Another building, the Washington D.C. FamilySearch Center, enables members and nonmembers to do genealogical research with organizations such as the National Society Daughters of the American Revolution and the Afro-American Historical and Genealogical Society.

Since 1978, the temple has hosted the annual Festival of Lights at the visitors' center from December 2 to January 1. The event attracts thousands of visitors who come to view millions of lights on the temple grounds. The festival features live performances by the Washington, D.C. Temple Choir; a public lighting ceremony; a narrated outdoor nativity scene; and nightly performances from various regional artists and musicians. Beginning in 1989, church leaders invited foreign ambassadors to co-host the annual Festival of Lights at the temple's visitors' center. The initiative has continued, strengthening diplomatic relationships and drawing attention to the temple's significance in the community. Each year, a different ambassador to the United States is invited as a guest speaker at the festival's opening lighting ceremony. In 2011, Bill Marriott and his wife, Donna, hosted Brazilian Ambassador to the United States Mauro Vieira, with L. Tom Perry of the Quorum of the Twelve Apostles presiding.

In 2021, a Reverse Open House Series was held, where local church members visited other religious groups in the DC area to learn about their beliefs, participate in their religious practices, and promote interfaith dialogue and understanding. The series was created by Georgetown University's Diana Brown as an interfaith fellowship project and was planned to coincide with the temple’s own open house. Events included visits to a Sikhs gurdwara, a Jewish synagogue, an Ahmadiyya mosque, and a joint interfaith iftar hosted at a Latter-day Saint meetinghouse during Ramadan.

== Admittance and use ==
The temple is not used for Sunday worship services, and is not open to the public like Latter-day Saint meeting houses, but rather is a central place of worship and spiritual ceremonies for church members such as sealings and baptisms for the dead. Entry into the temple is only available to those who hold a valid temple recommend. Church officials have said that activities within temples are not secret, but are sacred, deeply significant to church members, and therefore not discussed lightly or informally.

Before the 1974 dedication, a seven-week public open house was held. This allowed people of all faiths to see the temple's architecture and learn about its sacred functions. More than 750,000 people visited, about 100,000 more than at any previous temple open house. The event was covered by local journalists, who described local residents' excitement and trepidation about the new building. Another public open house was held after a four-year renovation from April 28 to June 11, 2022, drawing more than 250,000 visitors to the temple.

== Temple presidents ==
Since its dedication in 1974, the temple has been overseen by temple presidents and temple matrons, each typically serving a term of three years. The president and matron oversee the administration of temple operations and provide guidance and training for both temple patrons and staff.

Notable temple presidents include Franklin D. Richards (1983–1986), David S. King (1990–1993), and F. Melvin Hammond (2005–2008). As of 2024, the temple president is Peter K. Christensen, with Toby E. Christensen serving as matron.

== See also ==
- Comparison of temples of The Church of Jesus Christ of Latter-day Saints
- List of temples of The Church of Jesus Christ of Latter-day Saints
- List of temples of The Church of Jesus Christ of Latter-day Saints by geographic region
- Temple architecture (LDS Church)
