= Under Secretary of the Treasury for International Affairs =

US Treasury official

United States Under Secretary of the Treasury for International Affairs
- Seal of the United States Department of the Treasury

- Flag of an Under Secretary of the Treasury

- Incumbent; Erin Browne since August 7, 2026
- Department of the Treasury
- Style: The Honorable
- Reports to: Secretary of the Treasury; Deputy Secretary of the Treasury
- Seat: Treasury Building; Washington, D.C.
- Appointer: President of the United States; with Senate advice and consent
- Term length: No fixed term
- First holder: David C. Mulford
- Website: Official website

The under secretary of the treasury for international affairs is a high-ranking position within the United States Department of the Treasury that reports to, advises, and assists the Secretary of the Treasury and the Deputy Secretary of the Treasury on international economic issues and is often referred to as the U.S. Treasury’s top economic diplomat.

The under secretary leads the development and implementation of policies in the areas of international finance, trade in financial services, investment, economic development, international debt. It also leads the development of policies on U.S. participation in the International Monetary Fund, the World Bank, and the other multilateral development banks (including the Inter-American Development Bank, the African Development Bank, the Asian Development Bank, and the European Bank for Reconstruction and Development). The under secretary also coordinates international economic policies with the G7 and G20.

== Overview ==
The Office of International Affairs (IA), led by the under secretary of the treasury for international affairs, has oversight of the following:

- Office of International Economic Analysis
- Assistant Secretary of the Treasury for International Finance
  - Office of Asia
  - Office of Europe and Eurasia
  - Office of Western Hemisphere
  - Office of Middle East and North Africa
  - Office of International Monetary Policy
  - Office of International Financial Markets
- Assistant Secretary of the Treasury for International Trade and Development
  - Office of Trade and Investment Policy
  - Office of Investment, Energy, and Infrastructure
  - Office of International Development Finance and Policy
  - Office of Technical Assistance
- Assistant Secretary of the Treasury for Investment Security
  - Office of Investment Security
    - Committee on Foreign Investment in the United States (CFIUS)
- United States Executive Director of the African Development Bank
- United States Executive Director of the International Monetary Fund
- United States Executive Director of the World Bank
- United States Executive Director of the Asian Development Bank
- United States Executive Director of the Inter-American Development Bank
- United States Executive Director of the European Bank for Reconstruction and Development

The Office of International Affairs also oversees the operations of the Exchange Stabilization Fund and the U.S.–China Strategic and Economic Dialogue.

== List of under secretaries of the treasury for international affairs ==
Name	Assumed office	Left office	President appointed by
David C. Mulford	1989	1992	George H. W. Bush
Lawrence Summers	April 5, 1993	August 11, 1995	Bill Clinton
Jeffrey R. Shafer	1995	1997	Bill Clinton
David Lipton	1997	1998	Bill Clinton
Timothy Geithner	July 3, 1998	January 20, 2001	Bill Clinton
John B. Taylor	2001	2005	George W. Bush
Timothy D. Adams	July 2, 2005	August 2, 2007	George W. Bush
David McCormick, PhD	August 2007	January 20, 2009	George W. Bush
Lael Brainard	April 20, 2010	November 8, 2013	Barack Obama
D. Nathan Sheets	September 18, 2014	January 20, 2017	Barack Obama
David Malpass	September 25, 2017	April 9, 2019	Donald Trump
Brent McIntosh	September 2019	January 20, 2021	Donald Trump
Jay Shambaugh	January 13, 2023	January 20, 2025	Joe R. Biden
Erin Browne	August 7, 2026	Present	Donald Trump
