= Jay Shambaugh =

American academic, economist, and government official

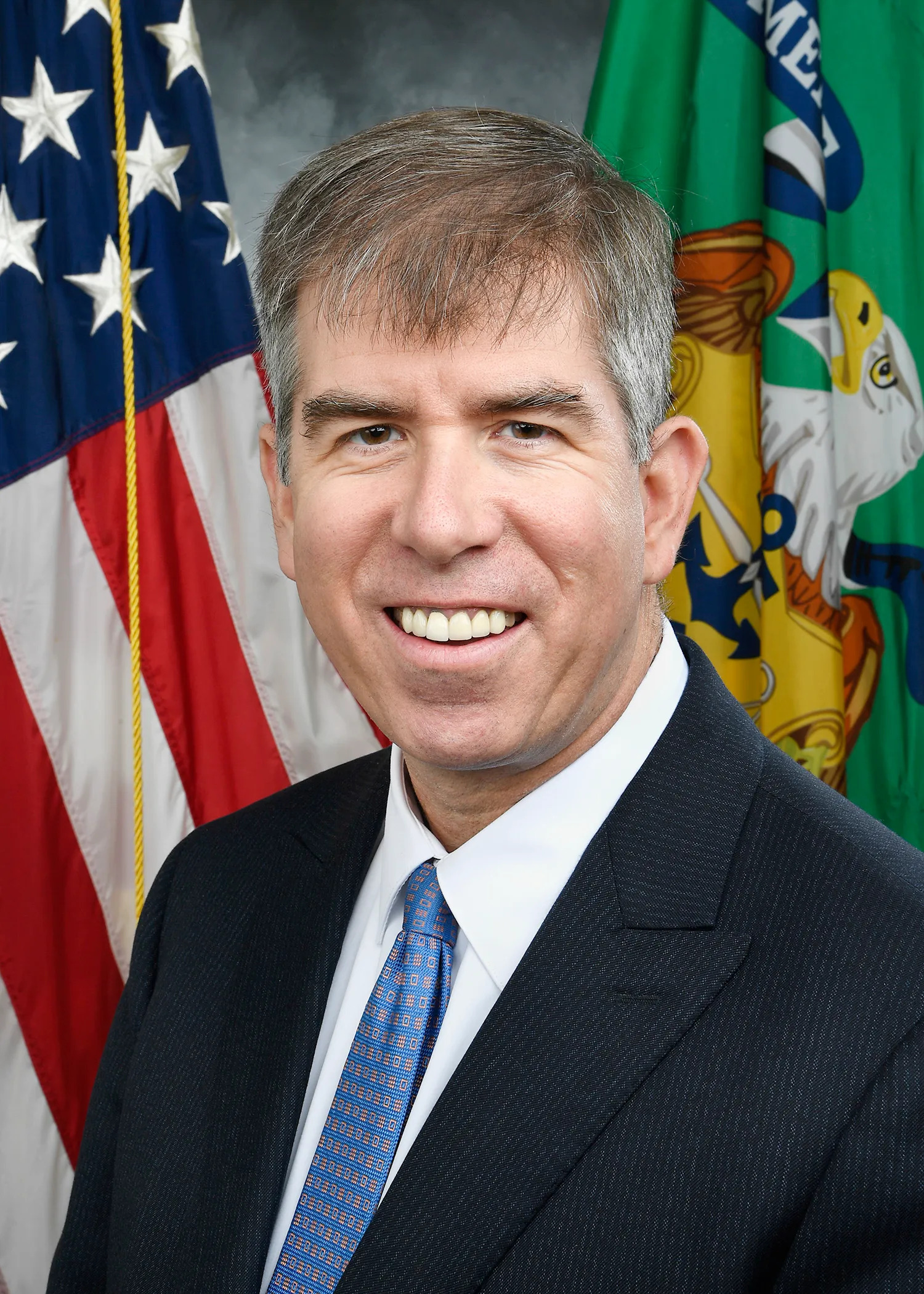

Under Secretary of the Treasury for International Affairs
- In office January 13, 2023 – January 20, 2025
- President: Joe Biden
- Preceded by: Brent McIntosh
- Succeeded by: Erin Browne

Personal details
- Education: Yale University (BA); Tufts University (MA); University of California, Berkeley (PhD)

Jay Curtis Shambaugh is an American economist who served as Under Secretary of the Treasury for International Affairs at the U.S. Department of the Treasury from 2023 to 2025.

== Education ==
Shambaugh holds a BA from Yale University, a MA from the Fletcher School, and a PhD in economics from the University of California, Berkeley.

== Career ==
=== Academic ===
Shambaugh has worked as an instructor at Dartmouth College and Georgetown University. He was also a visiting scholar at the International Monetary Fund. He was a research associate at the National Bureau of Economic Research and was a senior fellow at the Brookings Institution. From 2015 to 2017, Shambaugh was a staff economist on the Council of Economic Advisers. He has since worked as a professor of economics and international affairs at the George Washington University and director of the Institute for International Economic Policy. Shambaugh has appeared as a guest on NPR, where he has provided commentary on economic policy related to gig work.

=== U.S. Department of the Treasury ===
In February 2022, Shambaugh was nominated to serve as under secretary of the treasury for international affairs. He was confirmed by the United States Senate on December 13, 2022, by a vote of 70–27, and he was sworn in by Secretary Janet Yellen on January 13, 2023.

On April 18, 2023, Shambaugh delivered a speech on the state of the global economy at the Brookings Institution.

On July 26, 2023, Shambaugh testified to the U.S. Senate Foreign Relations Committee on international economic coercion and economic competitiveness. His testimony focused on U.S. engagement with China and how Treasury uses its economic tools to promote U.S. national security and foreign policy interests.
