= David Gelles =

American journalist and author

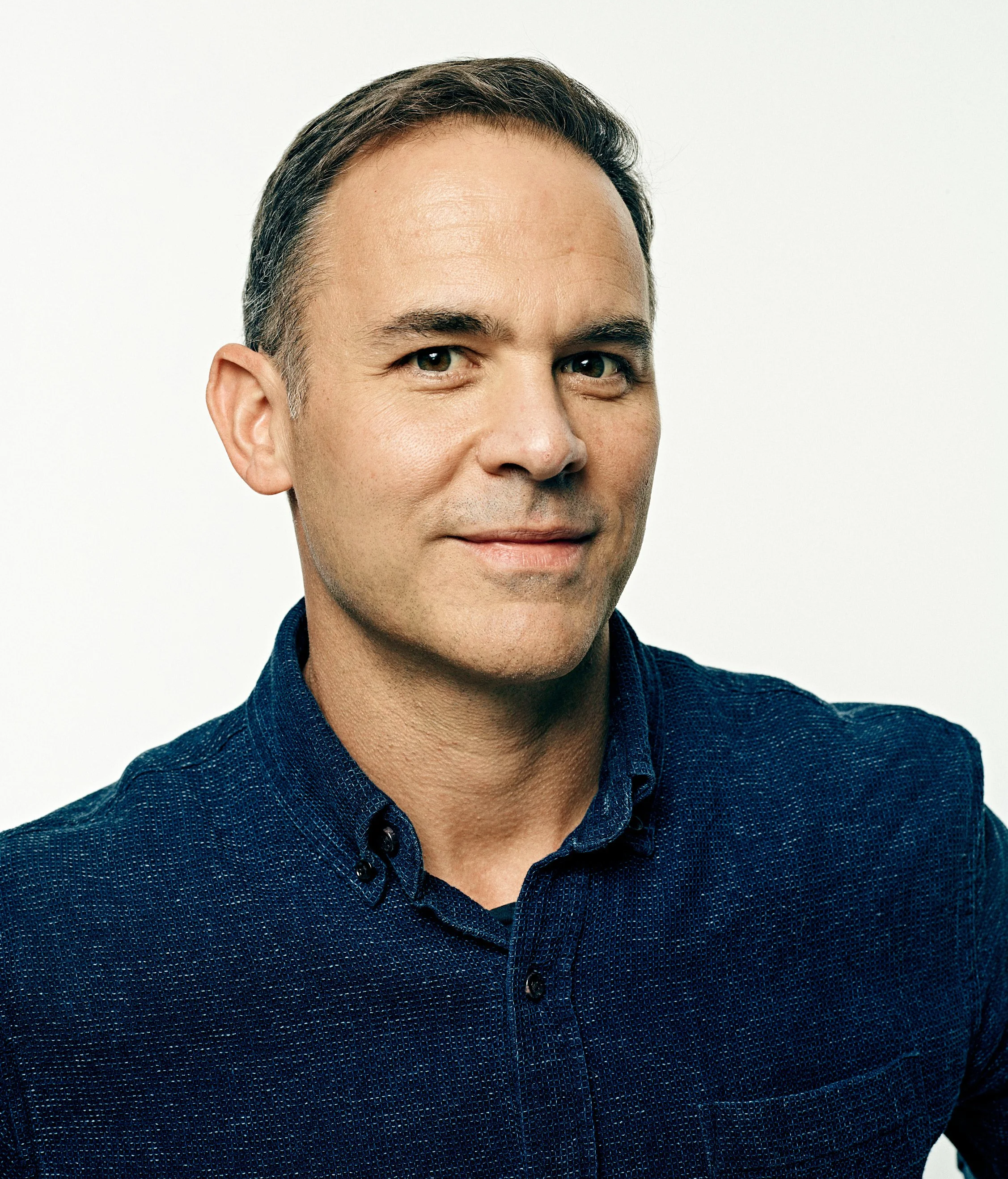
- Gelles in 2025
- Occupations: Journalist, author

David Gelles is an American journalist and author. He is a reporter on The New York Times' climate team and leads the Times' Climate Forward newsletter and events; previously, he was their business reporter who wrote the "Corner Office" column, which features interviews with leading figures in the corporate world, offering insights into leadership and management practices. Gelles is also recognized for his focus on mindfulness in the workplace and corporate America, exploring how these practices impact leadership and employee well-being.

== Books ==
The Man Who Broke Capitalism: How Jack Welch Gutted the Heartland and Crushed the Soul of Corporate America—and How to Undo His Legacy. The book examines former General Electric CEO Jack Welch's influence on American corporate management, arguing that Welch popularized a model emphasizing shareholder returns, cost reduction, layoffs, acquisitions, and stock buybacks.

Dirtbag Billionaire: How Yvon Chouinard Built Patagonia, Made a Fortune, and Gave It All Away The book examines Patagonia founder Yvon Chouinard's business career, the company's environmental activism, and its approach to corporate ownership and philanthropy.

Mindful Work: How Meditation Is Changing Business from the Inside Out The book examines the adoption of meditation and mindfulness programs in workplaces, including examples from companies such as General Mills, Target, Google, and Aetna.

== Awards ==
- 2020: Gerald Loeb Award for Breaking News.
