= Office of the General Counsel for the Department of the Treasury =

U.S. Treasury Department agency

Agency overview
- Jurisdiction: U.S. federal government
- Headquarters: Washington, D.C.
- Agency executive: Rachel Miller, General Counsel (PDO)
- Parent department: United States Department of the Treasury
- Website: home.treasury.gov/about/offices/general-counsel

The Office of General Counsel provides legal and policy advice to the Secretary and other senior Departmental officials. The General Counsel also is the head of the Treasury Legal Division, a separate bureau within the department that includes all legal counsels and staff of the Treasury Departmental Offices and Treasury bureaus (except for the Office of the Comptroller of the Currency and the Offices of the Inspectors General). The office was preceded by the offices of the Comptroller of the Treasury (1789–1817), First Comptroller of the Treasury (1817–1820), Agent of the Treasury (1820–1830), and Solicitor of the Treasury (1830–1934). Brian Morrisey Jr. served as General Counsel from October 2025 until his resignation on May 18, 2026 due to a controversy over the creation of the 'Anti-Weaponization Fund'. He was provisionally replaced by Rachel Miller ex officio of the United States Department of the Treaury Executive Secretariat who is serving in the role in an acting-like capacity restricted to 'performing the delegable duties of' the role.
