= Office of Fiscal Service =

Agency overview
- Jurisdiction: United States Federal Government
- Agency executive: Gary Grippo (Acting), Fiscal Assistant Secretary
- Parent department: United States Treasury
- Website: Official website

The Office of Fiscal Service (OFS) is an agency of the United States federal government in the United States Department of the Treasury. The office is led by the Fiscal Assistant Secretary of the Treasury. The Fiscal Assistant Secretary reports to the United States Secretary of the Treasury through the Under Secretary of the Treasury for Domestic Finance.

Within the Office of Fiscal Service are:

- The Office of Fiscal Operations and Policy
- The Office of Accounting Policy

== Mission ==
The Office of Fiscal Service's mission is to develop policy for and operate the financial infrastructure of the federal government, including payments, collections, cash management, financing, central accounting, and delinquent debt collection. OFS provides policy oversight of the bureaus under it and develops policy on payments, collections, debt financing operations, electronic commerce, government wide accounting, government investment fund management, and other issues. The office also performs two mission critical functions for the Department: it manages the daily cash position of the government and it produces the cash and debt forecasts used to determine the size and timing of the government's financing operations.

The Office represents the Secretary of the Treasury on the Federal Accounting Standards Advisory Board (FASAB), Joint Financial Management Improvement Program (JFMIP), and the Library of Congress and National Archives Trust Fund Boards, is a statutory member of the government wide Chief Financial Officers Council, and serves as liaison to the Federal Reserve System in its capacity as Treasury's fiscal agent.

Under the office is the Bureau of the Fiscal Service (formerly the Financial Management Service and the Bureau of the Public Debt) and the Office of Accounting Policy.

== Office of Fiscal Operations and Policy ==
The Office of Fiscal Operations and Policy, led by the Deputy Assistant Secretary for Fiscal Operations and Policy, oversees the development and implementation of policies relating to the government's cash management, operations, investment and administration of trust funds, payments, collections, and debt collections.

Within the Office of Fiscal Operations and Policy are:

- The Office of Cash and Debt Management, which is responsible for managing the government's daily cash position. The office also produces the cash and debt forecasts used to determine the size and timing of the government's financing operations.
- The Office of Investment Fund Administration, which oversees the operations of Investment Fund administration, and helps ensure that the entire process is operating effectively and efficiently. The office is responsible for enhancing and supporting the existing authorities or responsibilities of offices currently involved in Investment Fund administration, both within and outside the Department of the Treasury.
- The Office of Grants and Asset Management, which oversees special situations projects, including: Treasury's role in approving and overseeing environmental and economic grant making under the Resources and Ecosystems Sustainability, Tourist Opportunities, and Revived Economies of the Gulf Coast States Act (RESTORE Act), stood up in the aftermath of the Deepwater Horizon oil spill, the worse offshore oil spill in U.S. history; as well as performance of financial agents engaged to support programs associated with the 2008 financial crisis: the Troubled Asset Relief Program (TARP) and Small Business Lending Fund, created as part of the Small Business Jobs Act of 2010.

== Office of Accounting Policy ==
The Office of Accounting Policy, led by the Deputy Assistant Secretary for Accounting Policy, oversees the government wide accounting by providing guidance to the Financial Management Service, the prepares of the Financial Report of the United States Government, in conjunction with Office of Management and Budget (OMB) and the United States Chief Financial Officer Council. The Office promotes and facilitates efforts to develop and include more useful, reliable and timely financial information in the Financial Report.
