= David Lebryk =

American government official

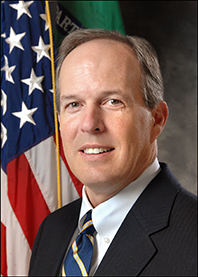
- Official portrait, 2014

Acting United States Secretary of the Treasury
- In office January 20, 2025 – January 28, 2025
- President: Donald Trump
- Preceded by: Janet Yellen
- Succeeded by: Scott Bessent

Acting United States Deputy Secretary of the Treasury
- In office January 20, 2025 – January 31, 2025
- President: Donald Trump
- Preceded by: Wally Adeyemo
- Succeeded by: Dan Katz (acting)

Fiscal Assistant Secretary of the Treasury
- In office July 1, 2014 – January 31, 2025
- President: Barack Obama; Donald Trump; Joe Biden; Donald Trump
- Preceded by: Richard L. Gregg
- Succeeded by: Matthew Garber (acting)

Personal details
- Born: David Allen Lebryk; September 27, 1961 (age 65) Indiana, U.S.
- Education: Harvard University (BA, MPA)

David Allen Lebryk is an American former government official who served as Fiscal Assistant Secretary of the Treasury between 2014 and 2025. For 11 days in January 2025, he served as Acting Secretary of the Treasury and Deputy Secretary of the Treasury.

== Early life and education ==
Lebryk was born September 27, 1961, in Indiana. He graduated from Valparaiso High School, in Valparaiso, Indiana. He studied at the University of Colombo in Sri Lanka. He received his B.A. and M.P.A. from Harvard University.

== Early career ==
In 1989, Lebryk began his career in the U.S. Department of the Treasury as a Presidential Management Intern. He served as an advisor to two deputy secretaries and three Under Secretaries of the Treasury for Domestic Finance.

Lebryk played a role in establishing the Office of the Deputy Assistant Secretary for Human Resources and served as its first Acting Deputy Assistant Secretary. Between 2002 and 2007, he held leadership roles at the United States Mint, serving as Deputy Director and later as Acting Director.

In December 2007, Lebryk joined the Financial Management Service (FMS). Following a consolidation effort he co-led, which merged the Bureau of the Public Debt (BPD) and FMS, he was appointed as the first Commissioner of the Bureau of the Fiscal Service in 2012.

== Fiscal Assistant Secretary ==
On June 30, 2014, he was appointed Fiscal Assistant Secretary, the Department of the Treasury's most senior career position. In this role, he was responsible for developing policy and overseeing the financial infrastructure of the federal government, including payments, collections, debt financing, cash management, reporting and accounting, delinquent debt collection, and shared services.

In 2014, Lebryk received American University's Roger W. Jones Award for Executive Leadership. The Association of Government Accountants presented him with the Elmer Staats Award in 2018 for outstanding leadership, high ethical standards, and innovation, followed by the Frank Greathouse Distinguished Leadership Award in 2020. Lebryk has also been honored with three Presidential Rank Awards. In 2023, he was named among Federal Computer Week's (FCW) list of 100 outstanding individuals. Additionally, he is a recipient of the Alexander Hamilton Award, the U.S. Department of the Treasury's highest honor.

Lebryk was Acting Secretary of the Treasury during January 20–28, 2025, and performed the duties of the Deputy Secretary of the Treasury during January 20–31, 2025.

He had a dispute with Elon Musk and his surrogates from the Department of Government Efficiency who were seeking to access the Bureau of the Fiscal Service payment systems, leading him to resign on January 31, 2025.

In January, 2025, he was awarded the Federal Employee of the Year Award by the Partnership for Public Service, an annual award honoring distinguished service and accomplishments of Federal government workers.

Political offices
Preceded by Wally Adeyemo	United States Deputy Secretary of the Treasury; Acting; 2025	Succeeded by Dan Katz; Acting
Preceded by Janet Yellen	United States Secretary of the Treasury; Acting; 2025	Succeeded by Scott Bessent
