= Fiscal Assistant Secretary of the Treasury =

Highest career official in the U.S. Department of the Treasury

- Incumbent; Gary Grippo; Acting since July 10, 2025
- United States Department of the Treasury
- Appointer: The U.S. secretary of the treasury

The fiscal assistant secretary of the treasury is the highest-ranking career official in the United States Department of the Treasury.

== History ==
According to statute, the fiscal assistant secretary is appointed by the United States secretary of the treasury. The Fiscal Service, which the fiscal assistant secretary heads, includes the Bureau of Government Financial Operations (which since 1984 has been known as the Financial Management Service and the Bureau of the Public Debt.

The fiscal assistant secretary is responsible for the following principal functions:

- (1) Provides general supervision, policy oversight, management, and coordination of what is now the Bureau of the Fiscal Service.
- (2) Oversees the development of policies, programs, and systems for the collection, disbursement, management and security of public monies in the United States and in foreign countries and the related governmentwide accounting and reporting for such funds.
- (3) Oversees the development of policies, programs, and systems for financing and accounting for the public debt.
- (4) Provides general supervision and policy oversight of the Department's role as lead agency in improving cash management, credit administration, debt collection and financial management systems on a governmentwide basis.
- (5) Provides policy advice and general oversight regarding international cash management activities and improvements, including agreements to purchase foreign currencies and the holding and disbursement of these funds.
- (6) Ensures the timely consolidation and publication of information on the Federal Government's financial operations and financial position for use by decision-makers in the Government and in private sector financial markets.
- (7) Directs the implementation of security enhancements to ensure the authentication and integrity of data affecting electronic funds transfers.
- (8) Oversees the administration and investment of the Federal Government accounts and trust funds.
- (9) Oversees the management of the Treasury's daily cash position and the investment of excess operating cash balances.
- (10) Provides estimates of the Treasury's future cash and debt position for use by the Department in connection with its financing activities and other financial operations.
- (11) Provides direction and oversight of the performance of fiscal agency functions by the Federal Reserve banks as fiscal agents of the Treasury.
- (12) Approves new and revised principles and standards and system designs for Treasury's fiscal accounting systems operated and maintained by the Financial Management Service and Bureau of the Public Debt, and coordinates efforts to review, improve and report such systems in accordance with Section 4 of the Federal Managers' Financial Integrity Act, Pub. L. 97-255 (31 U.S.C. 3512(d)(2)(B)).
- (13) Approves, in accordance with applicable Treasury directives, regulations pertaining to the Government securities market and participates in the development of policy issues affecting the liquidity, integrity and efficiency of the market.
- (14) Provides policy advice to the under secretary (international affairs) regarding terms and conditions of agreements for borrowing from foreign international monetary authorities.
- (15) Represents the secretary in directing the Treasury's participation in the Joint Financial Management Improvement Program for improvement of all aspects of financial management in the Government.
- (16) Represents the secretary on various interdepartmental commissions, boards, and committees.

== List of Fiscal Assistant Secretaries (incomplete) ==
Name	Assumed office	Left office	Secretary appointed by	Administration served under
Edward F. Bartelt	1945	1955	Fred M. Vinson	Harry S. Truman
Edward F. Bartelt	1945	1955	Fred M. Vinson	Dwight D. Eisenhower
Vacant from 1955-1972				John F. Kennedy
Vacant from 1955-1972				Lyndon B. Johnson
John K. Carlock	1972	1974	George P. Shultz	Richard M. Nixon
David Mosso	1975	1977	William E. Simon	Richard M. Nixon
David Mosso	1975	1977	William E. Simon	Gerald Ford
Paul H. Taylor	July 5, 1978	1986	W. Michael Blumenthal	Jimmy Carter
Paul H. Taylor	July 5, 1978	1986	W. Michael Blumenthal	Ronald W. Reagan
Gerald Murphy	1986	1998	James Baker	Ronald W. Reagan
Gerald Murphy	1986	1998	James Baker	George H. W. Bush
Gerald Murphy	1986	1998	James Baker	Bill J. Clinton
Donald V. Hammond	1998	2007	Robert Rubin	Bill J. Clinton
Donald V. Hammond	1998	2007	Robert Rubin	George W. Bush
Kenneth E. Carfine	2007	2010	Henry Paulson	George W. Bush
Richard L. Gregg	May 12, 2010	June 30, 2014	Timothy Geithner	Barack H. Obama
David Lebryk	July 1, 2014	January 31, 2025	Jack Lew	Barack H. Obama
David Lebryk	July 1, 2014	January 31, 2025	Jack Lew	Barack H. Obama
David Lebryk	July 1, 2014	January 31, 2025	Jack Lew	Donald J. Trump
David Lebryk	July 1, 2014	January 31, 2025	Jack Lew	Joe Biden
Matthew Garber; Acting	January 31, 2025	February 7, 2025	Scott Bessent	Donald J. Trump
Tom Krause; Acting	February 7, 2025	June 6, 2025	Scott Bessent	Donald J. Trump
Gary Grippo; Acting	July 10, 2025	Present	Scott Bessent	Donald J. Trump
