= Series E bond =

U.S. government bond

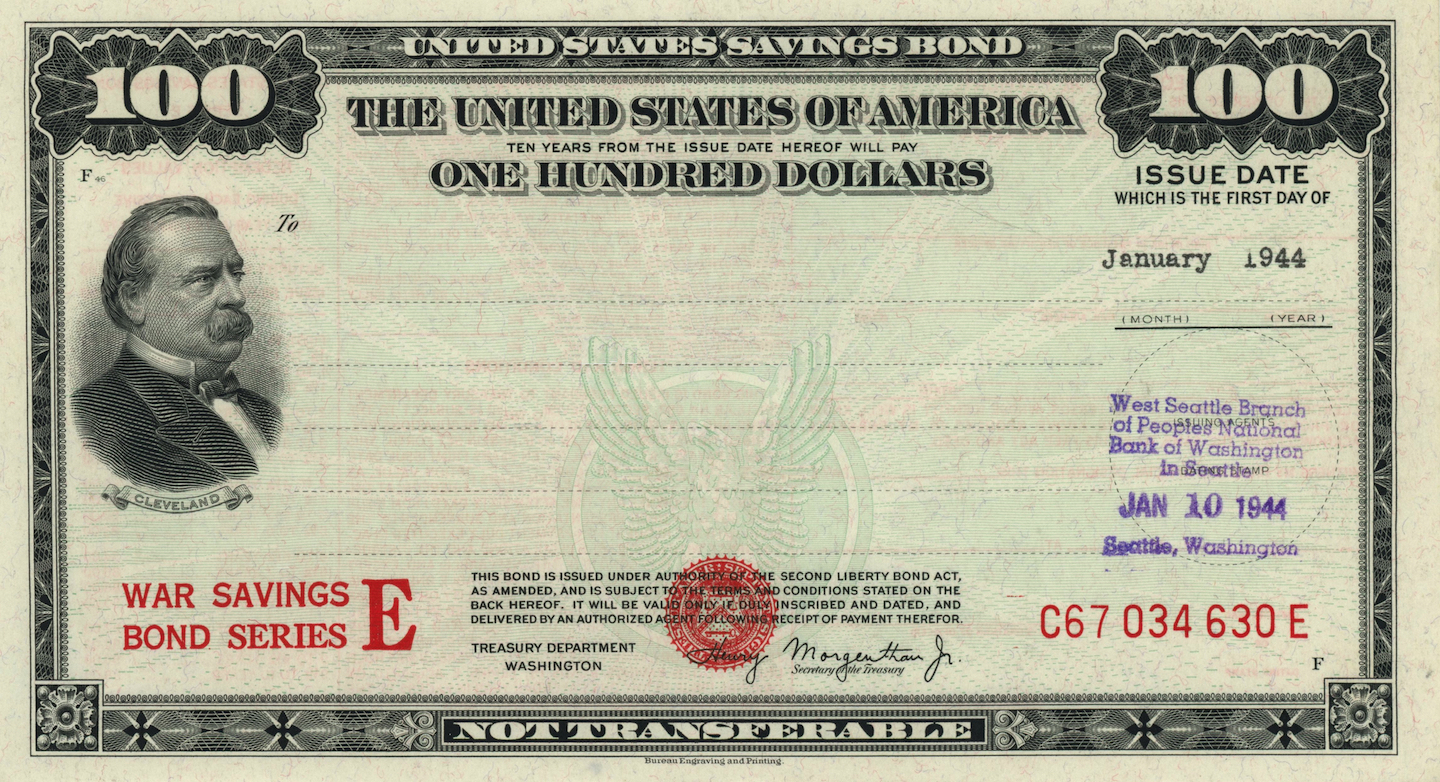
$100 Series E bond (1944)

Series E United States Savings Bonds were government bonds marketed by the United States Department of the Treasury as war bonds during World War II from 1941 to 1945. After the war, they continued to be offered as retail investments until 1980, when they were replaced by other savings bonds.

== History ==
President Franklin D. Roosevelt buys the first Series E bond (May 1, 1941)

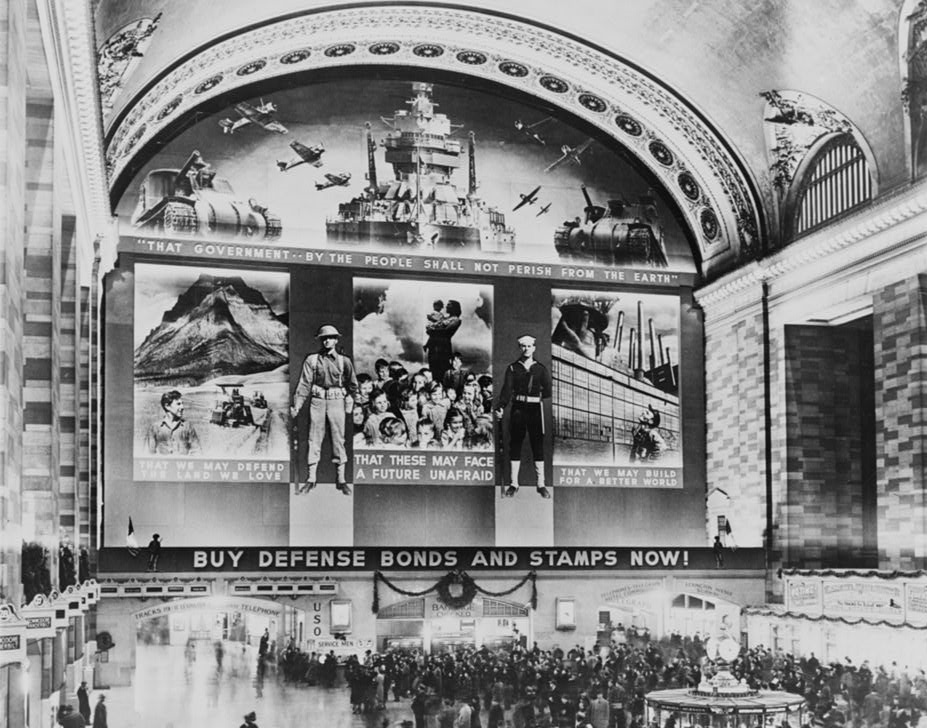
Photo mural promoting the purchase of Defense Bonds, in the concourse of Grand Central Terminal (December 1941)

The first savings bonds, Series A, were issued in 1935 to encourage saving during the Great Depression. They were marketed as a safe investment that was accessible to everyone. They were followed by series B, C, and D bonds over the next few years.

Marketed as a defense savings bond, the first Series E bond was sold to President Franklin D. Roosevelt on May 1, 1941, by Secretary of the Treasury Henry Morgenthau. After the December 1941 attack on Pearl Harbor brought the United States into World War II, Series E bonds became known as war bonds.

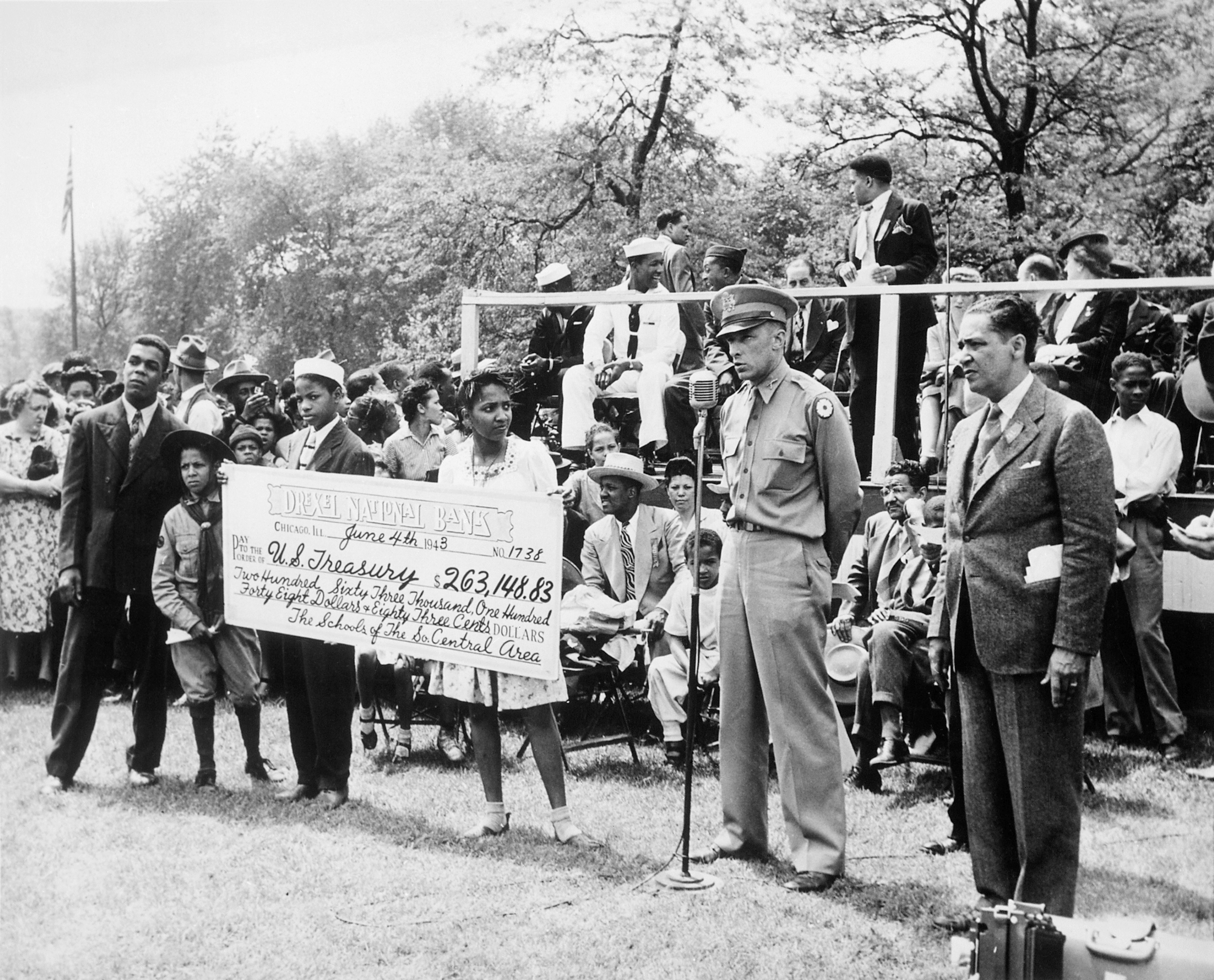
On June 4, 1943, students of the south-central district of the Chicago Public Schools purchased $263,148.83 in war bonds—enough to finance 125 jeeps, two pursuit planes and a motorcycle.

The "drive" technique used during World War I was replaced in part by a continual campaign using a payroll deduction plan. However, eight different drives were conducted during the campaign. In total, the overall campaign raised $185.7 billion from 85 million Americans, more than in any other country during the war. Li'l Abner creator Al Capp created Small Fry, a weekly newspaper comic strip whose purpose was to sell Series E bonds in support of the Treasury.

=== Drives ===
Of the $185.7 billion raised during the continual campaign, a total of $156.4 billion was raised during the eight specific drives:

Poster for the Second War Loan Drive (April 12 – May 1, 1943)

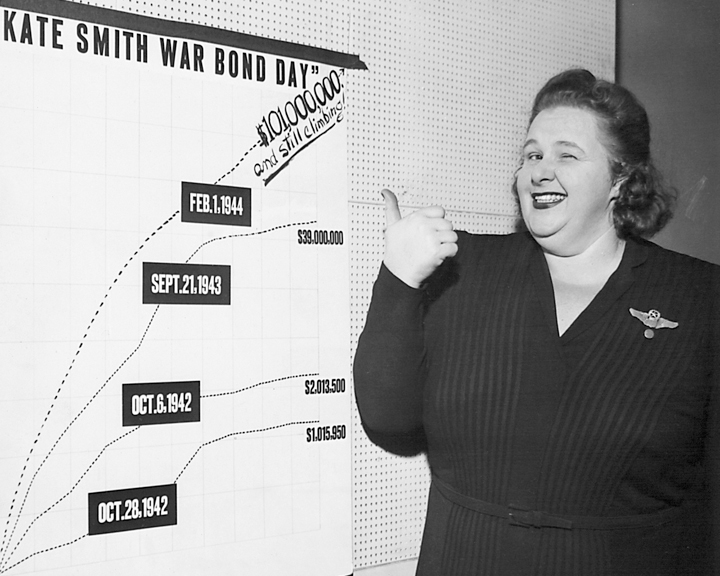
Kate Smith in September 1944: "No single show-business figure even approached her as a seller of War Bonds during World War II", wrote The New York Times. Her grand total exceeded $600 million.

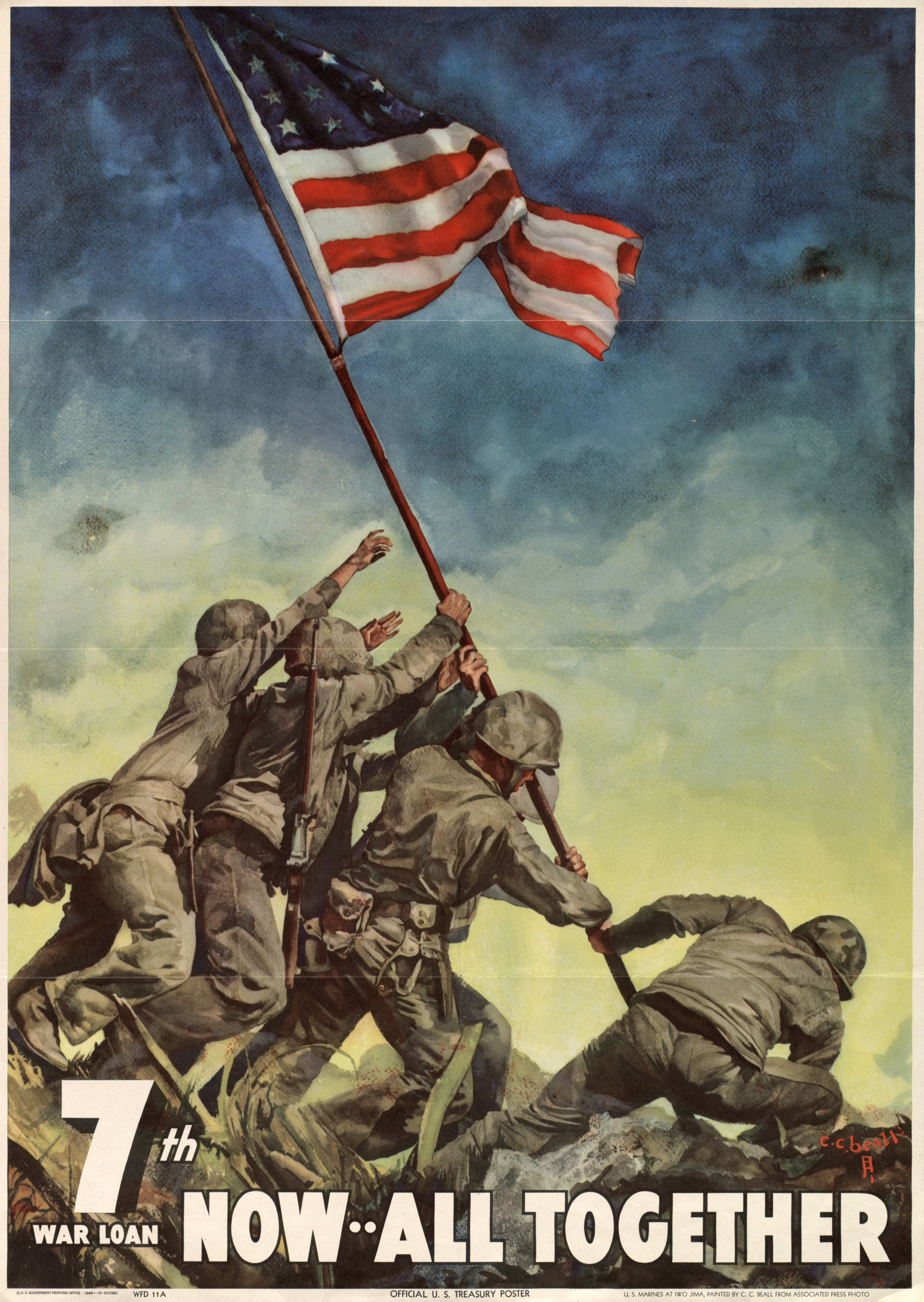
C. C. Beall poster for the Seventh War Loan Drive (May 14 – June 30, 1945)

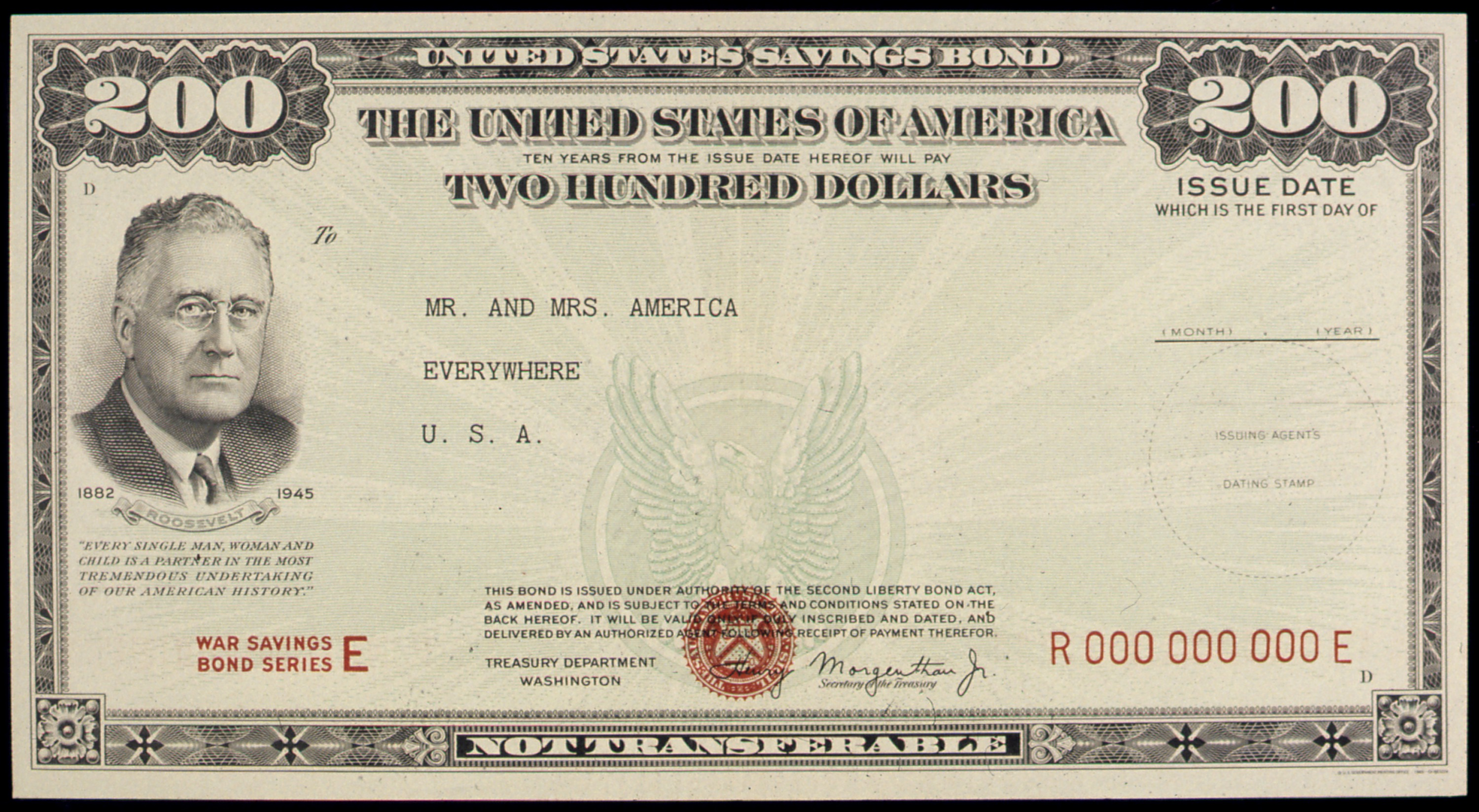
In memory of Roosevelt, a special $200 Series E bond was made available at the beginning of the Eighth War Loan Drive, called the Victory Loan (October 29, 1945).

- First War Loan Drive – November 30 through December 23, 1942. The initial goal was $9 billion; the drive raised $13 billion. However, only $1.6 billion was raised from individuals; corporations and commercial banks accounted for the vast majority of the funds raised.
- Second War Loan Drive – 20 days, from April 12 through May 1, 1943. The initial goal was $13 billion; the drive raised $18.5 billion. Individual purchases doubled over the previous drive, due in large part to the $4.5 million and $170,000 of advertising contributed by newspapers and magazines.
- Third War Loan Drive – September 9 through October 1, 1943. The initial goal was $15 billion, which would require a doubling of the bond sales from the prior drive, with at least 40 million of the 130 million American citizens needing to purchase a $100 war bond. President Franklin D. Roosevelt addressed the nation via one of his fireside chats on September 8. Singer Kate Smith raised $39 million during a September 21 CBS broadcast, part of the $600 million she raised on a series of one day broadcasts throughout the war. Final sales were $19 billion.
- Fourth War Loan Drive – January 18 through February 15, 1944. The initial goal was $14 billion, and the drive was targeted towards farmers and women. A Quiz Kids radio broadcast from Syria Mosque in Pittsburgh raised $5 million. Kate Smith again proved a popular draw, raising $101 million during a February 1 broadcast. Final sales were $16.7 billion, with nearly 70 million separate bonds sold.
- Fifth War Loan Drive – June 12 through July 8, 1944. On FDR's recommendation, Morgenthau asked Orson Welles to lead the Fifth War Loan Drive, which opened with a one-hour radio show on all four networks, broadcast from Texarkana, Texas. Including a statement by the President, the program defined the causes of the war and encouraged Americans to buy $16 billion in bonds. Additional war loan drive broadcasts took place June 14 from the Hollywood Bowl, and June 16 from Soldier Field, Chicago. Sales were $20.6 billion.
- Sixth War Loan Drive – November 2 through December 16, 1944. The drive raised $21.6 billion.
- Seventh War Loan Drive – May 14 (just days after Victory in Europe Day) through June 30, 1945. Officials were concerned that the defeat of Germany might lessen bond sales. The amount raised during the six-week drive was over $26 billion.
- Eighth War Loan (Victory Loan) Drive – October 29 through December 8, 1945. The goal was $11 billion. More than $21 billion was raised.

=== After World War II ===
Series E Bonds continued to be sold as part of the United States Savings Bonds program until June 1980, when they were replaced by Series EE bonds.

== Financial terms ==
Bonds issued from 1941 to November 1965 accrued interest for 40 years; those issued from December 1965 to June 1980, for 30 years. They were generally issued at 75 cents per dollar of face value, maturing at par value in a specified number of years that fluctuated with the rate of interest. Denominations available were $25, $50, $75, $100, $200, $500, $1,000, $5,000 and $10,000. Series E bonds were not transferable, and were issued only as registered paper certificates. The guaranteed minimum investment yield for the bonds was 4 percent, compounded semiannually. Interest was exempt from state and local taxes, but was subject to federal taxes. Series E bonds were sold at 75% of face value and had a 2.9% interest rate compounded semiannually.
