= Richard L. Gregg =

U.S. Fiscal Assistant Secretary of the Treasury

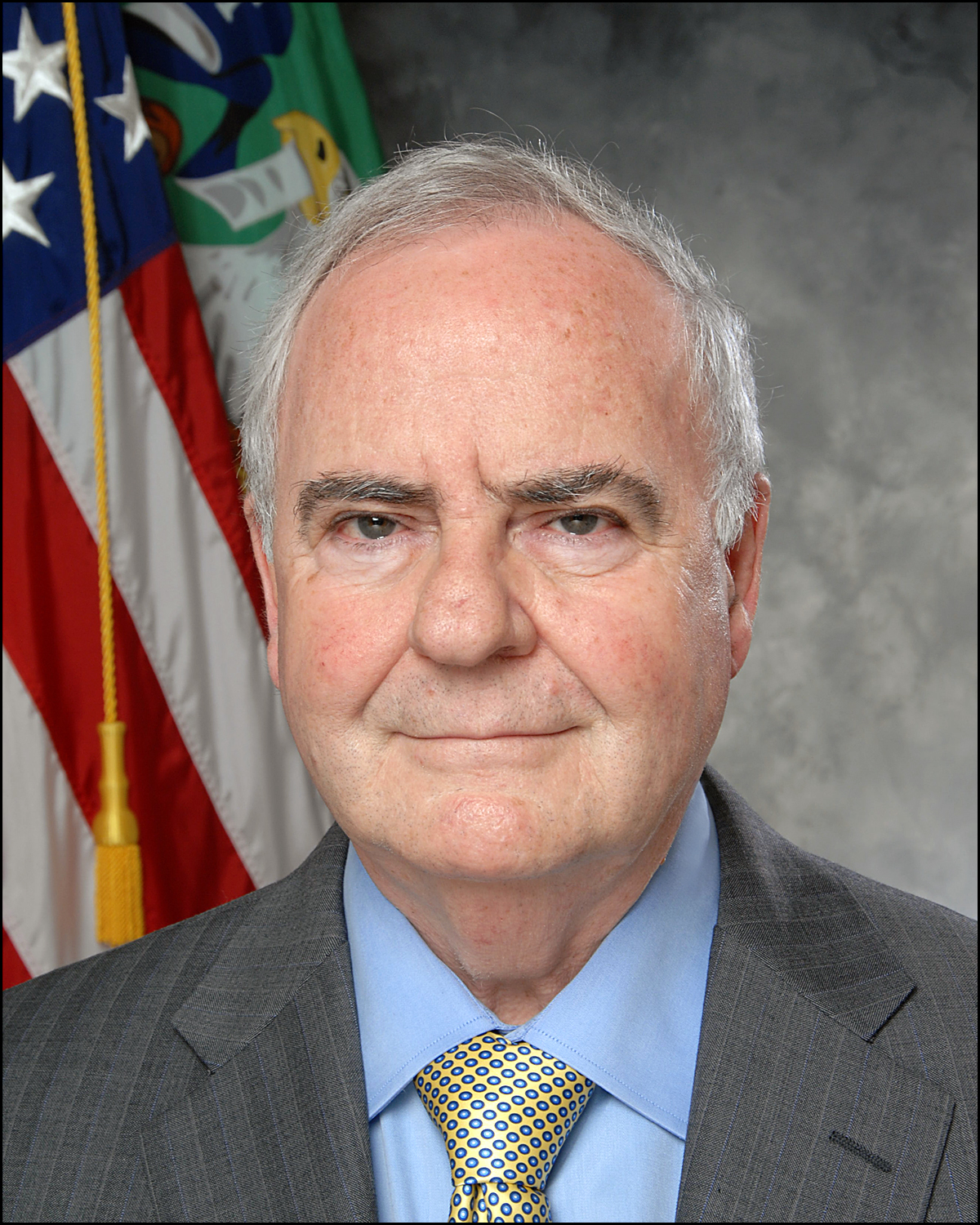
Richard L. Gregg

Richard L. "Dick" Gregg is an official in the United States Department of the Treasury who served as Fiscal Assistant Secretary of the Treasury from May 12, 2010 to June 30, 2014.

== Biography ==
Richard L. Gregg was raised in Harrold, South Dakota. He was educated at the University of South Dakota, receiving a B.S. in political science in 1969. He joined the United States Department of the Treasury in 1970, beginning a long career there. He later went on to attend the George Washington University, receiving an M.S. in public administration in 1971, and the George Washington University Law School, receiving a J.D. in 1977.

After working as Assistant Commissioner in the Office of Financing, Gregg was Deputy Commissioner Public Debt the Bureau of the Public Debt from 1981 to 1987. He served as Commissioner of Public Debt, the head of the Bureau of the Public Debt from 1987 to 1997. From 1997 to 2006, he was Commissioner of the Financial Management Service. Gregg retired from the Treasury Department on May 30, 2006.

On May 12, 2010, United States Secretary of the Treasury Timothy Geithner named Gregg Fiscal Assistant Secretary of the Treasury and Gregg held that office until June 30, 2014.
