= United States Savings Bonds =

Debt issued by the government of the United States

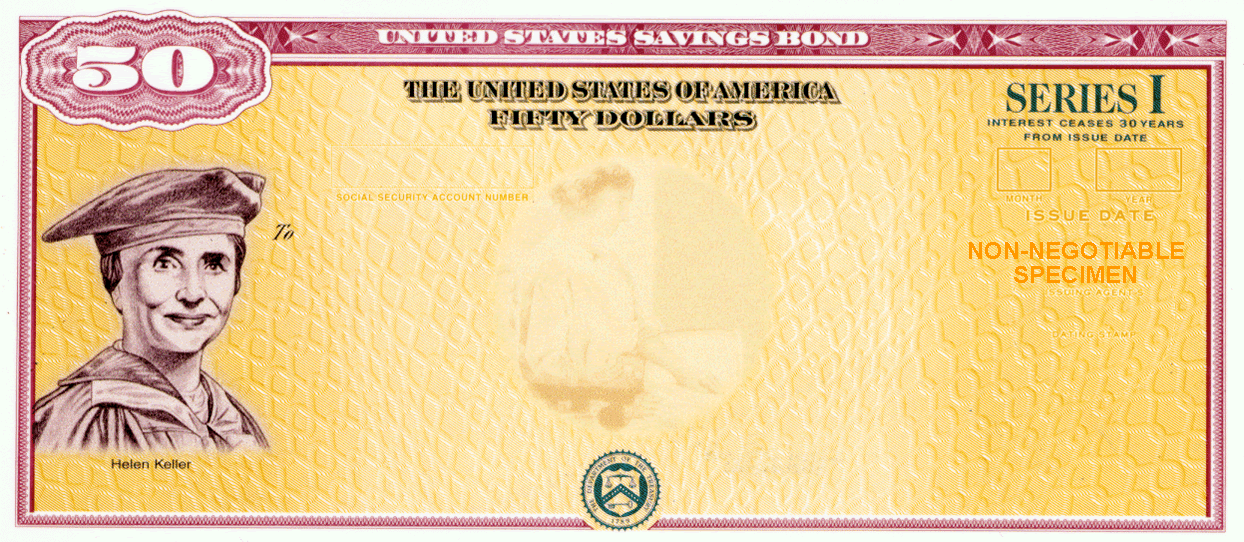
A $50 Series I United States Savings Bond certificate, which features Helen Keller

United States Savings Bonds are debt securities issued by the United States Department of the Treasury to help pay for the U.S. government's borrowing needs. They are considered one of the safest investments because they are backed by the full faith and credit of the United States government. The savings bonds are nonmarketable treasury securities issued to the public, which means they cannot be publicly traded or otherwise transferred. They are redeemable only by the original purchaser, a recipient (for bonds purchased as gifts) or a beneficiary in case of the original holder's death.

== History ==
President Franklin D. Roosevelt buys the first Series E bond (May 1, 1941)

On February 1, 1935, President Franklin D. Roosevelt signed legislation that allowed the U.S. Department of the Treasury to sell a new type of security, called the savings bond, to encourage saving during the Great Depression. The first Series A savings bond was issued a month later, with a face value of $25. They were marketed as a safe investment that was accessible to everyone. Series B, C, and D bonds followed over the next few years.

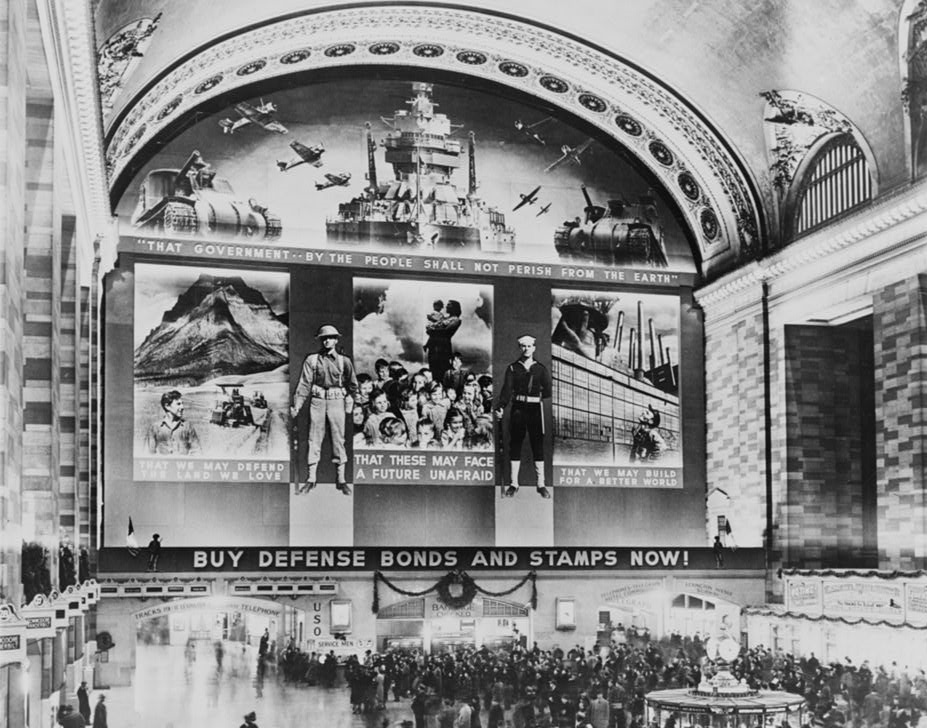
Photo mural promoting the purchase of Defense Bonds, in the concourse of Grand Central Terminal (December 1941)

Series E bonds, referred to as Defense Bonds, were a major source of financing in the period just before U.S. entry into World War II. On April 30, 1941, Roosevelt purchased the first Series E bond from Treasury Secretary Henry Morgenthau Jr.; the next day, they were made available to the public. After the attack on Pearl Harbor, Defense Bonds became known as War Bonds. Stamps featuring a Minuteman statue design in denominations of 10¢, 25¢, 50¢, $1, and $5 were also sold to be collected in booklets which, when filled, could be exchanged to purchase interest-bearing Series E bonds. All the revenue received from the bonds went directly to support the war effort.

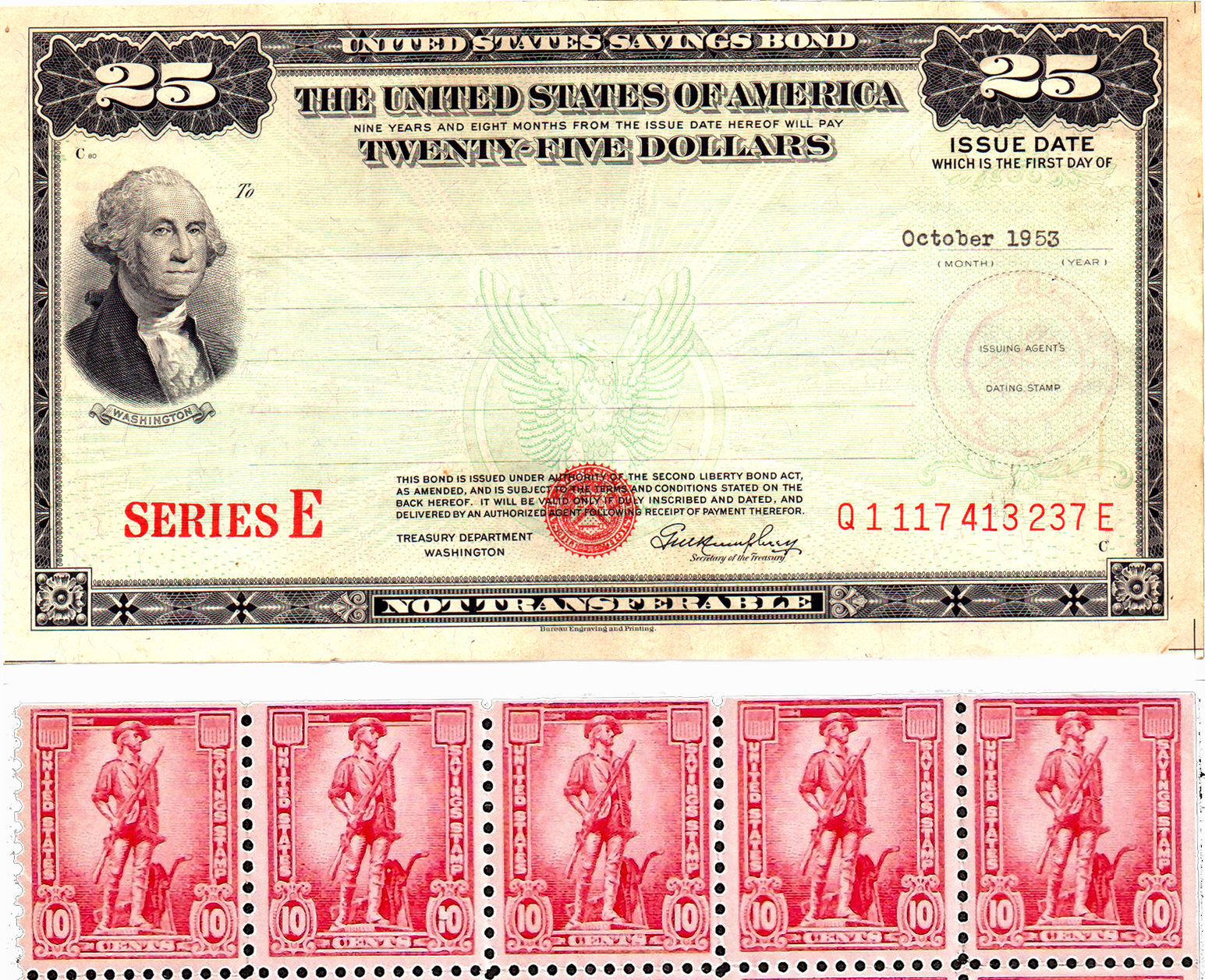
Post WWII $25 Series E US Savings Bond (1953) and strip of 10¢ US Savings Stamps

After the war ended, savings bonds became popular with families, with purchasers waiting to redeem them so the bonds would grow in value. To help sustain post-war sales, they were advertised on television, films, and commercials. When John F. Kennedy was president, he encouraged Americans to purchase them, which stimulated a large enrollment in savings bonds. By 1976, President Ford helped celebrate the 35th anniversary of the U.S. savings bond program.

In 1990, Congress created the Education Savings Bond program which helped Americans finance a college education. A bond purchased on or after January 1, 1990, is tax-free (subject to income limitations) if used to pay tuition and fees at an eligible institution.

In 2002, the Treasury Department started changing the savings bond program by lowering interest rates and closing its marketing offices. As of January 1, 2012, financial institutions no longer sell paper savings bonds. That year, the Department of the Treasury's Bureau of the Public Debt made savings bonds available for purchasing and redeeming online. U.S. savings bonds are now only sold in electronic form at a Department of the Treasury website, TreasuryDirect.

As of 2023, redeeming paper savings bonds is very difficult, as most banks decline to do so. The New York Times reported that the reasons banks gave for this were "the equivalent of 'sorry, we just don’t feel like it.'" Where bonds are accepted, redeeming them can be a very onerous and time-consuming process.

== Currently issued bonds ==
There are two types of savings bonds currently offered by the Treasury, Series EE and Series I.

=== Series EE ===
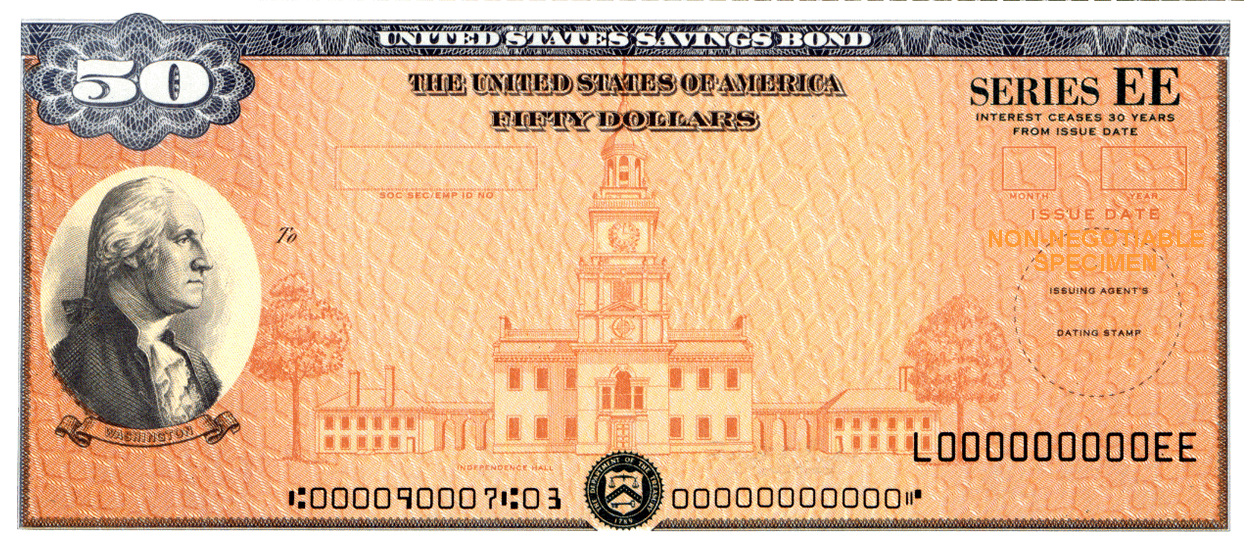
$50 Series EE savings bond featuring George Washington

Series EE bonds are guaranteed to double in value over the purchase price when they mature 20 years from issuance, though they continue to earn interest for a total of 30 years. Interest accrues monthly, and is compounded semiannually, that is, becomes part of the principal for future interest earning calculations. If a bond's compounded interest does not meet the guaranteed doubling of the purchase price, Treasury will make a one-time adjustment to the maturity value at 20 years, giving it an effective rate of 3.5%. The bond will continue to earn the fixed rate for 10 more years. All interest is paid when the holder cashes the bond.

For bonds issued from May 1997 through April 2005, the interest rate is a variable rate recomputed every six months at 90% of the average five-year Treasury yield for the preceding six months. The rate now applied to bonds issued from May 1995 through April 1997 is 85% of the six-month average of five-year Treasury yields, and bonds issued before May 1995 earned the higher of a guaranteed rate or a market rate of 85% of six-month averages of five-year Treasury yields. Bonds issued in May 2005 or later pay a fixed interest rate for the life of the bond. Paper EE bonds, last sold in 2011, could be purchased for half their face value; for example, a $100 bond could be purchased for $50, but would only reach its full $100 value at maturity.

=== Series I ===
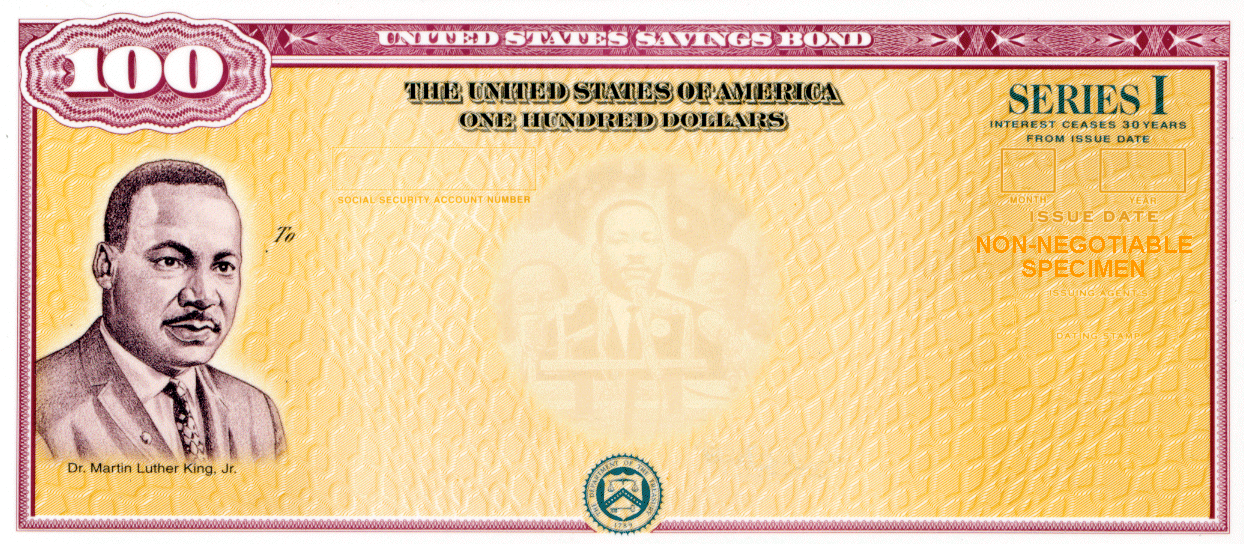
$100 Series I US Savings Bond, which features Martin Luther King Jr

In 1998, the Treasury introduced the Series I bonds which have a variable yield based on inflation. The Treasury currently issues Series I bonds electronically in any denomination down to the penny, with a minimum purchase of $25. As of January 1, 2025, paper bonds are no longer an option for receiving a federal income tax refund. The paper bonds were issued in denominations of $50, $100, $200, $500, and $1,000, featuring portraits of Helen Keller, Martin Luther King Jr., Chief Joseph, George C. Marshall, and Albert Einstein, respectively. Earlier discontinued denominations included $75, $5,000, and $10,000 featuring Hector P. Garcia, Marian Anderson, and Spark Matsunaga. Gulf Coast Recovery Bonds are a special issue of I series issued from March 29, 2006, through September 30, 2007, in order to encourage public support for hurricane recovery, including from Katrina, in the affected states.

The interest rate for Series I bonds consists of two components. The first is a fixed rate which will remain constant over the life of the bond; the second component is a variable rate adjusted every six months from the time the bond is purchased based on the current inflation rate. The fixed rate is determined by the Treasury Department, which has not disclosed how that rate is set. The variable component is based on the non-seasonally adjusted Consumer Price Index for urban areas (CPI-U) for a six-month period ending one month prior to the rate adjustment. Specifically the variable rate is calculated by looking at the percent change over the previous six months of available data, and multiplying the percent change by two to annualize the rate. New rates are published on May 1 and November 1 of each year. For example, on November 1, 2021, the most recent CPI-U data that was available was from September 2021, where the non-seasonally adjusted CPI-U was 274.310. Six months earlier, in March 2021 the CPI-U was 264.877. Thus, the percent change was 3.56%. Multiplying this by 2 yields the variable component of 7.12%.

As an example, if someone purchases a bond in February, the fixed portion of the rate will remain the same throughout the life of the bond, but the inflation-indexed component will be based on the rate published the previous November. In August, six months after the purchase month, the inflation component will change to the rate that was published in May. During times of deflation, the negative inflation-indexed portion can drop the combined rate below the fixed portion, but the combined rate cannot go below 0% and the bond cannot lose value. Like Series EE bonds, interest accrues monthly and is compounded to the principal semiannually.

The highest the fixed rate has ever been is 3.60%, set on May 1, 2000, for bonds issued for the following six months. The highest inflation rate was 4.81%, set on May 1, 2022, for the six-month period that followed.

=== Terms ===
Series EE bonds and Series I bonds have a life of 30 years and cease accruing interest after maturity, but they can be redeemed any time after 12 months from purchase. Treasury has the authority to waive the 12-month holding period for bondholders residing in areas of natural disaster. There is a penalty of three months' interest if they are redeemed before five years. Tax on the interest can be deferred until the bond is redeemed. Interest on redeemed bonds is subject to federal income tax but not state or local income taxes.

The annual purchase limit for electronic Series EE and Series I savings bonds is $10,000 for each series. This limit applies to both purchases and bonds received as gifts (except that bonds received as a beneficiary do not count against the limit). For paper Series I Savings Bonds purchased through IRS tax refunds the purchase limit was $5,000, in addition to the online purchase limit.

Individuals who own either type of bond must have a Social Security number and be either a United States citizen, a legal United States resident, or a civilian employee of the United States regardless of country of residence. Trusts, estates, corporations, partnerships, and other entities may own Series EE bonds if they have a Social Security Number or Employer Identification Number. Trusts and estates may own Series I bonds in some cases.

== Historical bonds ==
The U.S. Treasury previously issued bonds in a variety of series, some of which still earn interest today. Series A was issued only during 1935, Series B during 1936, Series C from 1937 to 1938, Series D from 1939 to 1941, Series E from 1941 to 1980, Series F and G from 1941 to 1952, Series H from 1952 to 1979 when it was replaced by Series HH (itself discontinued in 2004), Series J and K from 1952 to 1957, and "Freedom Shares" Savings Notes from 1967 to 1970. In addition, there were special designs for some paper bonds issued during their lifetimes, notably a version of the Series E bonds issued from 1975 to 1976 labeled as a "Bicentennial Bond" and Series EE bonds sold from December 2001 to 2011 labeled as a "Patriot Bond."

=== Series A, B, C, and D ===
The Treasury began issuing savings bonds in March 1935, with each of the first four series released sequentially without overlap and under similar terms. These bonds were purchased at 75% of their face value and would mature after 10 years. The interest earned would not be taxed for Series A, B, and C, as well as Series D bonds issued before March 1941. The bonds were issued in denominations of $25, $50, $100, $500, and $1,000, and can still be redeemed for face value today.

=== Series E ===
Series E bonds were introduced in 1941 as war bonds but continued to be a retail investment long after the end of World War II. Issued at a discount of the face value, the bonds could be redeemed for the full face value when the bond matured after a number of years that varied with the interest rate at the time of issuance. If not redeemed at maturity, the bonds would continue earning interest for a total of 40 years if issued before December 1965, or for 30 years if issued in December 1965 or later. Series E was replaced by Series EE bonds in 1980, and the last issued Series E bonds ceased earning interest in 2010.

=== Series F and G ===
Introduced around the same time as Series E in 1941, the Series F and G bonds offered alternative investment strategies until both were discontinued in April 1952. Series F could be purchased at 74% of the face value and would mature in 12 years with no further interest. Series G bonds were sold at face value and would earn interest paid by check every six months until maturity after 12 years. Both series were issued in denominations of $100, $500, $1,000, $5,000, and $10,000, with Series F also available as $25.

=== Series H, J, and K ===
Introduced in May and June 1952 to replace Series F and G, the next three series were H, J, and K (skipping the letter I). Series H was issued at face value and earned interest that was paid every six months until maturity approximately 30 years later. Series J was sold at 72% of face value and matured after 12 years with no further interest. Series K was sold at face value and would earn interest paid every six months until maturity 12 years later. Series J and K were discontinued in April 1957 while Series H lasted until December 1979, with a replacement Series HH introduced in January 1980.

=== Series HH ===
Series HH bonds were sold from 1980 to 2004, and served as a "current income" bond replacing the older Series H. Unlike Series EE and I bonds, they did not increase in value but instead paid earned interest every six months for 20 years directly to the holder. The interest rate of a Series HH bond was set at purchase and remained that rate for 10 years. After 10 years the rate could be adjusted, with interest paid at the new rate for the remaining 10 year life of the bond. After 20 years, the bond would be redeemed for its original purchase price. Issuance of Series HH bonds ended August 31, 2004. Although sales ceased in 2004, Series HH bonds continued to earn interest for 20 years after sale, meaning the last bonds matured in 2024.

== Annual poster contest ==
From 1991 through 2000, the Treasury's Bureau of Public Debt announced an Annual U.S. Savings Bonds Student Poster Contest each fall to promote the sale of bonds with a specified theme. Each spring, nearly $100,000 was distributed to winners in grades four through six across all fifty states, District of Columbia, and Puerto Rico. Winners were chosen by state art councils, the news media, sponsors, and volunteers based on criteria of originality, poster design, and visual appeal. The first-place winning artwork from each state was exhibited in Washington D.C., and photographs of the winning posters with names of the artists and their schools were displayed in major airports across the country and the treasury website.
