= Capital market =

Financial market

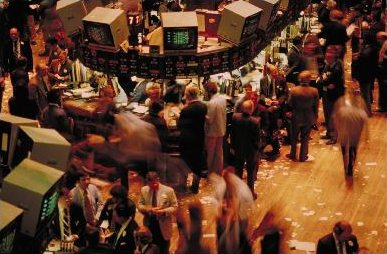
The trading floor of the New York Stock Exchange, one of the largest secondary capital markets in the world. Most of the trades on the New York Stock Exchange are executed electronically, but its hybrid structure allows some trading to be done face to face on the floor.

A capital market is a financial market in which long-term debt (over a year) or equity-backed securities are bought and sold, in contrast to a money market where short-term debt is bought and sold. Capital markets channel the wealth of savers to those who can put it to long-term productive use, such as companies or governments making long-term investments. (Note: The idea of governments making investments may be less familiar than the case involving companies. A government can make investments that are expected to develop a nation's economy, by improving a nation's physical infrastructure, such as by building roads, or by improving public education.) Financial regulators like the Bank of England (BoE) and the U.S. Securities and Exchange Commission (SEC) oversee capital markets to protect investors against fraud, among other duties.

Transactions on capital markets are generally managed by entities within the financial sector or the treasury departments of governments and corporations, but some can be accessed directly by the public. As an example, in the United States, any American citizen with an internet connection can create an account with TreasuryDirect and use it to buy bonds in the primary market. However, sales to individuals form only a small fraction of the total volume of bonds sold. Various private companies provide browser-based platforms that allow individuals to buy shares and sometimes even bonds in the secondary markets. There are many thousands of such systems, most serving only small parts of the overall capital markets. Entities hosting the systems include investment banks, stock exchanges and government departments. Physically, the systems are hosted all over the world, though they tend to be concentrated in financial centres like London, New York, and Hong Kong.

== Definition ==
A capital market can be either a primary market or a secondary market. In a primary market, new stock or bond issues are sold to investors, often via a mechanism known as underwriting. The main entities seeking to raise long-term funds on the primary capital markets are governments (which may be municipal, local or national) and business enterprises (companies). Governments issue only bonds, whereas companies often issue both equity and bonds. The main entities purchasing the bonds or stock on primary markets include pension funds, hedge funds, sovereign wealth funds, and less commonly wealthy individuals and investment banks trading on their own behalf. In the secondary market, existing securities are sold and bought among investors or traders, usually on an exchange, over-the-counter, or elsewhere. The existence of secondary markets increases the willingness of investors in primary markets, as they know they are likely to be able to swiftly cash out their investments if the need arises.

A second important division falls between the stock markets (for equity securities, also known as shares, where investors acquire ownership of companies) and the bond markets (where investors become creditors).

=== Contrast with money markets ===
The money markets are used to raise short-term finance; including loans that are expected to be paid back as early as overnight. In contrast, the "capital markets" are used to raise long-term finance, in the form of shares/equities, and loans that are not expected to be fully paid back for at least a year.

Funds borrowed from money markets are typically used for general operating expenses, to provide liquid assets for brief periods. For example, a company may have inbound payments from customers that have not yet cleared, but need immediate cash to pay its employees. But when a company borrows from the primary capital markets, often the purpose is to invest in additional physical capital goods, which will be used to help increase its income. It can take many months or years before the investment generates sufficient return to pay back its cost, and hence the finance is long term.

Together, money markets and capital markets form the financial markets, as the term is narrowly understood. (Note: Note however that the term "financial markets" is also often used to refer all the different sorts of markets in the financial sector, including those that are not directly concerned with raising finance, such as commodity markets and foreign exchange.) The capital market is concerned with long-term finance. In the widest sense, it consists of a series of channels through which the savings of individuals and institutions are made available for industrial and commercial enterprises and public authorities. This process of channeling savings into productive investments is crucial for economic growth and development. Moreover, capital markets provide opportunities for both individuals and institutions to diversify their investments, thereby managing risk and potentially enhancing returns over the long term.

=== Capital market versus bank loans ===
Normal bank lending is not usually classed as a capital market transaction, even when loans are extended for a period longer than a year. First, these bank loans are not securitized (i.e. they are not packaged into a resaleable security like a share or bond that can be traded on the markets). Second, lending by banks is more heavily regulated than capital market lending. Third, bank depositors tend to be more risk-averse than capital market investors. These three differences all act to limit institutional lending as a source of finance. Two additional differences, this time favoring lending by banks, are that banks are more accessible for small and medium-sized companies, and that they have the ability to create money as they lend. In the 20th century, most company finance apart from share issues was raised by bank loans. But since about 1980 there has been an ongoing trend for disintermediation, where large and creditworthy companies have found they effectively have to pay out less interest if they borrow directly from capital markets rather than from banks. The tendency for companies to borrow from capital markets instead of banks has been especially strong in the United States. According to the Financial Times, capital markets overtook bank lending as the leading source of long-term finance in 2009, which reflects the risk aversion and bank regulation due to the 2008 financial crisis.

Compared to the United States, companies in the European Union have a greater reliance on bank lending for funding. Efforts to enable companies to raise more funding through capital markets are being coordinated through the EU's Capital Markets Union initiative.

== Examples ==
=== Government on primary markets ===
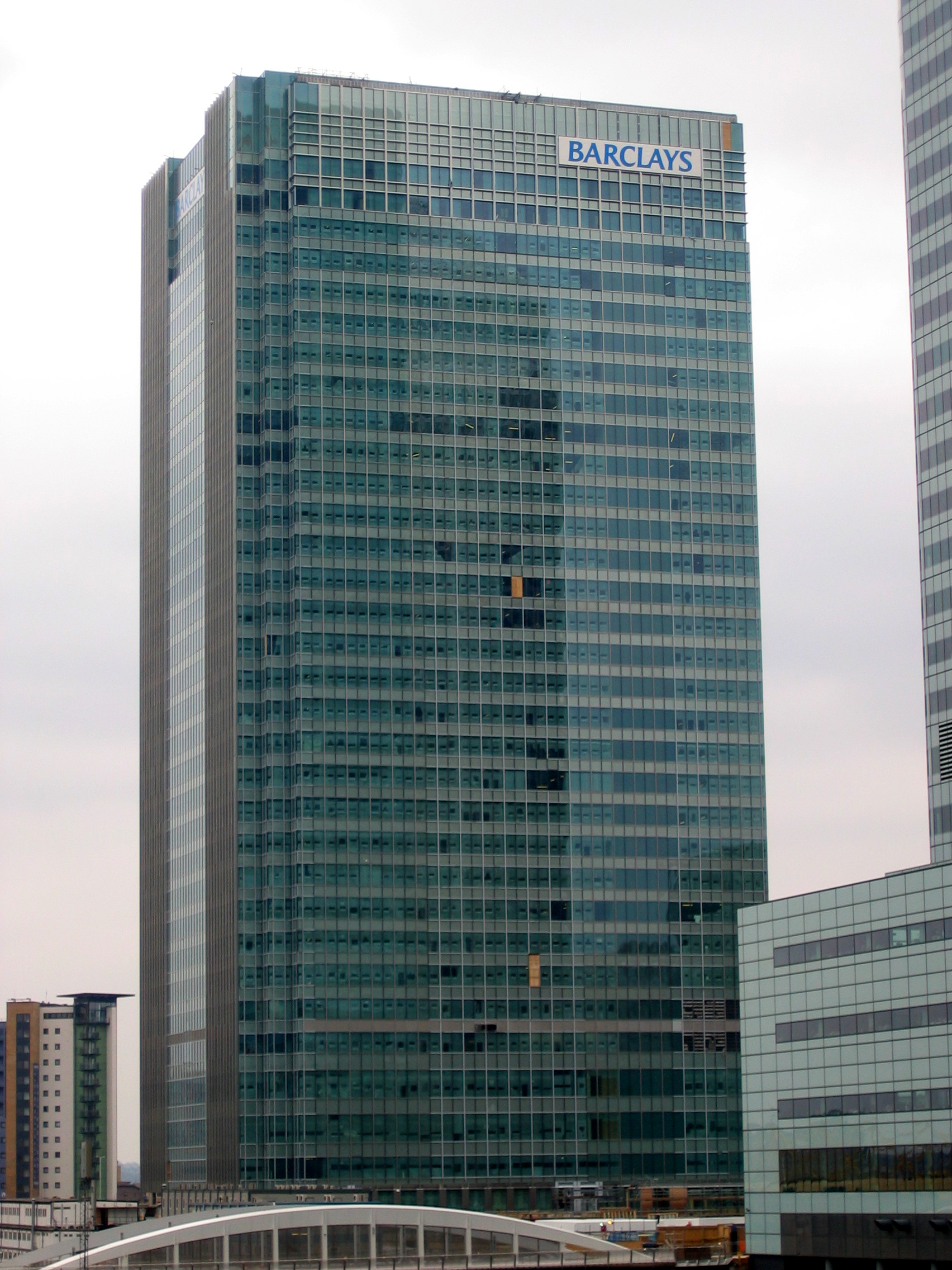
One Churchill Place, Barclays headquarters in Canary Wharf, London. Barclays is a major player in the world's primary and secondary bond markets.

When a government wants to raise long-term finance it will often sell bonds in the capital markets. In the 20th and early 21st centuries, many governments would use investment banks to organize the sale of their bonds. The leading bank would underwrite the bonds, and would often head up a syndicate of brokers, some of whom might be based in other investment banks. The syndicate would then sell to various investors. For developing countries, a multilateral development bank would sometimes provide an additional layer of underwriting, resulting in risk being shared between the investment bank(s), the multilateral organization, and the end investors. However, since 1997 it has been increasingly common for governments of the larger nations to bypass investment banks by making their bonds directly available for purchase online. Many governments now sell most of their bonds by computerized auction. Typically, large volumes are put up for sale in one go; a government may only hold a small number of auctions each year. Some governments will also sell a continuous stream of bonds through other channels. The biggest single seller of debt is the U.S. government; there are usually several transactions for such sales every second, (Note: Even if there is no activity from big players, U.S. citizens might be making small investments through channels like Treasury Direct.) which corresponds to the continuous updating of the U.S. real-time debt clock.

=== Company on primary markets ===
When a company wants to raise money for long-term investment, one of its first decisions is whether to do so by issuing bonds or shares. If it chooses shares, it avoids increasing its debt, and in some cases the new shareholders may also provide non-monetary help, such as expertise or useful contacts. On the other hand, a new issue of shares will dilute the ownership rights of the existing shareholders, and if they gain a controlling interest, the new shareholders may even replace senior managers. From an investor's point of view, shares offer the potential for higher returns and capital gains if the company does well. Conversely, bonds are safer if the company does poorly, as they are less prone to severe falls in price, and in the event of bankruptcy, bond owners may be paid something, while shareholders will receive nothing.

When a company raises finance from the primary market, the process is more likely to involve face-to-face meetings than other capital market transactions. Whether they choose to issue bonds or shares, (Note: Sometimes the company will consult with the investment bank for advice before they make this decision.) companies will typically enlist the services of an investment bank to mediate between themselves and the market. A team from the investment bank often meets with the company's senior managers to ensure their plans are sound. The bank then acts as an underwriter, and will arrange for a network of brokers to sell the bonds or shares to investors. This second stage is usually done mostly through computerized systems, though brokers will often phone up their favored clients to advise them of the opportunity. Companies can avoid paying fees to investment banks by using a direct public offering, though this is not a common practice as it incurs other legal costs and can take up considerable management time.

=== Secondary market trading ===
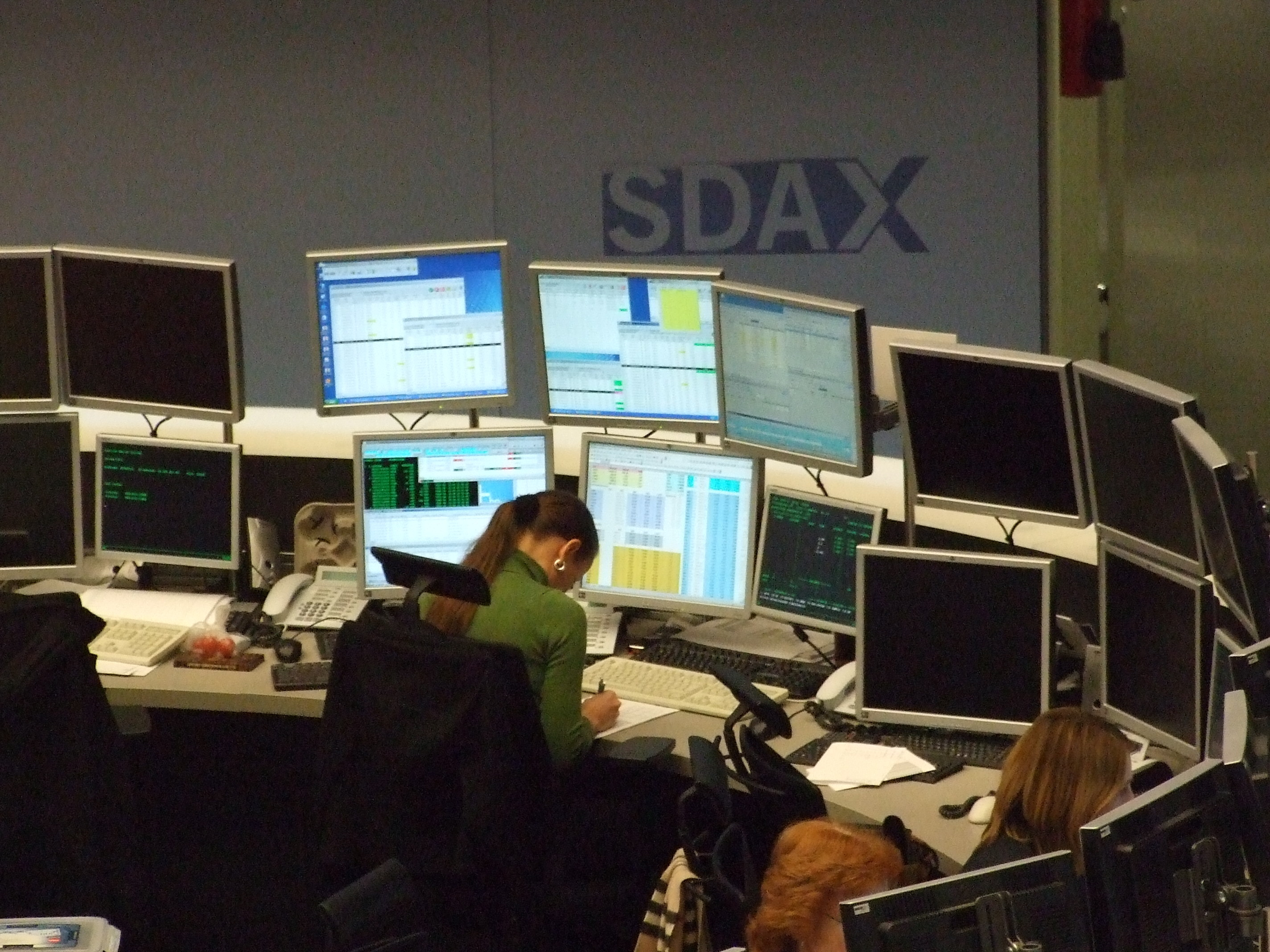
An employee at the Deutsche Börse. Most 21st century capital market transactions are executed electronically.

Most capital market transactions take place on the secondary market. On the primary market, each security can be sold only once, and the process to create batches of new shares or bonds is often lengthy due to regulatory requirements. On the secondary markets, there is no limit to the number of times a security can be traded, and the process is usually very quick. (Note: This is far more likely to occur with shares, as exchanges that allow the automated trading of bonds are not as common, and bonds are generally traded less frequently.) Transactions on the secondary market do not directly raise finance, but they do make it easier for companies and governments to raise finance on the primary market, as investors know that if they want to get their money back quickly, they will usually be easily able to re-sell their securities. Sometimes, however, secondary capital market transactions can have a negative effect on the primary borrowers: for example, if a large proportion of investors try to sell their bonds, this can push up the yields for future issues from the same entity. An extreme example occurred shortly after Bill Clinton began his first term as President of the United States; Clinton was forced to abandon some of the spending increases he had promised in his election campaign due to pressure from the bond markets. In the 21st century, several governments have tried to lock in as much as possible of their borrowing into long-dated bonds, so they are less vulnerable to pressure from the markets. Following the 2008 financial crisis, the introduction of quantitative easing further reduced the ability of private actors to push up the yields of government bonds, at least for countries with a central bank able to engage in substantial open market operations.

A variety of different players are active in the secondary markets. Individual investors account for a small proportion of trading, though their share has slightly increased; in the 20th century it was mostly only a few wealthy individuals who could afford an account with a broker, but accounts are now much cheaper and accessible over the internet. There are now numerous small traders who can buy and sell on the secondary markets using platforms provided by brokers which are accessible via web browsers. When such an individual trades on the capital markets, it will often involve a two-stage transaction. First they place an order with their broker, then the broker executes the trade. If the trade can be done on an exchange, the process will often be fully automated. If a dealer needs to manually intervene, this will often mean a larger fee. Traders in investment banks will often make deals on their bank's behalf, as well as executing trades for their clients. Investment banks will often have a division (or department) called "capital markets": staff in this division try to keep aware of the various opportunities in both the primary and secondary markets, and will advise major clients accordingly. Pension and sovereign wealth funds tend to have the largest holdings, though they tend to buy only the highest grade (safest) types of bonds and shares, and some of them do not trade all that frequently. According to a 2012 Financial Times article, hedge funds are increasingly making most of the short-term trades in large sections of the capital market (like the UK and US stock exchanges), which is making it harder for them to maintain their historically high returns, as they are increasingly finding themselves trading with each other rather than with less sophisticated investors.

There are several ways to invest in the secondary market without directly buying shares or bonds. A common method is to invest in mutual funds (Note: A mutual fund itself will sometimes purchase securities from the primary markets as well as the secondary.) or exchange-traded funds. It is also possible to buy and sell derivatives that are based on the secondary market; one of the most common type of these is contracts for difference – these can provide rapid profits, but can also cause buyers to lose more money than they originally invested.

== Size ==
All figures given are in billions of US$ and are sourced to the IMF. There is no universally recognized standard for measuring all of these figures, so other estimates may vary. A GDP column is included for comparison.

Year	Stocks	Bonds	Bank assets	Total of stocks, bonds and bank assets	World GDP
2013	62,552.00	99,788.80	120,421.60	282,762.40	74,699.30
2012	52,494.90	99,134.20	116,956.10	268,585.20	72,216.40
2011	47,089.23	98,388.10	110,378.24	255,855.57	69,899.22

=== Forecasting and analyses ===
A great deal of work goes into analyzing capital markets and predicting their future movements. This includes academic study, work within the financial industry for the purposes of making money and risk management, and work done by governments and multilateral institutions for the purposes of regulation and understanding the impact of capital markets on the wider economy. Methods range from the gut instincts of experienced traders, to various forms of stochastic calculus and algorithms such as the Stratonovich-Kalman-Bucy filtering algorithm.

== Capital controls ==
Capital controls are measures imposed by a state's government aimed at managing capital account transactions – in other words, capital market transactions where one of the counter-parties (Note: i.e., either the buyer or the seller.) involved is in a foreign country. Whereas domestic regulatory authorities try to ensure that capital market participants trade fairly with each other, and sometimes to ensure institutions like banks do not take excessive risks, capital controls aim to ensure that the macroeconomic effects of the capital markets do not have a negative impact. Most advanced nations like to use capital controls sparingly if at all, as in theory allowing markets freedom is a win-win situation for all involved: investors are free to seek maximum returns, and countries can benefit from investments that will develop their industry and infrastructure. However, sometimes capital market transactions can have a net negative effect: for example, in a financial crisis, there can be a mass withdrawal of capital, leaving a nation without sufficient foreign-exchange reserves to pay for needed imports. On the other hand, if too much capital is flowing into a country, it can increase inflation and the value of the nation's currency, making its exports uncompetitive. Countries like India employ capital controls to ensure that their citizens' money is invested at home rather than abroad.

== See also ==
- Bank
- Center for Audit Quality (CAQ)
- Committee on Capital Markets Regulation (United States)
- Credit union
- Financial market
- Financial regulation
- Stock exchange
- Capital Markets Union
