= Richard Gregg =

Richard Gregg may refer to:

- Richard Gregg (social philosopher) (1885–1974), American social philosopher and pacifist
- Richard Gregg (field hockey) (1883–1945), Irish Olympic field hockey player
- Richard L. Gregg, U.S. Fiscal Assistant Secretary of the Treasury
