= Cetesdirecto =

Mexican government program

Cetesdirecto is a Mexican government program established on November 26, 2010 after an effort to promote and extend savings and investment in the country. This program allows small and medium investors to have access to financial services and to invest on government securities with accessible amounts and without commissions.

With the establishment of cetesdirecto, government securities are seen as an alternative of saving and investment allowing people to buy and sell these instruments issued regularly by the Federal Government, from 100 pesos and thus have access to competitive interest rates in the money market.

== Background ==
The Mexican financial system is looking for an expansion of financial inclusion but still there is a gap between the demand and supply of financial services. The Federal Government developed a strategy which creates new distribution channels of financial services in order to meet the demand that has no access yet, and also a complementary agenda in order to improve the financial education in the country.

The traditional method for issuing government debt is through auctions that only big investors can access. Retail debt gives small investors the opportunity to buy government securities without intermediaries. This scheme is already used by countries such as the United States (TreasuryDirect), Brazil (Tesouro Direto), Spain (Tesoro Público) and others.

The most popular distribution channel for this type of issuing is the internet, although some countries use non electronic media such as mail. Some others use telephone. Canada and the United States use payroll discount as a channel.

Before cetesdirecto, the only way in which a medium or small investor in Mexico could buy government securities was through a credit institution or private stockbroker. Today, any investor can do it using a computer or the call center.

cetesdirecto was implemented according to the National Development Plan (PND) and the National Development Financing Program (PRONAFIDE), focused to bring more depth, competitiveness and efficiency to the financial system. This program is part of the public debt strategy on the Annual Borrowing Plans 2009 and 2010 oriented to extend the investors base and to expand the financial culture among the population promoted by the Secretariat of Finance and Public Credit (SHCP)

== Characteristics ==
cetesdirecto allows investors to:

- Buy government securities
- Sell government securities
- Manage their accounts through the website or the call center
- Reinvest interest and capital

The government securities offered by cetesdirecto are those available weekly on the auctions made by the Federal Government through the Mexican Central Bank, such as Mexican Federal Treasury Certificates (Cetes), Development Bonds denominated in investment units (Udibonos), Development Bonds with a Fixed Interest Rate (Bonos M) and Development Bonds (Bondes D). As a result of cetesdirecto, government securities are seen as an alternative of saving and investment because now individuals are able to have access to competitive interest rates in the money market without brokers and commissions, and to have an investment portfolio according to their necessities.
