= TreasuryDirect =

US government website

Agency overview
- Formed: 1986; 40 years ago
- Type: United States Treasury security seller
- Parent department: Bureau of the Fiscal Service
- Website
- Available in: English
- Website: www.treasurydirect.gov
- Commercial: No
- Launched: 2002

TreasuryDirect is a website run by the Bureau of the Fiscal Service under the United States Department of the Treasury that allows US individual investors to purchase treasury securities, such as savings bonds, directly from the US government. It enables people to manage their investments online, including connecting their TreasuryDirect account to a bank account for deposits and withdrawals.

TreasuryDirect started in 1986 as a book entry system with business conducted over postal mail, as an alternative to purchasing securities as engraved paper certificates. The current online system launched in 2002. A replacement system known as TRIM has been in progress since 2013, but after a decade of development, the project is at risk with higher than planned costs.

== Products and services ==
A TreasuryDirect account enables purchasing treasury securities: Treasury bills, Treasury notes, Treasury bonds, Inflation-Protected Securities (TIPS), floating rate notes (FRNs), and Series I and EE Savings Bonds in electronic form. TreasuryDirect charges no fees for opening an account, purchasing bonds, redeeming bonds, or maintaining an account. TreasuryDirect permits reinvestment at maturity for Treasury bills, notes, bonds and floating rate notes, but not Treasury Inflation-Protected Securities (TIPS).

The website allows money to be deposited from and withdrawn to personal bank accounts. A TreasuryDirect account holder can direct the Treasury to deposit all or part of their income tax refund into their account using IRS Form 8888. A person can also instruct their employer to direct deposit an amount from each paycheck into their TreasuryDirect account, which replaced an earlier system where an employee could instruct their company to purchase paper bonds with a portion of their paycheck.

TreasuryDirect offers a way for people to convert their paper savings bonds into book entry form (managed within the electronic system), which reduces the risk of losing paper bonds and allows redeeming bonds online.

Another component was "Treasury Hunt", a tool to help the public find and cash in their mature savings bonds and other interest payments owed to them. As of 2019, the public held $26 billion of savings bonds that are no longer earning interest. Treasury Hunt has not been available since September 30, 2025; TreasuryDirect directs people who believe they have a lost, stolen, or destroyed savings bond to its claim forms instead.

TreasuryDirect includes information and research tools to help individual investors purchase and manage Treasury securities. The TreasuryDirect system can be accessed via the URL wizard.gov, which formerly led to its Savings Bond Wizard tool (replaced by a Savings Bond Calculator).

== Account management ==
Personal finance columnists have described the website as frustrating, finicky, clunky, and outdated. After logging in, a user cannot use their web browser "back" button during their session, since that can log them out.

Account registration with TreasuryDirect includes an identity verification step, and the system requires some people to complete an additional paper identity verification form and get it notarized. Previously, TreasuryDirect sometimes required bringing the form to a bank or credit union for a signature guarantee. That process could be complicated and take weeks, and US Representative Abigail Spanberger wrote a letter of concern about this to the Department of the Treasury. The account process can be especially difficult for people less familiar with electronic systems.

TreasuryDirect login screen, showing virtual keyboard

As of May 2023, the TreasuryDirect login screen allows normal entry of a password. Previously, the login screen required the user to enter their password using a virtual keyboard, which prevented copying-and-pasting a password or automatically entering a password using some password managers. This virtual keyboard made using a strong password more difficult, and people made unofficial bookmarklets and browser extensions to enable pasting a password.

As of December 2022, the TreasuryDirect website allows people to connect their account to a new bank account online. Previously, if a person needed to correct their bank account or add a different one, they needed to complete the paper signature guarantee process.

Related to increased demand in 2022, the TreasuryDirect customer support phone number sometimes had wait times longer than two hours. TreasuryDirect says that customer requests sent by mail can take up to 13 weeks to process. This can cause issues for people who need assistance with selecting and filling out the correct forms to take actions on their investments.

The terms and conditions for securities purchased through TreasuryDirect are in the Code of Federal Regulations in the form of an FAQ, including details about account management.

== System history ==
Before establishing TreasuryDirect, Treasury staff sold securities in paper certificate form to individual investors from windows in the lobbies of their office in Washington, D.C. and some Federal Reserve Banks.

=== 1980s: Postal mail ===
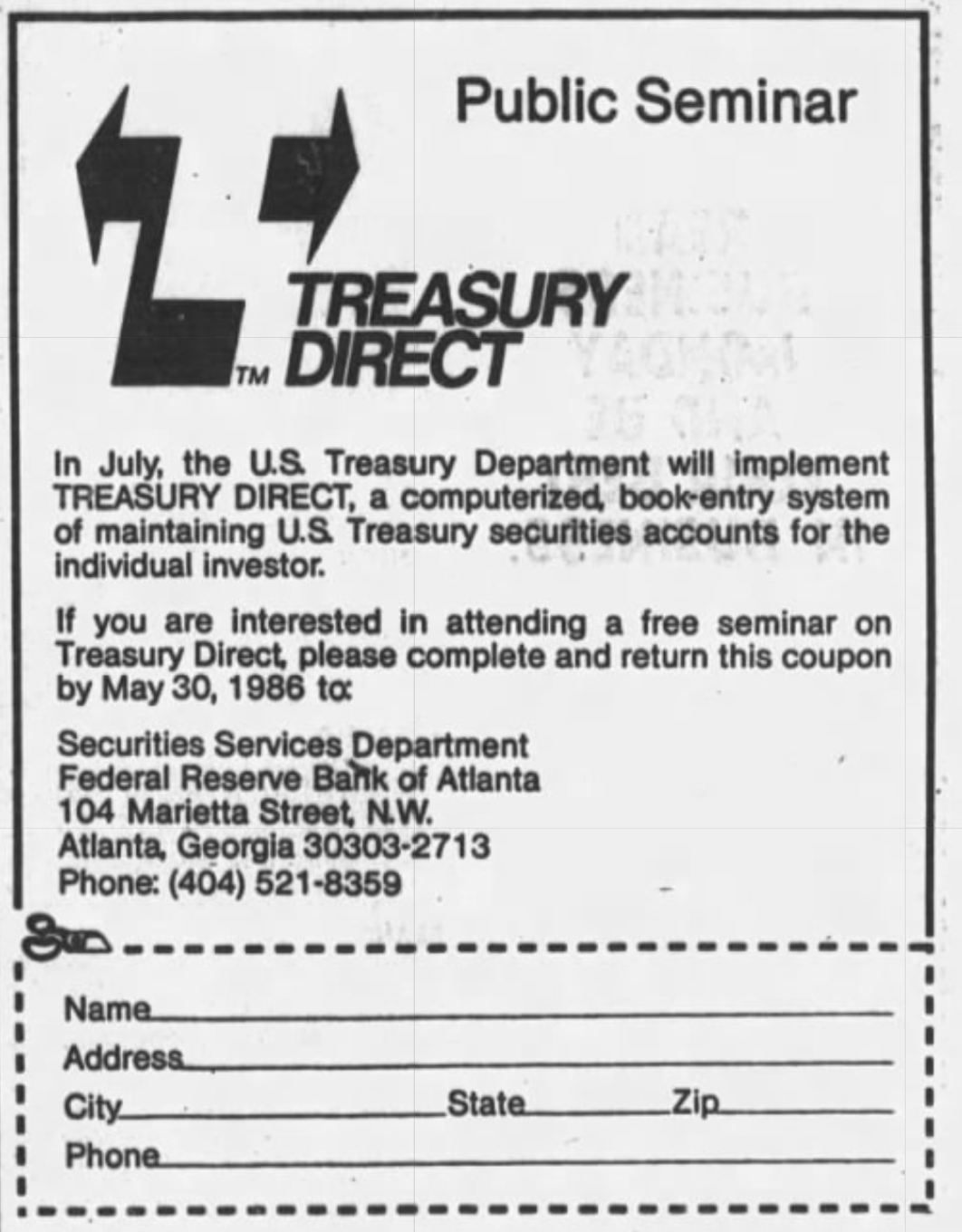
Advertisement to the public in May 1986

The TreasuryDirect service originated in 1986 as a computerized service conducted over postal mail. Instead of issuing traditional engraved certificates, it sold notes, bonds, and bills in a computerized book-entry system; Treasury estimated that this shift would save $46 million.

=== 1990s: Telephone and website ===
TreasuryDirect had 900,000 participants in 1996, which dropped in 1997 to 825,000 participants. In 1997, the system, described as "suffering from pre-electronic age procedures", was updated to modernize it and encourage more people to participate. The changes included enabling debits from a bank account (instead of paying by check), ordering reinvestments over a toll-free telephone number, and selling securities by mail.

By 1998, the Treasury website hosted forms that a person could print out and mail to establish a TreasuryDirect account. In 1999, Treasury started a separate service called Savings Bond Direct that allowed buying paper savings bonds online with a credit card and without establishing an account.

=== 2000s: Online sales ===
The TreasuryDirect website started selling electronic Series I bonds online in October 2002, and it added Series EE bonds in May 2003. This system was designed to support up to 80 million user accounts; by March 2004, it had 168,000 accounts. Concurrent with the new system, credit card sales of savings bonds was terminated on December 31, 2003.

The online TreasuryDirect service was part of Treasury's plan to stop selling paper savings bonds. At the time, a Treasury official said that the cost of running the paper savings bond program was relatively high, making it ''not an efficient means of financing for the federal government".

Treasury continued to offer book-entry sales via postal mail and telephone orders, calling that system Legacy TreasuryDirect to distinguish it from online TreasuryDirect accounts.

In 2006, TreasuryDirect added a "virtual keyboard" to its login system for entering a password.

From 2007 to 2011, the login system also required entering a random code from a card mailed to the user, which a Treasury spokesperson described as "somewhat of a stickler for us in terms of customer satisfaction." This access card provided a form of multi-factor authentication, and TreasuryDirect replaced it with the more standard method of sending a one-time password to the user's email address.

=== 2010s: Online-only services ===
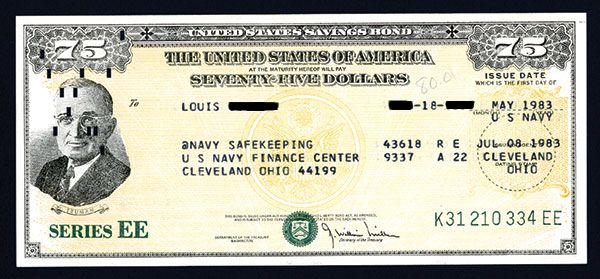
Discontinued paper Series EE savings bond from 1983, with serial number in punched card format

Treasury stopped selling paper Series EE and I savings bonds on December 31, 2011, requiring people to use the TreasuryDirect website to purchase them, except for paper Series I bonds purchased using a tax return. Paper savings bonds were previously a common gift that family members bought for children from a local bank or credit union, but people found giving bonds in electronic form to be more complicated.

However, the switch to electronic bonds did not significantly impact overall bond sales, as reported by the Government Accountability Office in 2015: "the decline in savings bond purchases after Treasury discontinued the sale of paper savings bonds in January 2012 was consistent with the overall long-term decline in savings bond purchases". Savings bond purchasers tend to purchase fewer bonds when interest rates are lower, and interest rates had been declining over the past several years. For example, in May 2015, new Series EE bonds earned 0.3 percent interest, and new Series I bonds earned zero percent interest at that time.

In 2011, Treasury began phasing out Legacy TreasuryDirect, encouraging account holders to transition to the online system. Treasury decommissioned the legacy service in 2014, but continues to allow remaining account holders to hold securities to maturity or transfer securities to another account.

==== Plans for replacement of TreasuryDirect ====
In 2014, Treasury published a request for comments to inform their work on Treasury Retail Investment Manager (TRIM), a future replacement for TreasuryDirect that would be "more flexible and responsive to changing business needs for delivering digital investing needs." Treasury published sources sought notices in 2015 for architectural design and fraud prevention for TRIM. As of May 2015, Treasury was working on defining technical requirements and intending to "develop an implementation plan for TRIM by April 2016", part of a four-phase development plan: initiation, planning, execution, and closing. In 2019, Treasury said that TRIM would support both laptops and mobile phones, and that it would "allow the unbanked and the under-banked to electronically purchase investments by providing alternative payment mechanisms, unlike TreasuryDirect which requires bank accounts."

=== 2020s ===
During the 2021–2022 inflation surge, a number of financial planners pointed out the potential benefits of using TreasuryDirect to purchase Series I Bonds during periods of high inflation, because their return is adjusted to match inflation. The annual interest rate for I Bonds was 9.62% in April 2022, the highest inflation rate since this type of bond was introduced in 1998. People opened 1.85 million new savings bond accounts between November 2021 and the end of June 2022. In May 2022, the TreasuryDirect website crashed at least once related to increased demand.

TreasuryDirect is part of the Treasury Retail Securities Services program, and a 2022 Treasury budget document said "In FY 2020, Retail began development work to replace its aging TreasuryDirect (TD) application ... With the deployment of TRIM, Retail will also roll out a new type of savings security for the public." A Treasury spokesperson also said in March 2022 that they were working on a replacement system.

In October 2022, TreasuryDirect updated its public informational website to make it easier to navigate and understand for investors looking for answers about bonds and other Treasury products. At that time, Treasury said they had sold $27 billion in I Bonds since increasing the interest rate in November 2021, compared to $364 million in 2020. Near the end of October 2022, in the last few days that TreasuryDirect offered the 9.62% rate, the website saw a surge of new customers and was slow or unavailable to access for some people who had wanted to buy I Bonds. Treasury said it could not guarantee that all orders would be completed in time to receive the 9.62% rate, and that the volume of purchases was causing "significant pressure and strain on the 20-year-old TreasuryDirect application".

Nearly a decade after the initial request for comments, Treasury officials stated in March 2022 that TRIM/MyTreasury remains "a priority." In June 2023, it was announced that there is a high risk to the TRIM/MyTreasury project due to ongoing challenges related to delivery of core functionality, coding, defects, testing, and environments. At the same time, an independent verification and validation was undertaken to assess opportunities to improve processes and controls. A May 2025 project update indicated that in addition to continuing to be at risk, projected costs were higher than planned.

== Similar programs ==
The National Treasury of Brazil has an online service called Tesouro Direto (Treasury Direct) that sells public bonds to individuals in Brazil, established in 2002.

The federal government of Mexico established cetesdirecto (Treasury Certificates Direct) in 2010 to enable small and medium investors to purchase government securities online, by phone, and at customer service windows.

The Bank of Spain offers a Cuentas Directas (direct accounts) service to residents of Spain who want to purchase newly-issued Spanish Treasury securities.

== See also ==
- Treasury Enterprise Architecture Framework
