= JFMIP =

The Joint Financial Management Improvement Program (JFMIP) is a joint and cooperative action undertaken by the U.S. Department of the Treasury, Government Accountability Office (GAO), the Office of Management and Budget (OMB), and the Office of Personnel Management (OPM). The goal of the JFMIP is to improve financial management practices in the federal government.

== See also ==
Offices

- Comptroller and Auditor General
- Comptroller
- Inspector General
- Treasurer
- Government Accountability Project
- Project On Government Oversight
