= Title 31 of the Code of Federal Regulations =

U.S. federal rules and regulations on money, finance, and the treasury

CFR Title 31 - Money and Finance: Treasury is one of fifty titles comprising the United States Code of Federal Regulations (CFR). Title 31 is the principal set of rules and regulations issued by federal agencies of the United States regarding money, finance, and the treasury. It is available in digital and printed form, and can be referenced online using the Electronic Code of Federal Regulations (e-CFR).

== Structure ==
The table of contents, as reflected in the e-CFR updated March 6, 2014, is as follows:

Volume	Chapter	Parts	Regulatory Entity
1		0-50	Subtitle A--Office of the Secretary of the Treasury
	I	51-199	Recovery Accountability and Transparency Board
2	II	200-399	Fiscal Service, Department of the Treasury
	IV	400-499	Secret Service, Department of the Treasury
3	V	500-599	Office of Foreign Assets Control, Department of the Treasury
	VI	600-699	Bureau of Engraving and Printing, Department of the Treasury
	VII	700-799	Federal Law Enforcement Training Center, Department of the Treasury
	VIII	800-899	Office of Investment Security, Department of the Treasury
	IX	900-999	Federal Claims Collection Standards (Department of the Treasury—Department of Justice)
	X	1000-1099	Financial Crimes Enforcement Network, Department of the Treasury
