= Financial Management Service =

- Seal

- Logo

Agency overview
- Formed: 1974
- Preceding agency: Bureau of Accounts
- Dissolved: October 7, 2012
- Superseding agency: Bureau of the Fiscal Service
- Headquarters: Washington, D.C.
- Employees: 2,100
- Agency executives: David A. Lebryk, Commissioner; Wanda Rogers, Deputy Commissioner
- Parent agency: Treasury Department
- Website: www.fms.treas.gov

The Financial Management Service (FMS) was a bureau of the United States Department of the Treasury and provided several financial services for the federal government. On October 7, 2012, Secretary of the Treasury Timothy Geithner issued a directive merging the FMS with the Bureau of the Public Debt to form the new Bureau of the Fiscal Service.

== Services ==
These services included centralized payment, collection, and reporting services, oversight of a daily cash flow of nearly $58 billion into and out of federal accounts, disbursement of more than $1.5 trillion to more than 100 million individuals via Social Security and veterans' benefits, issuance of tax refunds and other federal payments, collection of more than $2.67 trillion per year in payments to the government through financial institutions, and collection of delinquent debts owed to the government.

FMS had a total of 2,100 employees located in its headquarters offices in Washington, D.C., and Hyattsville, Maryland, and its five regional centers in Austin, Birmingham, Kansas City, Philadelphia, and San Francisco. Before 1984, FMS was known as the Bureau of Government Financial Operations.

=== Credit Gateway ===
On September 13, 2010, the Financial Management Service started to use Credit Gateway as a deposit program for the receipt of federal agency Fedwire and ACH credit transactions. It is an effort to modernize the collections and cash management programs of the US Department of the Treasury and is being implemented in multiple phases over the course of two years.

The Credit Gateway is operated by a commercial bank that has been designated as a financial agent of the government. The bank processes FMS transactions using its own infrastructure and commercial software. The transactions settle at Federal Reserve Banks, rather than at the designated commercial bank. The Credit Gateway processes transactions in real time to FMS reporting systems, namely the Transaction Reporting System.
