= Bureau of the Fiscal Service =

United States federal agency

- Logo of the Bureau of the Fiscal Service

Agency overview
- Formed: October 7, 2012
- Preceding agencies: Bureau of the Public Debt; Financial Management Service
- Jurisdiction: United States federal government
- Headquarters: Parkersburg, WV; 39.2667418°N 81.5615135°W
- Employees: 1,969 FTE _{(2020)}
- Annual budget: $857,202,000 _{(2020)}
- Agency executive: Timothy Gribben, Commissioner of the Fiscal Service
- Parent department: United States Department of the Treasury
- Website: www.fiscal.treasury.gov

The Bureau of the Fiscal Service (Fiscal Service) is part of the U.S. Department of the Treasury. The Bureau consolidates the activities of the previous Bureau of the Public Debt and the Financial Management Service, under the Office of Fiscal Service. It manages the government's accounting, central payment systems, and public debt; it serves essentially as the United States Government's checking account and the payment rail for every federal agency. The Bureau acts as the federal government's agent as it interfaces with the various agencies. It also operates the TreasuryDirect website for purchasing Treasury securities.

The Bureau also manages the daily auctions of Treasury Securities, which provide the cash necessary to fund all activities of the United States Government.

== History ==
The Fiscal Service's roots begin under the Roosevelt administration, beginning in 1939 as a consolidation of all Treasury financing activities into a "Fiscal Service." The Bureau's activities "included accounts, deposits, bookkeeping, warrants, loans, currency, disbursements, surety bonds, savings bonds, and the public debt," consolidating management under a fiscal assistant secretary. By 1974, the agency lost authority over the Public Debt, and was renamed to the Bureau of Government Financial Operations. In 1984, the agency was renamed again to the Financial Management Service.

The Fiscal Service replaced the Bureau of the Public Debt and the Financial Management Service effective October 7, 2012, by directive of Treasury Secretary Timothy Geithner. The merger of the two agencies and their data centers saved $415 million. The agency manages the federal government's current and delinquent debt of consumer and commercial accounts and reports the information to credit rating firms.

As of 2017, the bureau may collect any voluntary donations made to the government for reduction of the public debt. Annual donations averaged $2.3 million during the last 26 years prior to 2021. In comparison, the public debt was over $40 trillion as of 2026. The agency also plays a critical role in managing Extraordinary measures during United States debt ceiling crises, such as the 2023 United States debt-ceiling crisis.

On January 20, 2025, the second Trump administration established the Department of Government Efficiency (DOGE), a temporary organization with Elon Musk as its administrator, and renamed the United States Digital Service to the United States DOGE Service to function as a parent agency. On January 31, the DOGE team gained access to the U.S. Treasury payment system, administered by the Bureau of the Fiscal Service, after the career Assistant Secretary in charge of maintaining the payment system suddenly resigned. This gave DOGE "full access" to the Fiscal Service's database controlling the expenditure of 6 trillion dollars, as well as "the sensitive personal data of millions of Americans as well as details of public contractors who compete directly with Musk’s own businesses." This read and write access could allow Musk to block payments by the U.S. government to many federal programs. Senator Ron Wyden stated that this access was a "national security risk."

== Publications ==
The Fiscal Service publishes data on the Federal Government's "accounting, central payment systems, and public debt" on fiscaldata.treasury.gov. As of February 9th, 2025, there are a total of 52 datasets available to download, including data on the amount of and holders of federal debt, data on the daily cash balance of the U.S. Treasury, detailed data on the settled offers of each day's Treasury Auction, U.S. government revenue and cash inflows by department, the position of state unemployment insurance funds, and details on state and local government security auctions.

The Fiscal Service uses the data assembled to publish the yearly Financial Report of the United States Government, which lays out the federal government's financial position after the end of the fiscal year in accordance with Generally Accepted Accounting Principles (United States). The Fiscal Service also maintains the website usaspending.gov/, a repository of every awarded and dispersed federal grant.

== Disbursements ==
The Fiscal Service manages most disbursements and collections for the federal government. The Fiscal Service disburses 87.9% of federal payments, at an amount of $5.6 trillion, and processed $5.4 trillion in federal revenue for the 2023 fiscal year. The agency manages all collections paid to the Internal Revenue Service, contributing to the large number of collections. The United States Department of Defense does not manage payments through the Fiscal Service, by far the most notable agency to manage its own payments. Social Security, Medicare, and Medicaid grants are paid through the Fiscal Service.

== See also ==
- Title 31 of the Code of Federal Regulations
- Office of Fiscal Service
- Bureau of the Public Debt
- Financial Management Service
- National debt of the United States
