= Bureau of the Public Debt =

Former United States government agency

Agency overview
- Formed: 1940
- Preceding agency: Public Debt Service
- Dissolved: October 7, 2012
- Superseding agency: Bureau of the Fiscal Service
- Jurisdiction: U.S. Federal Government
- Headquarters: Washington, D.C.
- Employees: 1,950 (2009)
- Agency executive: Van Zeck, Commissioner of the Public Debt
- Parent agency: Department of the Treasury
- Website: www.treasurydirect.gov www.publicdebt.treas.gov

The Bureau of the Public Debt was an agency within the Fiscal Service of the Department of the Treasury that managed the public debt of the United States. It was consolidated with the Financial Management Service to form the Bureau of the Fiscal Service in 2012.

Under authority derived from Article I, section 8 of the Constitution, the Bureau of Public Debt was responsible for borrowing the money needed to operate the federal government, and was where donations to reduce the debt were made. It also accounted for the resulting debt and more recently, provided administrative and IT services to federal agencies. Principal operations were conducted in Washington, D.C. and Parkersburg, West Virginia. It relied on Federal Reserve Banks, acting as Treasury's fiscal agents, to operate critical systems in support of the bureau's programs and to perform a variety of processing and customer service functions in marketable and savings securities.

The Bureau also provided reimbursable administrative and information technology services to other government agencies through the Administrative Resource Center (ARC). The bureau operated five different programs: Wholesale Securities Services, Government Agency Investment Services, Retail Securities Services, Summary Debt Accounting, and Franchise Services.

== History ==
While the public debt of the United States can be traced to the beginning of the nation itself in 1776, the Bureau of the Public Debt was created in 1940. The United States government creates financial budgets through three methods: by printing money, collecting taxes, and by borrowing. The printing of money is costly and causes inflation, and taxation reduces the income of the taxpayer, so borrowing is necessary to finance deficits with the expectation of repayment in times of surplus. A related process, the issuance of insurance and securities, was performed by the Bureau through the open market. The creation was part of a Treasury reorganization plan where the Public Debt Service was officially designated the Bureau of the Public Debt. Public Debt began its presence in Parkersburg in 1954, when the city was designated a relocation site for Public Debt in the event of a national emergency. In 1957, Parkersburg became the electronic processing center for savings bonds, and from 1993 to 1996, Public Debt consolidated and transferred the majority of its operations to Parkersburg. In 2012, when the Bureau consolidated with the Financial Management Service to form the Bureau of the Fiscal Service, more than 95% of its employees worked in Parkersburg.

== Organizational structure ==
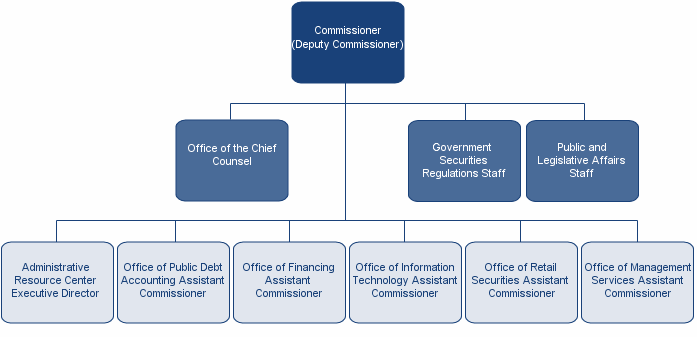

== Programs ==
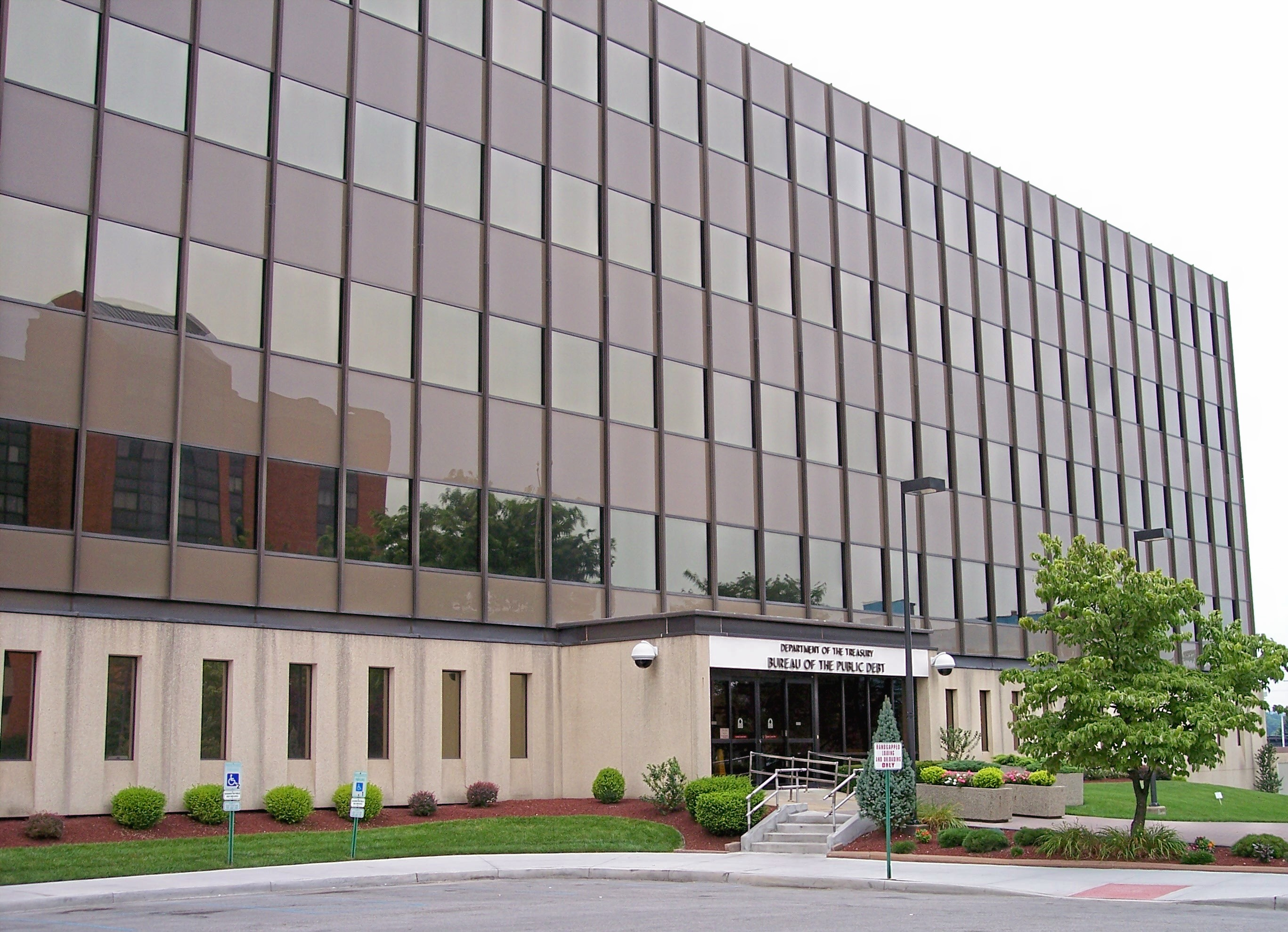
One of Public Debt's several buildings in downtown Parkersburg.

=== Wholesale Securities Services ===
The Wholesale Securities Services program ensures the government's critical financing needs are met and administers Treasury's auction rules and government securities market regulations. Wholesale Securities Services is responsible for the sale and issuance of trillions of dollars in securities each year, and the operation of Treasury and Federal Reserve systems that support the issuance and redemption of Treasury securities.

Another responsibility of the program is identifying which securities can be pledged to the government for collateral and determining how these securities are valued. This process ensures that both government funds on deposit at commercial banks and private-sector contracts with the government are secured.

The Wholesale Securities Services program contributes to Treasury's priority of financing the debt at the lowest cost over time by guaranteeing operational readiness to meet the government's financing needs and protecting and strengthening Treasury's borrowing capabilities. It also educates and builds relationships with large investors and preserves confidence in Treasury auctions through the auction rule compliance program.

=== Government Agency Investment Services ===
The Government Agency Investment Services program is made up of three components: Federal Investments, Special Purpose Securities, and Federal Borrowings. The program offers specialized investments for government entities at the federal, state, and local levels.

- The Federal Investments area issues, services, and redeems Government Account Series securities for federal agencies. The Federal Investments component handles the accounting and reporting on all receipts and disbursements for the 18 trust funds (such as Inland Waterways Trust Fund, Highway Trust Fund and Unemployment Fund) managed by the Treasury Department.
- The Special Purpose Securities area issues, services and redeems special purpose securities, as well as serves as a fiscal agent for securities issued by other federal agencies. The State and Local Government Series (SLGS) is the largest of these securities. SLGS offer flexible investment alternatives for state and local governments to refinance outstanding, tax-exempt debt.
- The Federal Borrowings area manages direct loans and loan guarantees to federal agencies operating loan programs. These loan programs support education, housing, veterans and small businesses. The Federal Borrowings area is also responsible for the accounting and reporting of all principal and interest amounts.

=== Retail Securities Services ===
The Retail Securities Services program serves millions of Treasury securities investors. Specifically, the program is responsible for the issuance, servicing and redemption of U.S. Savings Bonds and marketable Treasury securities. Additionally, the TreasuryDirect and Legacy Treasury Direct holding systems fall under the Retail Securities Services program. Legacy Treasury Direct and TreasuryDirect systems allow individuals and institutions set up accounts to purchase Treasury securities and hold them directly with Treasury, rather than with a financial institution.

=== Summary Debt Accounting ===
The Summary Debt Accounting program is responsible for accounting for the public debt of the United States and related interest expenses. The program controls and reconciles Treasury securities transactions and related cash flows. These cash flows represent funds received from the sale of securities and funds disbursed as interest and principal payments. Summary Debt Accounting also produces and publishes data and reports on the composition of the public debt as well as the balance of the debt to the penny. The program is focused on improving the clarity, usefulness and availability of federal debt information.

=== Franchise Services ===
Public Debt's Administrative Resource Center (ARC) provides reimbursable financial, administrative and IT services to a wide variety of federal agencies. Administrative services include financial accounting, travel and relocation services, human resources, procurement, and investment services. Information technology services include application development and hosting, website development, Internet services, network maintenance, security consulting, and encryption services.

ARC was selected by the Office of Management and Budget as a Shared Service Provider for Financial Management as well as Public Key Infrastructure (PKI) services, and as a Shared Service Center to perform Certification & Accreditation (C&A) through the Information Systems Security Line of Business (ISSLOB). ARC allows customers to focus on their missions, not support functions; lowers customer administrative service costs; improves data quality through standardization; and strengthens controls and ensures audit compliance.

=== Do Not Pay Business Center ===
As of June 18, 2010, the Bureau of Public Debt assists other government agencies in the reduction and prevention of improper payments by federally funded programs being issued. With the establishment of a single point of entry for these government funded paying agencies, determining eligibility for a grant, benefit, or contract award can be done. As a result of this streamlining improper payments will no longer occur or be avoided completely. Funds will not go to the wrong recipient or be used by a recipient in an improper manner, recipients will not receive the incorrect amount of funds (including overpayments and underpayments), and documentation will be available to support a payment that should occur and will not be available to payments that should not occur.

== Program data ==
As of August 31, 2009:

Wholesale Securities Services:

- 274 auctions
- $24.1 trillion bid
- $8.3 trillion awarded
- $6.9 trillion in marketable issues held in National Book-Entry System
- $900 billion in Treasury securities transfers daily

Retail Securities Services:

- $188.5 billion in paper savings bonds held by 50 million investors
- $54.9 billion in book-entry marketable issues held in a legacy system by 278,000 customers
- $8.7 billion in electronic savings and marketable issues held by 292,000 investors in Internet accessed TreasuryDirect system

Government Agency Investment Services:

- $4.4 trillion invested by 74 federal agencies
  - $2.9 trillion in 18 managed trust funds (Social Security, Highway, etc.)
  - $1.5 trillion in 228 other federal government trust and investment accounts
- $218 billion invested by over 6,000 state and local governments
- $789 billion loaned to 37 federal agencies

Summary Debt Accounting:

- $11.8 trillion outstanding
  - $7.5 trillion held by the public
  - $4.3 trillion held by government accounts
- $98 trillion flow of funds

Franchise Services:

- 71 agency customers (including Public Debt)
- $161 million in revenue (est.)
