= United States Department of the Treasury =

Federal executive department

- Seal of the Department

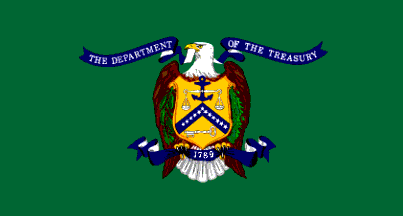
- Flag of the Department

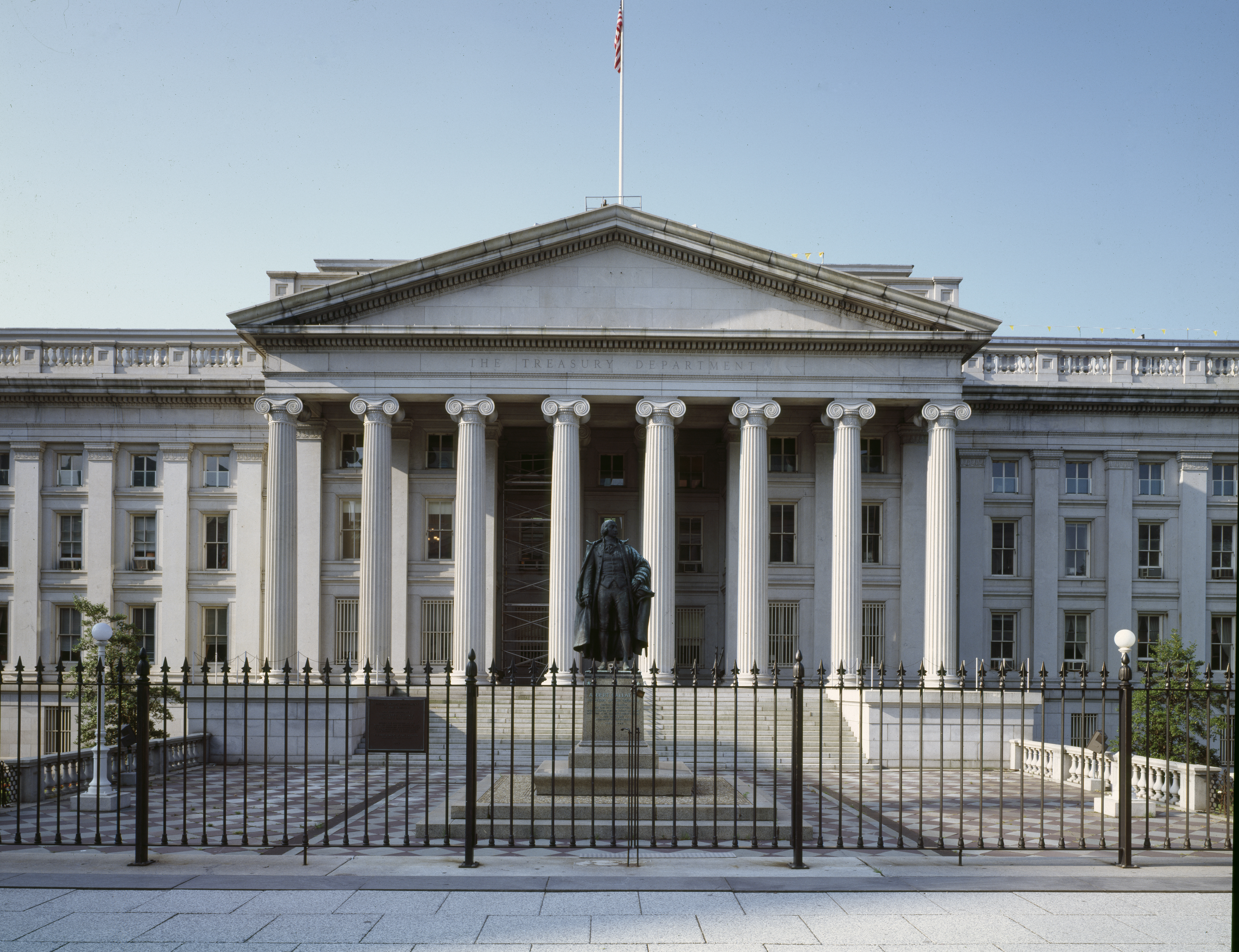
- Treasury Building

Agency overview
- Formed: September 2, 1789; 237 years ago
- Preceding agency: Board of Treasury
- Type: Executive department
- Jurisdiction: U.S. federal government
- Headquarters: Treasury Building 1500 Pennsylvania Avenue, NW Washington, D.C., U.S; 38°53′51″N 77°02′04″W
- Employees: Approx. 90,000 (2026)
- Annual budget: $3.8 Trillion
- Agency executives: Scott Bessent, Secretary; Francis Brooke, Deputy Secretary; Brandon Beach, Treasurer
- Child agencies: Internal Revenue Service; United States Mint; Bureau of Engraving and Printing; Several others
- Website: treasury.gov

The Department of the Treasury (USDT) is the national treasury and finance department of the federal government of the United States. It is one of 15 current U.S. government departments. The treasury executes currency circulation in the domestic fiscal system, collects all federal taxes through the Internal Revenue Service, manages U.S. government debt, licenses and supervises banks and thrift institutions, and advises the legislative and executive branches on fiscal policy.

The department is administered by the secretary of the treasury, who is a member of the Cabinet. The department oversees the Bureau of Engraving and Printing and the U.S. Mint, two federal agencies responsible for printing all paper currency and minting coins respectively. The treasurer of the United States has limited statutory duties, but advises the Secretary on various matters such as coinage and currency production. Both the treasurer and treasury secretary's signatures appear on all U.S. dollar bank notes.

The department was established by an act of Congress in 1789 to manage government revenue. The first secretary of the treasury was Alexander Hamilton from New York, a Founding Father. Appointed by George Washington, the nation's first president, Hamilton was sworn into office on September 11, 1789. Hamilton established the nation's early financial system and for several years was a major presence in Washington's administration. The department is customarily referred to as "Treasury", solely, without any preceding article – a transitional remnant from British to American English.

== History ==
=== American Revolution ===
The history of the Department of the Treasury began during the American Revolution when the Continental Congress, convening in Philadelphia, deliberated the crucial question of how it would finance the American Revolutionary War in which the Thirteen Colonies ultimately sought independence from the Kingdom of Great Britain, then led by King George III.

The Congress had no power to levy and collect taxes, nor was there a tangible basis for securing funds from foreign investors or governments. The delegates resolved to issue paper money in the form of bills of credit, promising redemption in coin on faith in the revolutionary cause. On June 22, 1775, only a few days after the Battle of Bunker Hill, the Continental Congress issued $2 million in bills; on July 25, 28 citizens of Philadelphia were employed by Congress to sign and number the currency.

On July 29, 1775, the Second Continental Congress assigned responsibility for the administration of the revolutionary government's finances to joint Continental treasurers George Clymer and Michael Hillegas. Congress stipulated that each of the colonies contribute to the Continental government's funds. To ensure proper and efficient handling of the growing national debt in the face of weak economic and political ties between the colonies, the Congress, on February 17, 1776, designated a committee of five to superintend the treasury, settle accounts, and report periodically to the Congress. On April 1, a Treasury Office of Accounts, consisting of an auditor general and clerks, was established to facilitate the settlement of claims and to keep the public accounts for the government of the United Colonies. With the signing of the Declaration of Independence on July 4, 1776, the newborn republic as a sovereign nation was able to secure loans from abroad.

Despite the infusion of foreign and domestic loans, the united colonies were unable to establish a well-organized agency for financial administration. Michael Hillegas was first called Treasurer of the United States on May 14, 1777. The Treasury Office was reorganized three times between 1778 and 1781. The $241.5 million in paper Continental bills devalued rapidly. By May 1781, the dollar collapsed at a rate of from 500 to 1000 to 1 against hard currency. Protests against the worthless money swept the colonies, giving rise to the expression "not worth a Continental".

=== Late 18th century ===
Since the late 18th century, the office has been customarily referred to as the singular "Treasury", without any preceding article, as a remnant of the country's transition from British to American English. For example, the department notes its guiding purpose as "Treasury's mission" instead of "the Treasury's mission."

Robert Morris was designated Superintendent of Finance in 1781 and restored stability to the nation's finances. Morris, a wealthy colonial merchant, was nicknamed "the financier" because of his reputation for procuring funds or goods on a moment's notice. His staff included a comptroller, a treasurer, a register, and auditors, who managed the country's finances through 1784, when Morris resigned because of ill health. The treasury board, consisting of three commissioners, continued to oversee the finances of the confederation of former colonies until September 1789.

=== Founding ===
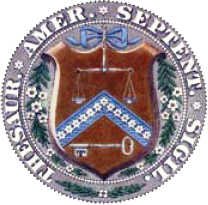
Original seal, dating from before 1968

The First United States Congress convened in New York City on March 4, 1789, marking the beginning of government under the U.S. Constitution. On September 2, 1789, Congress created a permanent institution for the management of government finances:

Be it enacted by the Senate and House of Representatives of the United States of America in Congress assembled, That there shall be a Department of Treasury, in which shall be the following officers, namely: a Secretary of the Treasury, to be deemed head of the department; a Comptroller, an Auditor, a Treasurer, a Register, and an Assistant to the Secretary of the Treasury, which assistant shall be appointed by the said Secretary.

Robert Morris from Pennsylvania, who was also a Second Continental Congress delegate, was Washington's first choice for the position, but declined the appointment. Alexander Hamilton was recommended instead to Washington by Morris. Hamilton took the oath of office as the first secretary of the treasury on September 11, 1789. Hamilton had served as George Washington's aide-de-camp during the American Revolutionary War and was influential in the ratification of the Constitution. Hamilton's financial and managerial acumen made him a logical choice for addressing the problem of the new nation's heavy war debt. His first official act as secretary was to submit a report to Congress in which he laid the foundation for the nation's financial health. Hamilton's portrait appears on the obverse of the ten-dollar bill, while the Treasury Building in Washington, D.C. is depicted on the reverse.

To the surprise of many legislators, he insisted upon federal assumption and dollar-for-dollar repayment of the country's $75 million debt in order to revitalize the public credit: "[T]he debt of the United States was the price of liberty. The faith of America has been repeatedly pledged for it, and with solemnities that give peculiar force to the obligation." Hamilton foresaw the development of industry and trade in the United States, suggesting that government revenues be based upon customs duties. His sound financial policies also inspired investment in the Bank of the United States, which acted as the government's fiscal agent.

The Department of Treasury believes their seal was created by Francis Hopkinson, the treasurer of loans. He submitted bills to Congress in 1780 that authorized the design of department seals, including a seal for the Board of Treasury. While it is not certain that Hopkinson designed the seal, it closely resembles others he created.

=== 19th and 20th centuries ===
In 1861, Sophia Holmes became the first Black woman to be employed by the Treasury Department and by the Federal government of the United States when Senator Henry Wilson, James G. Blaine and others advocated for her hiring as a janitor under Treasurer Francis Spinner. She was paid fifteen dollars per month. In 1862, she prevented a major theft from the department of more than $200,000 when she came across a box filled with U.S. currency, including a number of thousand-dollar bills, and reported it to Spinner.

U.S. president Abraham Lincoln subsequently honored her with a commendation for her actions, and the federal government rewarded her with an appointment for life as a messenger with its department of Issues. Another early woman hired by the department was Jennie Douglas in 1862. Douglas, who was also recruited by Spinner, is sometimes attributed to having been the first woman to have held an appointed position in the federal government.

In response to widespread counterfeiting during the American Civil War, the United States Secret Service was founded within the Treasury Department. In 1870 Secret Service headquarters was moved to New York City but was returned to Washington, D.C., four years later in 1874, where it remains. After the assassination of William McKinley, the Secret Service was tasked with protecting the president, but remained in the Treasury Department.

=== 21st century ===
==== Departmental reorganization ====
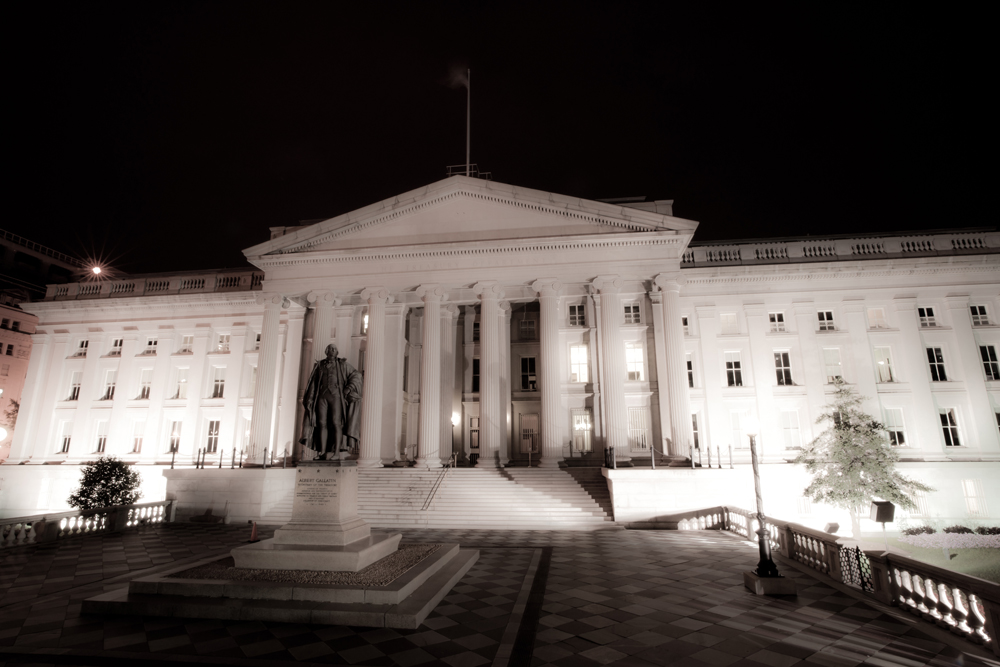
The Treasury Building at 1500 Pennsylvania Avenue, NW in Washington, D.C.

The U.S. Congress transferred several agencies that had previously been under the aegis of the Treasury Department to other departments as a consequence of the September 11 attacks. Effective January 24, 2003, the Bureau of Alcohol, Tobacco and Firearms (ATF), which had been a bureau of the department since 1972, was extensively reorganized under the provisions of the Homeland Security Act of 2002. The law enforcement functions of ATF, including the regulation of legitimate traffic in firearms and explosives, were transferred to the Department of Justice as the Bureau of Alcohol, Tobacco, Firearms, and Explosives (BATFE). The regulatory and tax collection functions of ATF related to legitimate traffic in alcohol and tobacco remained with the treasury at its new Alcohol and Tobacco Tax and Trade Bureau (TTB).

Effective March 1, 2003, the Federal Law Enforcement Training Center, the U.S. Customs Service, and the U.S. Secret Service were transferred to the newly created Department of Homeland Security. In the 2015 Center for Effective Government analysis of the 15 federal agencies that receive the most Freedom of Information Act (FOIA) requests (using 2012 and 2013 data, the most recent years available), Treasury failed to earn a satisfactory overall grade.

==== 2020 data breach ====
In 2020, Treasury suffered a data breach following a cyberattack likely conducted by a nation state adversary, possibly Russia. This was in fact the first detected case of the much wider 2020 United States federal government data breach, which involved at least eight federal departments.

== Responsibilities ==
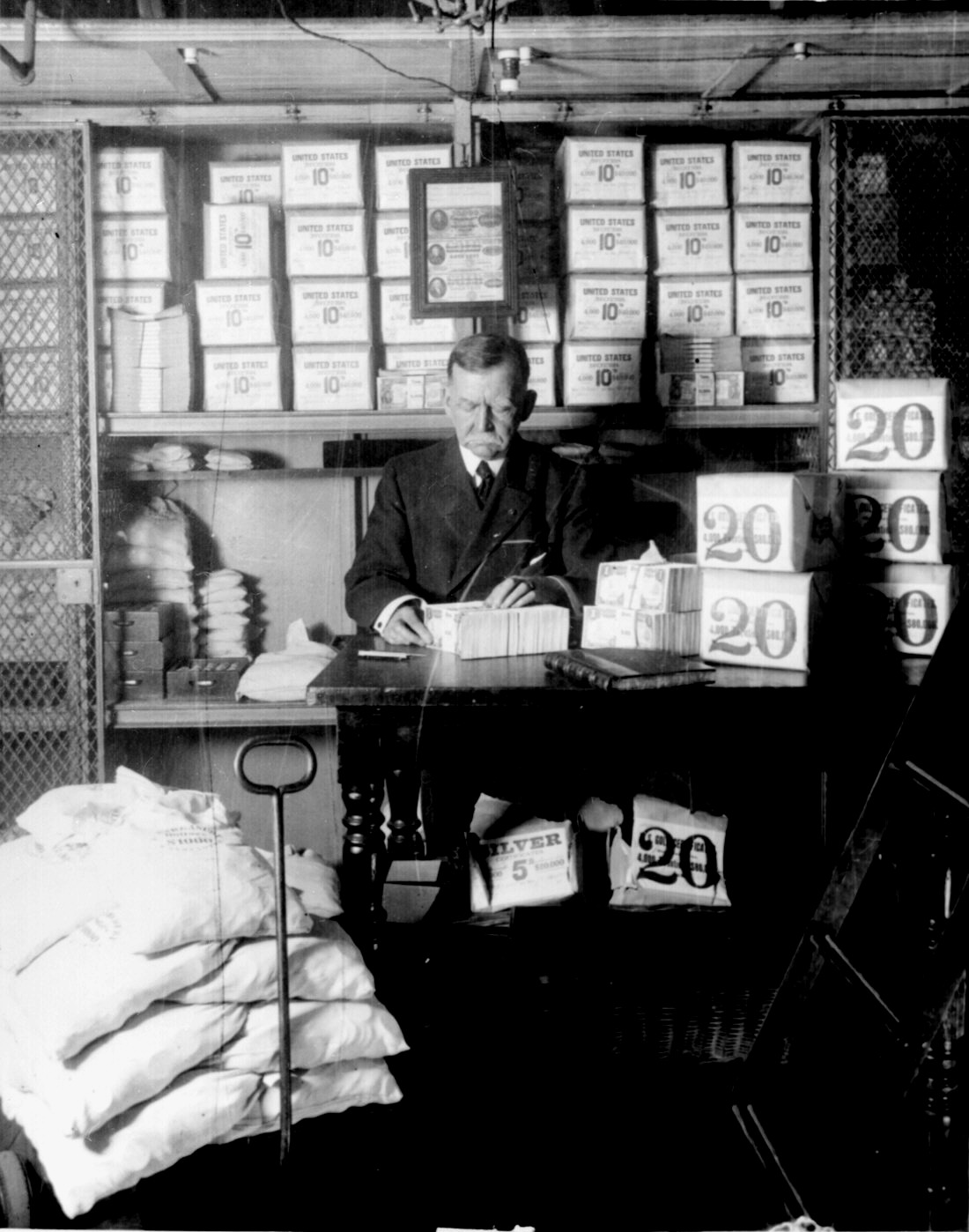
A Treasury Department official surrounded by packages of newly minted currency, counting and wrapping dollar bills in Washington, D.C. in 1907

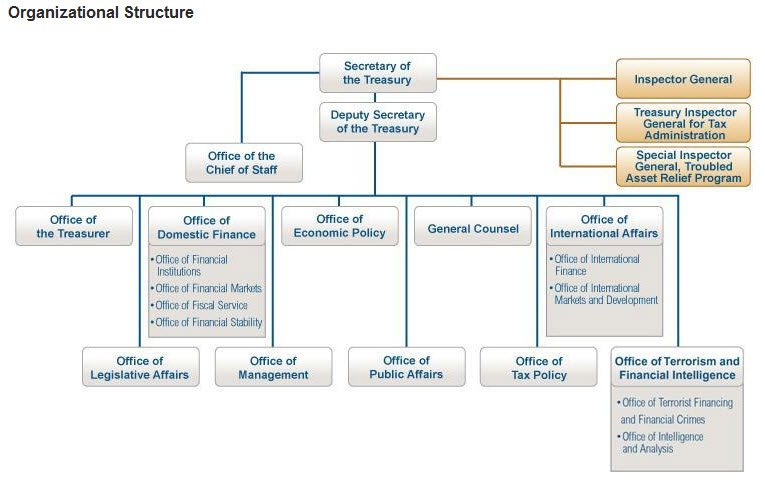
The organizational structure of the U.S. Department of the Treasury

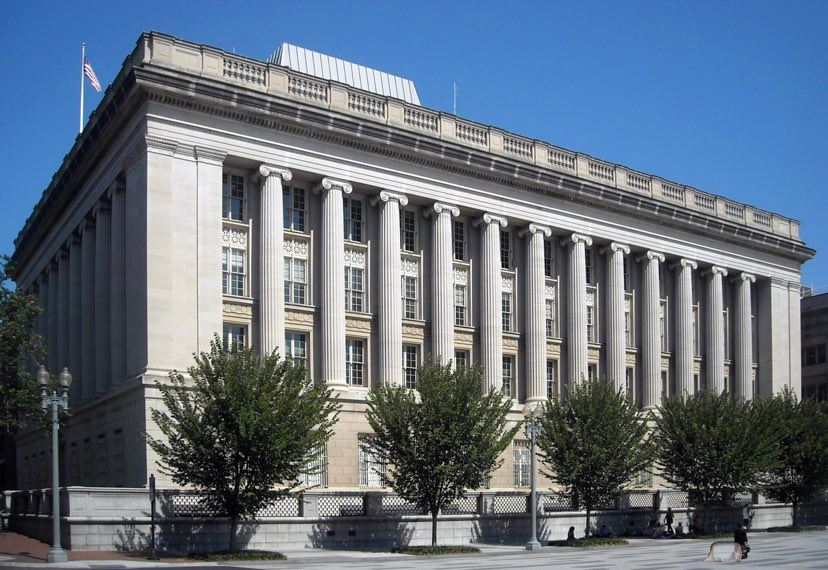
The Office of Foreign Assets Control, the Treasury Library, and the main branch of the Treasury Department Federal Credit Union in the Freedman's Bank Building in Washington, D.C.

=== Basic functions ===
The basic functions of the Department of the Treasury include:

- Producing all currency and coinage of the U.S.;
- Collecting taxes, duties and money paid to and due to the U.S.;
- Paying all bills of the U.S.;
- Managing the federal finances;
- Managing government accounts (including the Treasury General Account) and the United States public debt;
- Supervising national banks and thrift institutions;
- Advising on domestic and international financial, monetary, economic, trade and tax policy (fiscal policy being the sum of these);
- Enforcing federal finance and tax laws;
- Investigating and prosecuting tax evaders;
- Publishing statistical reports

With respect to the estimation of revenues for the executive branch, Treasury serves a purpose parallel to that of the Office of Management and Budget for the estimation of spending for the executive branch, the Joint Committee on Taxation for the estimation of revenues for Congress, and the Congressional Budget Office for the estimation of spending for Congress.

From 1830 until 1901, responsibility for overseeing weights and measures was carried out by the Office of Standard Weights and Measures under the auspices of the Treasury Department. After 1901, that responsibility was assigned to the agency that subsequently became known as the National Institute of Standards and Technology.

== Organization ==
The Department of the Treasury is organized into two major components: the departmental offices and the operating bureaus. The departmental offices are primarily responsible for the formulation of policy and management of the department as a whole, while the operating bureaus carry out the specific operations assigned to the department.

=== Structure ===
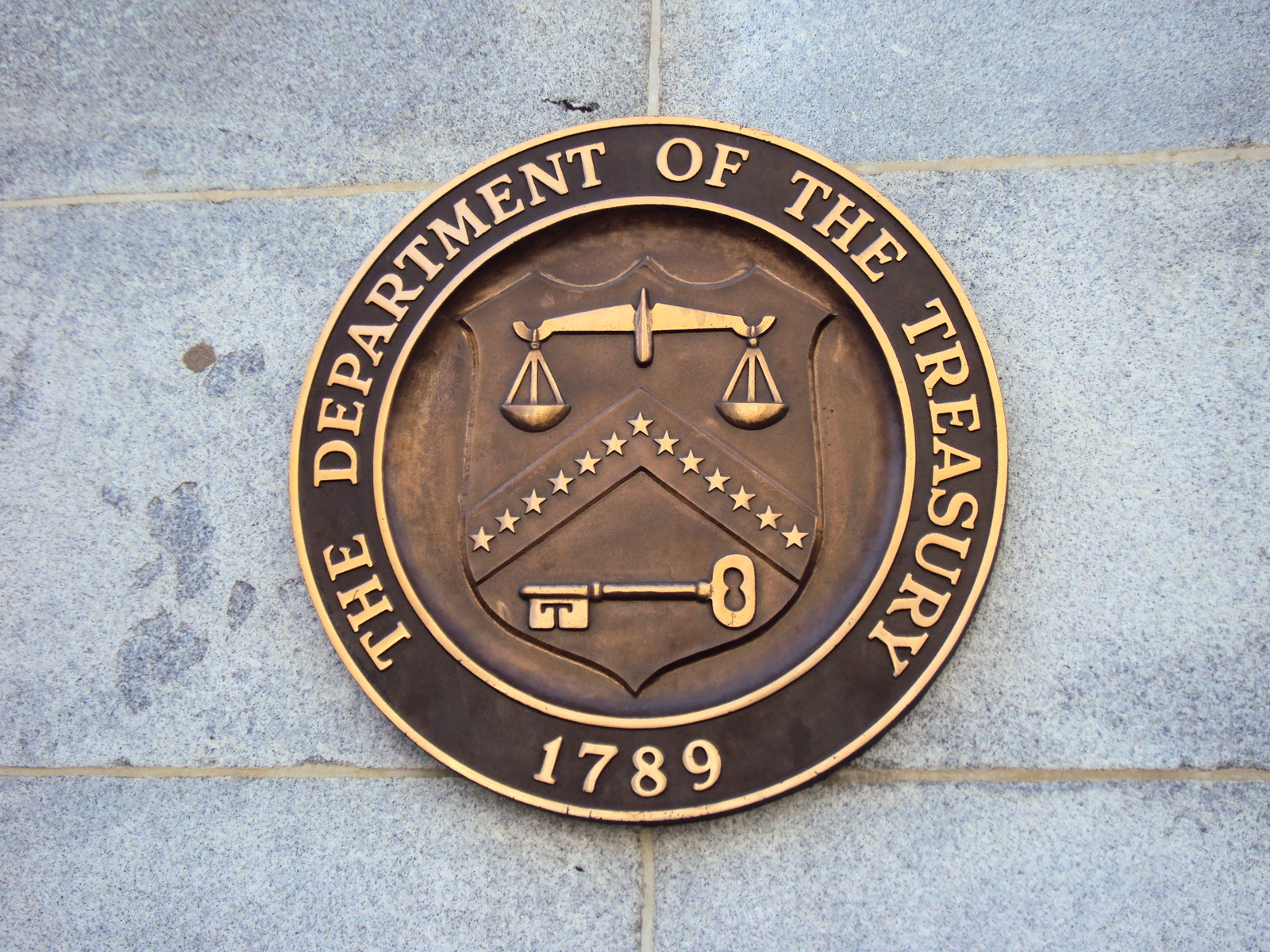
Seal on United States Department of the Treasury on the Building

- Secretary of the Treasury
  - Deputy Secretary of the Treasury
    - Treasurer of the United States
      - Bureau of Engraving and Printing
        - Bureau of Engraving and Printing Police
      - United States Mint
        - United States Mint Police
    - Under Secretary for Domestic Finance
      - Assistant Secretary for Financial Institutions
        - Office of Financial Institutions
      - Assistant Secretary for Financial Markets
        - Office of Financial Markets
      - Fiscal Assistant Secretary
        - Office of Fiscal Service
        - Bureau of the Fiscal Service
    - Under Secretary for International Affairs
      - Assistant Secretary for International Markets and Development
      - Assistant Secretary for International Finance
      - Assistant Secretary of the Treasury for Investment Security
    - Under Secretary for Terrorism and Financial Intelligence (Office of Terrorism and Financial Intelligence)
      - Assistant Secretary for Terrorist Financing
        - Office of Terrorist Financing and Financial Crimes
      - Assistant Secretary for Intelligence and Analysis
        - Office of Intelligence and Analysis
      - Financial Crimes Enforcement Network
      - Office of Foreign Assets Control
      - Treasury Executive Office for Asset Forfeiture
    - Assistant Secretary of the Treasury for Management
      - Office of Small and Disadvantaged Business Utilization
      - Chief Information Officer
    - Assistant Secretary for Economic Policy
    - Assistant Secretary for Legislative Affairs
    - Assistant Secretary for Public Affairs
    - Assistant Secretary for Tax Policy
    - Commissioner of Internal Revenue
      - Internal Revenue Service
    - Office of the Comptroller of the Currency
    - Office of Financial Research
    - Office of the General Counsel
    - Office of the Inspector General
    - Treasury Inspector General for Tax Administration (TIGTA)
    - Chief Risk Officer

=== Bureaus ===
Bureau	Description
Alcohol and Tobacco Tax and Trade Bureau (TTB)	The Alcohol and Tobacco Tax and Trade Bureau (TTB) is responsible for enforcing and administering laws covering the production, use, and distribution of alcohol and tobacco products. TTB also collects excise taxes for firearms and ammunition.
Bureau of Engraving and Printing (BEP)	The Bureau of Engraving and Printing (BEP) designs and manufactures U.S. currency, securities, and other official certificates and awards.
Bureau of the Fiscal Service	The Bureau of the Fiscal Service was formed from the consolidation of the Financial Management Service and the Bureau of the Public Debt. Its mission is to promote the financial integrity and operational efficiency of the U.S. government through exceptional accounting, financing, collections, payments, and shared services.
Community Development Financial Institution (CDFI) Fund	The Community Development Financial Institution (CDFI) Fund was created to expand the availability of credit, investment capital, and financial services in distressed urban and rural communities.
Financial Crimes Enforcement Network (FinCEN)	The Financial Crimes Enforcement Network (FinCEN) supports law enforcement investigative efforts and fosters interagency and global cooperation against domestic and international financial crimes. It also provides U.S. policymakers with strategic analyses of domestic and worldwide trends and patterns.
Inspector General	The Inspector General conducts independent audits, investigations and reviews to help the Treasury Department accomplish its mission; improve its programs and operations; promote economy, efficiency and effectiveness; and prevent and detect fraud and abuse.
Treasury Inspector General for Tax Administration (TIGTA)	The Treasury Inspector General for Tax Administration (TIGTA) provides leadership and coordination and recommends policy for activities designed to promote economy, efficiency, and effectiveness in the administration of the internal revenue laws. TIGTA also recommends policies to prevent and detect fraud and abuse in the programs and operations of the IRS and related entities.
Internal Revenue Service	The Internal Revenue Service (IRS) is the largest of Treasury's bureaus. It is responsible for determining, assessing, and collecting internal revenue in the United States.
Office of the Comptroller of the Currency (OCC)	The Office of the Comptroller of the Currency (OCC) charters, regulates, and supervises national banks to ensure a safe, sound, and competitive banking system that supports the citizens, communities, and economy of the United States.
U.S. Mint	The U.S. Mint designs and manufactures domestic, bullion and foreign coins as well as commemorative medals and other numismatic items. The Mint also distributes U.S. coins to the Federal Reserve banks as well as maintains physical custody and protection of the nation's silver and gold assets.

=== Budget and staffing ===
The Treasury Department has authorized a budget for Fiscal Year 2024 of $16.5 billion. The budget authorization is broken down as follows:

Program	Funding (in millions)
Management and Finance
Department Administration	$273
Office of the Inspector General	$49
Inspector General for Tax Administration	$174
Special Inspector General for TARP (Troubled Asset Relief Program)	$9
Community Development Financial Institutions Fund	$324
Financial Crimes Enforcement Network	$190
Alcohol and Tobacco Tax and Trade Bureau	$149
Bureau of the Fiscal Services	$373
Other	$339
Tax Administration
Internal Revenue Service	$12,319
International Programs
International Programs	$2,364
Other
Other	$293
TOTAL	$16,517

== See also ==
- Federal Reserve System
- MicroLoan Program
- Title 12 of the Code of Federal Regulations
- Title 17 of the Code of Federal Regulations
- Title 19 of the Code of Federal Regulations
- Title 31 of the Code of Federal Regulations
- Treasury Enterprise Architecture Framework
- Treasury Information System Architecture Framework
- United States Coast Guard History and Heritage Sites
