= List of Department of the Treasury appointments by Donald Trump =

Key
Appointees serving in offices that did not require Senate confirmation.
Appointees confirmed by the Senate.
Appointees awaiting Senate confirmation.
Appointees serving in an acting capacity.
Appointees who have left office or offices which have been disbanded.
Nominees who were withdrawn prior to being confirmed or assuming office.

== Appointments (second administration) ==
Office	Nominee	Assumed office	Left office
Secretary of the Treasury	Scott Bessent	January 28, 2025 (Confirmed January 27, 2025, 68–29)	
Secretary of the Treasury	David Lebryk	January 20, 2025	January 28, 2025
Deputy Secretary of the Treasury	Francis Brooke	September 22, 2026 (Confirmed* August 7, 2026, 51–47); *En bloc confirmation of 74 nominees.	
Deputy Secretary of the Treasury	Francis Brooke	April 28, 2026	September 22, 2026
Deputy Secretary of the Treasury	Derek Theurer	October 7, 2025	April 28, 2026
Deputy Secretary of the Treasury	Michael Faulkender	March 28, 2025 (Confirmed March 26, 2025, 53–43)	August 22, 2025
Deputy Secretary of the Treasury	Dan Katz	February 3, 2025	March 28, 2025
Deputy Secretary of the Treasury	David Lebryk	January 20, 2025	January 31, 2025
General Counsel of the Treasury	Robert Stebbins	Awaiting Senate Confirmation	
General Counsel of the Treasury	Brian Morrissey, Jr.	October 2025 (Confirmed* October 7, 2025, 51–47); *En bloc confirmation of 107 nominees.	May 18, 2026
General Counsel of the Treasury	Chris Pilkerton	February 27, 2025	October 2025
General Counsel of the Treasury	Brain Sonfield	January 21, 2025	February 27, 2025
Under Secretary of the Treasury for Terrorism and Financial Intelligence	John Hurley	July 31, 2025 (Confirmed July 23, 2025, 51–47)	April 28, 2026
Under Secretary of the Treasury for Terrorism and Financial Intelligence	Bradley Smith	January 20, 2025	July 31, 2025
Under Secretary of the Treasury for Domestic Finance	Francis Browne	Awaiting Senate Confirmation	
Under Secretary of the Treasury for Domestic Finance	Jonathan McKernan	October 10, 2025 (Confirmed* October 7, 2025, 51–47); *En bloc confirmation of 107 nominees.	July 20, 2026
Under Secretary of the Treasury for Domestic Finance	Luke Pettit	July 29, 2025	October 10, 2025
Under Secretary of the Treasury for Domestic Finance	Brian Smith	January 20, 2025	July 29, 2025
Under Secretary of the Treasury for International Affairs	Erin Browne	August 7, 2026 (Confirmed* August 7, 2026, 51–47); *En bloc confirmation of 74 nominees.	
Under Secretary of the Treasury for International Affairs	Francis Brooke	October 7, 2025	April 28, 2026
Deputy Under Secretary of the Treasury for International Finance	Jonathan Greenstein	December 2025 (Confirmed* December 18, 2025, 53–43); *En bloc confirmation of 97 nominees.	
Assistant Secretary of the Treasury for Financial Markets	George Hunter McMaster II	TBD (Confirmed* August 7, 2026, 51–47); *En bloc confirmation of 74 nominees.	
Assistant Secretary of the Treasury for Financial Markets	Jason De Sena Trennert	Nomination withdrawn by the President on July 30, 2025	
Assistant Secretary of the Treasury for Financial Markets	George Hunter McMaster II	July 29, 2025	April 28, 2026
Assistant Secretary of the Treasury for Financial Markets	Brian Smith	January 20, 2025	July 29, 2025
Assistant Secretary for Intelligence and Analysis	Peter Metzger	December 18, 2025 (Confirmed* December 18, 2025, 53–43); *En bloc confirmation of 97 nominees.	
Assistant Secretary of the Treasury for International Trade and Development	Jeremy Wiggins	Awaiting Senate Confirmation	
Assistant Secretary of the Treasury for International Trade and Development	Francis Brooke	October 2025 (Confirmed* October 7, 2025, 51–47); *En bloc confirmation of 107 nominees.	September 22, 2026
Assistant Secretary of the Treasury for Investment Security	Chris Pilkerton	January 5, 2026 (Confirmed* December 18, 2025, 53–43); *En bloc confirmation of 97 nominees.	
Assistant Secretary of the Treasury for Tax Policy	Kevin Salinger	July 17, 2026	
Assistant Secretary of the Treasury for Tax Policy	Ken Kies	July 14, 2025 (Confirmed June 26, 2025, 53–45)	July 17, 2026
Assistant Secretary of the Treasury for Terrorist Financing	Jonathan Burke	April 14, 2026 (Confirmed* December 18, 2025, 53–43); *En bloc confirmation of 97 nominees.	
Assistant Secretary of the Treasury for Financial Institutions	Luke Pettit	July 28, 2025 (Confirmed July 15, 2025, 69–30)	
Assistant Secretary of the Treasury for Financial Institutions	Steven Seitz	January 20, 2025	July 28, 2025
Assistant Secretary of the Treasury for Economic Policy	Sriprakash Kothari	TBD (Confirmed* August 7, 2026, 51–47); *En bloc confirmation of 74 nominees.	
Assistant Secretary of the Treasury for Legislative Affairs	Derek Theurer	December 2025 (Confirmed* December 18, 2025, 53–43); *En bloc confirmation of 97 nominees.	July 3, 2026
Director of the United States Mint	Paul Hollis	January 5, 2026 (Confirmed* December 18, 2025, 53–43); *En bloc confirmation of 97 nominees.	
Director of the United States Mint	Kristie McNally	March 31, 2025	January 5, 2026
Chief of Staff to the Secretary of the Treasury	Dan Katz	January 20, 2025	October 6, 2025
Deputy Chief of Staff and Senior Counselor to the Secretary of the Treasury	Alexandra Preate	January 20, 2025	
Director of Policy Planning	Hunter McMaster	January 20, 2025	
Treasurer of the United States	Brandon Beach	May 28, 2025	
Office of the Comptroller of the Currency
Comptroller of the Currency	Jonathan Gould	July 15, 2025 (Confirmed July 10, 2025, 50–45)	
Comptroller of the Currency	Rodney E. Hood	February 10, 2025	July 15, 2025
Internal Revenue Service
Commissioner of Internal Revenue	Scott Bessent	August 8, 2025	March 6, 2026
Commissioner of Internal Revenue	Billy Long	June 16, 2025 (Confirmed June 12, 2025, 53–44)	August 8, 2025
Commissioner of Internal Revenue	Michael Faulkender	April 18, 2025	June 16, 2025
Commissioner of Internal Revenue	Gary Shapley	April 16, 2025	April 18, 2025
Commissioner of Internal Revenue	Melanie Krause	February 28, 2025	April 16, 2025
Commissioner of Internal Revenue	Douglas O'Donnell	January 20, 2025	February 28, 2025
General Counsel of the Internal Revenue Service	Donald Korb	Nomination withdrawn by the President on November 18, 2025	

== Appointments (first administration) ==
Office	Nominee	Assumed office	Left office
Secretary of the Treasury	Steven Mnuchin	February 13, 2017 (Confirmed February 13, 2017, 53–47)	January 20, 2021
Deputy Secretary of the Treasury	Justin Muzinich	December 12, 2018 (Confirmed December 11, 2018, 55–44)	January 20, 2021
General Counsel of the Treasury	Vacant		
Under Secretary of the Treasury (Domestic Finance)	Vacant		
Under Secretary of the Treasury (International Affairs)	Brent McIntosh	September 2019 (Confirmed September 18, 2019, 54–38)	January 20, 2021
Under Secretary of the Treasury (Terrorism and Financial Crimes)	Sigal Mandelker	June 26, 2017	October 3, 2019
Deputy Under Secretary of the Treasury (International Finance)	Vacant		
Assistant Secretary of the Treasury (Legislative Affairs)	Brian McGuire	September 2019 (Confirmed September 24, 2019, 88–6)	April 2, 2020
Assistant Secretary of the Treasury (Economic Policy)	Michael Faulkender	August 28, 2019 (Confirmed August 1, 2019, voice vote)	January 20, 2021
Assistant Secretary of the Treasury (Financial Institutions)	Bimal Patel	June 27, 2019 (Confirmed June 20, 2019, voice vote)	July 1, 2020
Assistant Secretary of the Treasury (Financial Markets)	Vacant		
Assistant Secretary of the Treasury (Intelligence and Analysis)	Izzy Patelunas	September 17, 2018 (Confirmed August 28, 2018, 75–20)	January 20, 2021
Assistant Secretary of the Treasury (International Markets and Development)	Mitchell Silk	April 21, 2020 (Confirmed April 21, 2020, voice vote)	January 20, 2021
Assistant Secretary of the Treasury (Investment Security)	Thomas Feddo	September 27, 2019 (Confirmed September 12, 2019, 85–1)	January 20, 2021
Assistant Secretary of the Treasury (Tax Policy)	David Kautter	September 25, 2017 (Confirmed August 3, 2017, voice vote)	January 20, 2021
Assistant Secretary of the Treasury (Terrorist Financing)	Marshall Billingslea	June 22, 2017	January 20, 2021
Comptroller of the Currency	Brian P. Brooks	May 29, 2020	January 14, 2021
Inspector General	Richard Delmar	June 30, 2019	
Assistant Secretary of the Treasury (Management), Chief Financial Officer, Chief Performance Officer	David F. Eisner	April 30, 2018 (Appointed March 28, 2018)	January 20, 2021
Assistant Secretary of the Treasury (Public Affairs)	Monica Crowley	July 24, 2019 (Appointed July 16, 2019)	January 20, 2021
Director of the United States Mint	David J. Ryder	April 12, 2018 (Confirmed March 21, 2018, voice vote)	
Special Inspector General for Pandemic Recovery	Brian D. Miller	June 5, 2020 (Confirmed June 2, 2020, 51–40)	
Internal Revenue Service
Commissioner of the Internal Revenue Service	Charles P. Rettig	October 1, 2018 (Confirmed September 12, 2018, 64–33)	
General Counsel of the Internal Revenue Service	Michael J. Desmond	March 8, 2019 (Confirmed February 27, 2019, 83–15)	
Financial Stability Oversight Council
Member of the Financial Stability Oversight Council	Thomas E. Workman	March 29, 2018 (Confirmed March 21, 2018, voice vote)	January 20, 2021
Federal Deposit Insurance Corporation
Chairperson of the Board of Directors of the Federal Deposit Insurance Corporation	Jelena McWilliams	June 5, 2018 (Confirmed May 24, 2018, 69–24)	
Office of Financial Research
Director of the Office of Financial Research	Dino Falaschetti	June 27, 2019 (Confirmed June 20, 2019, voice vote)	
Community Development Advisory Board
Member of the Community Development Advisory Board	Shane Jett	September 2017	
Member of the Community Development Advisory Board	Judy J. Chapa	September 2017	
Member of the Community Development Advisory Board	Cara Dingus Brook	September 2017	
Member of the Community Development Advisory Board	Faith Bautista	September 2017	
Member of the Community Development Advisory Board	Robert R. Jones III	September 2017	
Member of the Community Development Advisory Board	Todd McDonald	September 2017	
Member of the Community Development Advisory Board	Clint Gwin	September 2017	
Member of the Community Development Advisory Board	Gregory B. Fairchild	December 2017	
Member of the Community Development Advisory Board	Raymond Moncrief	December 2017	

== Previous officeholders (first administration) ==
Office	Name	Took office	Left office	Notes
Secretary of the Treasury	Adam Szubin	January 20, 2017	February 13, 2017	
Under Secretary of the Treasury (Terrorism and Financial Intelligence)	Adam Szubin	April 16, 2015	February 13, 2017	
Deputy Secretary of the Treasury	Sigal Mandelker	June 26, 2017	December 12, 2018	
Under Secretary of the Treasury (Terrorism and Financial Intelligence)	Sigal Mandelker	June 26, 2017	October 3, 2019	
Under Secretary of the Treasury (International Affairs)	David Malpass	September 25, 2017	April 9, 2019	Became President of the World Bank.
Assistant Secretary of the Treasury (Financial Institutions)	Christopher Campbell	September 25, 2017	July 31, 2018	
Assistant Secretary of the Treasury (Financial Institutions)	Bimal Patel	June 27, 2019	July 1, 2020	
Assistant Secretary of the Treasury (Legislative Affairs)	Drew Maloney	August 2017	June 11, 2018	
Assistant Secretary of the Treasury (Public Affairs)	Tony Sayegh	March 6, 2017	June 2019	
Chief of Staff to the Secretary of the Treasury	Eli H. Miller		April 2019	
Counselor to the Secretary of the Treasury	Craig Phillips	2017	June 2019	
Treasurer of the United States	Jovita Carranza	June 19, 2017	January 13, 2020	Became Administrator of the Small Business Administration.

== Notes ==
=== Confirmation votes ===
Confirmations by roll call vote (first administration)

Confirmations by voice vote (first administration)

Confirmations by roll call vote (second administration)

Confirmations by voice vote (second administration)
