= Elizabeth Rosenberg =

American government official

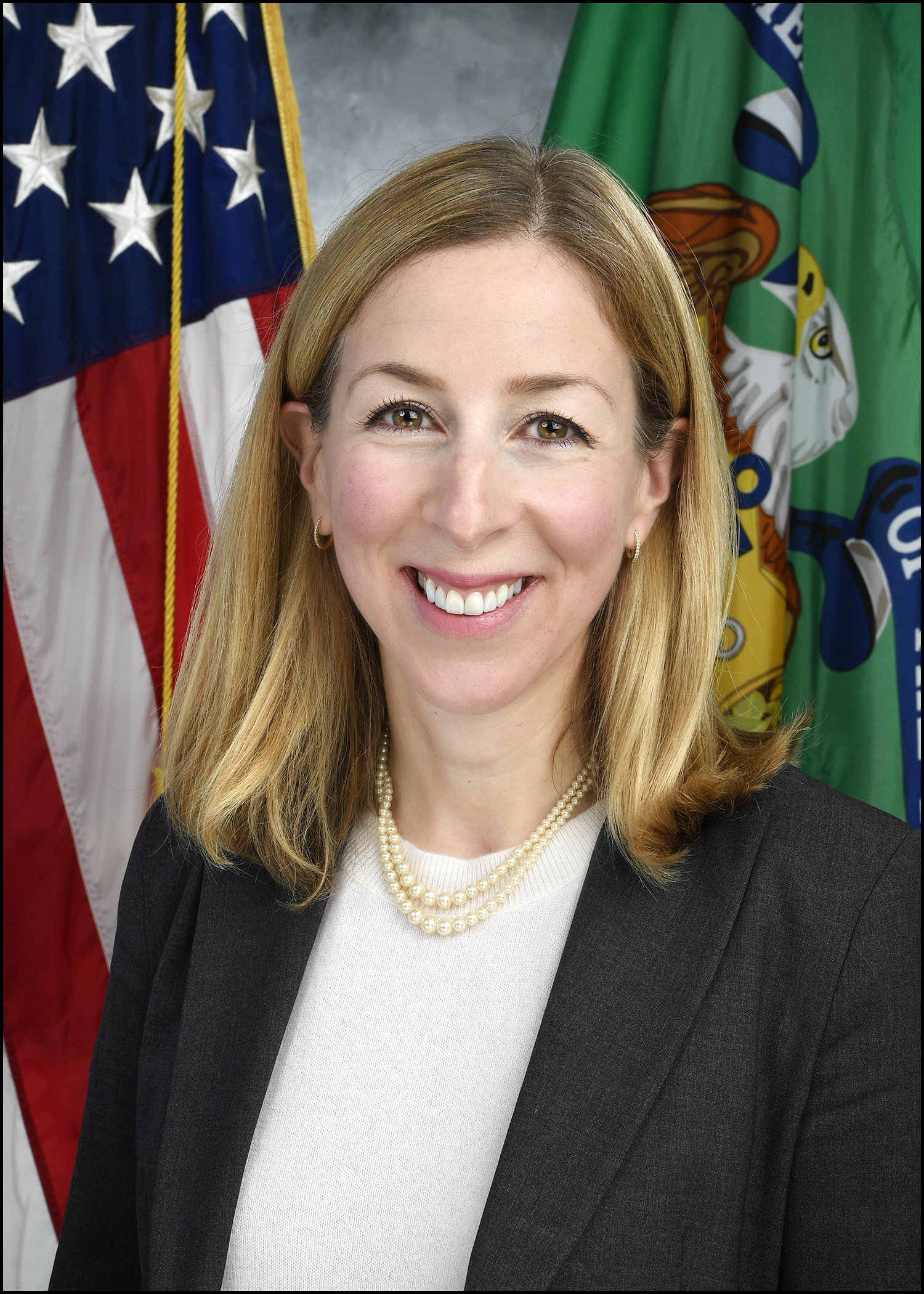

Assistant Secretary of the Treasury for Terrorist Financing
- In office January 11, 2022 – February 1, 2024
- President: Joe Biden
- Preceded by: Marshall Billingslea
- Succeeded by: Jonathan Burke

Personal details
- Education: Oberlin College (BA); New York University (MA)

Elizabeth Rosenberg is a former American government official who served as Assistant Secretary of the Treasury for Terrorist Financing in the Biden administration, having been confirmed on December 18, 2021, by the United States Senate.

== Education ==
Rosenberg earned a Bachelor of Arts degree in Politics and Religion from Oberlin College and a Master of Arts in Near Eastern studies and Arabic from New York University.

== Career ==
After earning her master's degree, Rosenberg worked as an energy policy correspondent for Argus Media. She then joined the Office of Terrorist Financing and Financial Crimes, working as a senior advisor to the assistant secretary. From 2013 to 2021, Rosenberg was a fellow at the Center for a New American Security. In January 2021, she became the counselor to United States Deputy Secretary of the Treasury, Wally Adeyemo.

=== Nomination for Treasury Role ===
President Joe Biden nominated Rosenberg to be an Assistant Secretary of the Treasury for Terrorist Financing on May 26, 2021. The Senate Banking Committee held hearings on her nomination on June 22, 2021. The committee deadlocked on her nomination on October 5, 2021. On December 18, 2021, the entire Senate discharged Rosenberg's nomination from the committee and confirmed her by voice vote.

Rosenberg resigned her position in February 2024 to take a job in the private sector.
