= Brian D. Miller =

Brian D. Miller may refer to:

- Brian Miller (New York politician), American politician
- Brian D. Miller (attorney), American attorney
