= Dan Katz =

American lawyer (born 1987)

Daniel Katz
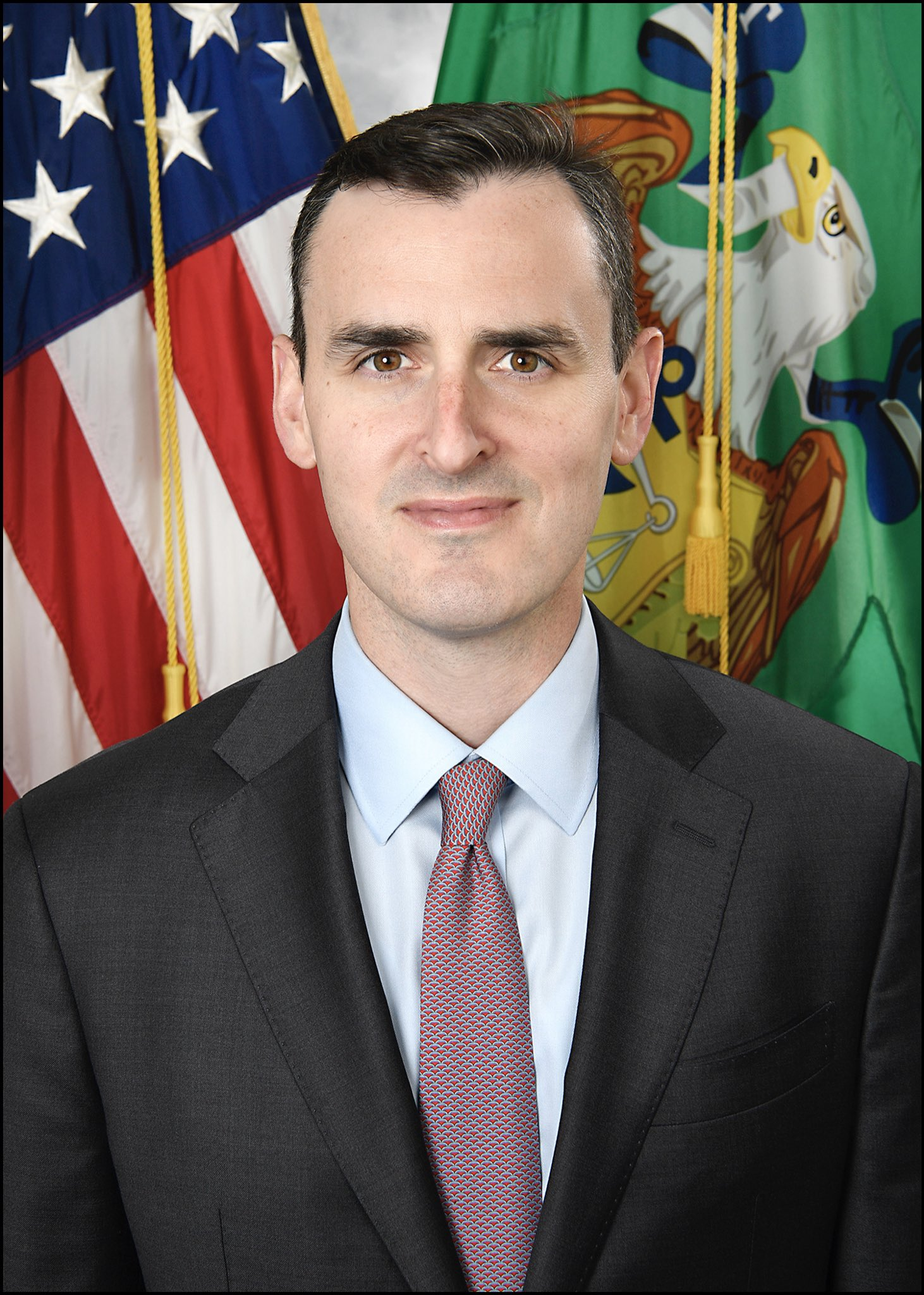
- Official portrait, 2025

First Deputy Managing Director of the International Monetary Fund
- Incumbent
- Assumed office October 6, 2025
- Director: Kristalina Georgieva
- Preceded by: Gita Gopinath

Chief of Staff to the United States Secretary of the Treasury
- In office January 20, 2025 – October 6, 2025
- President: Donald Trump
- Secretary: David Lebryk (acting); Scott Bessent
- Preceded by: Didem Nisanci
- Succeeded by: Michael Friedman

United States Deputy Secretary of the Treasury
- Acting
- In office February 3, 2025 – March 28, 2025
- President: Donald Trump
- Secretary: Scott Bessent
- Preceded by: David Lebryk (acting)
- Succeeded by: Michael Faulkender

Personal details
- Born: Daniel Scott Katz; December 1987 (age 38)
- Party: Republican
- Spouse: Hillary Coleman (m. 2019)
- Education: Yale University (BA); New York University (JD)

Daniel Scott Katz (born December 1987) is an American lawyer who has served as the first deputy managing director of the International Monetary Fund since October 2025. Katz served as the chief of staff to the United States secretary of the treasury from January to October 2025.

== Early life and education (1987–2016) ==
Daniel Scott Katz was born in December 1987. He attended Fieldston High School. Katz graduated from Yale University with a bachelor's degree and the New York University School of Law with a Juris Doctor.

== Career ==
=== Advisorship and private sector work (2011–2025) ===
Katz worked as a policy advisor at the United States Department of the Treasury from 2011 to 2013 and was a senior advisor in the first Trump administration, where he helped lead the department's bailout of airlines amid the COVID-19 pandemic. He is a certified sommelier. In September 2019, Katz married Hillary Anne Coleman. By 2024, he was involved at the Manhattan Institute.

=== Chief of staff to the secretary of the treasury (January–October 2025) ===
By January 2025, Katz had been set to be appointed the chief of staff to the chief of staff to the United States secretary of the treasury. As chief of staff, he sought to force the Department of the Treasury's payments system, managed by the Bureau of the Fiscal Service, to grant access to Department of Government Efficiency workers. Katz was involved in a group chat that was leaked to The Atlantic's editor-in-chief, Jeffrey Goldberg.

=== First Deputy Managing Director of the International Monetary Fund (2025–present) ===
In September 2025, The New York Times reported that the Trump administration was set to propose Katz as the first deputy managing director of the International Monetary Fund. On September 18, Kristalina Georgieva, the fund's managing director, named Katz to the position.

== Views ==
In March 2024, Katz and Stephen Miran called for reforms to the Federal Reserve, including decreasing the terms of members from fourteen years to eight years, allowing members to be fired by the president, and allowing state governors to appoint Federal Reserve bank board members.

== Works cited ==
=== Articles ===
- Davidson, Kate (June 23, 2022). "GOP to Powell: Play by the rules". Politico.
- Duehren, Andrew; Rappeport, Alan; Schleifer, Theodore (February 2, 2025). "Treasury Sought to Freeze Foreign Aid Payments, Emails Show". The New York Times.
- Lawder, David (September 18, 2025). "IMF names Bessent's chief of staff Katz to No. 2 post". Reuters.
- McCarthy, Mia; Harty, Declan (December 22, 2024). "Stephen Miran is Trump's pick to lead Council of Economic Advisers". Politico.
- Mehrotra, Dhruv; Marchman, Tim (March 27, 2025). "Even More Venmo Accounts Tied to Trump Officials in Signal Group Chat Left Data Public". Wired.
- Nichols Gray, Ali (September 25, 2019). "Hillary Anne Coleman & Daniel Scott Katz". Moffly Media.
- Rappeport, Alan (September 17, 2025). "Top Bessent Aide, Daniel Katz, Expected to Be Tapped as No. 2 at I.M.F." The New York Times.
- Sutton, Sam (January 7, 2025). "Trump just won his first battle with the Fed without lifting a finger". Politico.

=== Documents ===
- "Daniel Scott Katz in the U.S., Index to Public Records, 1994-2019" (Document). Index to Public Records.

Political offices
Preceded by David Lebryk; Acting	United States Deputy Secretary of the Treasury; Acting; 2025	Succeeded by Michael Faulkender
