= L. V. Sutton =

United States military officer, engineer, and executive

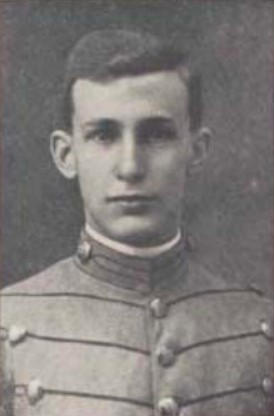
Sutton in 1910

Louis Valvelle Sutton (August 6, 1889 – January 5, 1970) was an American engineer and electric utility executive who served as the head of Carolina Power & Light from 1933 to 1969.

== Early life ==
Louis Valvelle Sutton was born on August 6, 1889, in Richmond, Virginia, United States, to Lee Edwards Sutton and Ella Wagner Sutton. When he was 14, the family moved to Petersburg. He graduated from the Petersburg Academy and secured a degree in electrical engineering from the Virginia Polytechnic Institute in 1910. He married Cantey McDowell Venable on April 30, 1912, and had two children with her.

== Career ==
Sutton initially trained as an apprentice engineer for General Electric in Lynn, Massachusetts. Once he was married, he became keen on living in North Carolina (where his wife was from). He visited Paul A. Tillery, chief engineer of Carolina Power & Light (CP&L), to personally request a job. He took work as a statistician with the utility in 1912, though it paid less than his General Electric salary. He was eventually promoted to commercial manager, and in that capacity he supervised local office managers and salesmen, whom he urged to pursue growth through increased electrical service to homeowners. As part of this, he arranged for an electric stove to be installed in the home economics department of Meredith College and published an "electric cookbook". As a result of his initiatives, he was promoted to serve as a personal assistant to Tillery. In August 1924 Sutton moved to Little Rock, Arkansas, to become assistant general manager of the Arkansas Central Power Company. In 1927 he became vice-president and general manager of the fledgling Mississippi Power and Light Company in Jackson, Mississippi.

Tillery fell ill in 1932, and Sutton moved back to North Carolina to become CP&L vice president. Tillery died the following January, and Sutton was elected president and general manager of the company on March 23, 1933. The Great Depression stressed the finances of the utility, as homeowners cut their electricity usage to save money while the company had invested in more facilities and power lines to reach more customers. Instead of raising prices, Sutton instituted a lower "inducement rate" to encourage homeowners to continue using CP&L electricity. He was also wary of potential government takeovers and increasing competition from public utilities such as the Tennessee Valley Authority, and frequently advocated for investor control of electric companies. As a result of this, he was elected president of the Edison Electric Institute—a national association of privately owned power companies—in 1950. North Carolina Governor Kerr Scott, a proponent of public utilities and frustrated by the lack of rural electrification in the state, became openly critical of Sutton. He mocked his initials in a press conference in November 1950 by referring to him as "Low Voltage Sutton". Many state newspapers credited Scott with coining the phrase, though some of Sutton's older coworkers had used it in years prior. In private the two men enjoyed a more harmonious relationship; they exchanged cigars at Christmas.

Under Sutton's leadership, CP&L's customer base expanded from 62,500 to 530,000 users, while the company's assets increased sevenfold. He retired from the post of chief executive officer of Carolina Power & Light in January 1969, but remained chairman of its board of directors. He died on January 5, 1970, at Rex Hospital in Raleigh, North Carolina, after suffering from illness for several weeks. He was buried at Montlawn Memorial Park in Raleigh.

== Works cited ==
- Christensen, Rob (2019). The Rise and Fall of the Branchhead Boys: North Carolina's Scott Family and the Era of Progressive Politics. Chapel Hill: The University of North Carolina Press. ISBN 9781469651057.
