= Jonathan Davidson (lawyer) =

Lawyer and former American government official

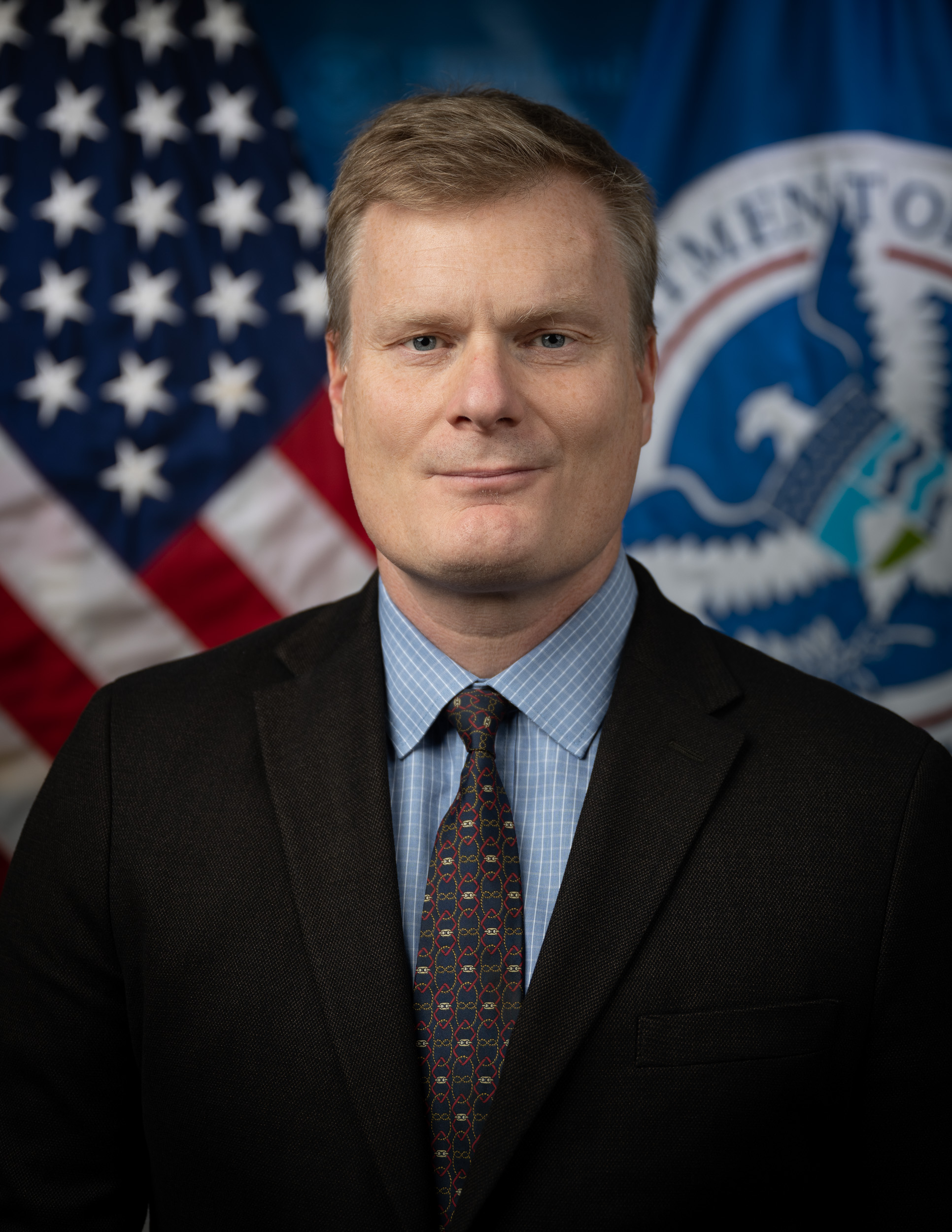

Chief of Staff of the United States Department of Homeland Security
- In office August 2023 – January 2025
- President: Joe Biden
- Preceded by: Kristie Canegallo
- Succeeded by: Dave Natonski

Assistant Secretary of the Treasury for Legislative Affairs
- In office November 15, 2021 – August 12, 2023
- President: Joe Biden
- Preceded by: Brian T. McGuire
- Succeeded by: Derek Theurer

Personal details
- Born: July 26, 1971 (age 55) New York City, U.S.
- Education: University of North Carolina, Chapel Hill; Georgetown University

Jonathan Davidson is a lawyer and former U.S. government official who most recently served as the chief of staff of the United States Department of Homeland Security from August 2023 to January 2025. He previously served as the assistant secretary of the Treasury for legislative affairs from 2021 to 2023.

== Life ==
Davidson is a graduate of the University of North Carolina at Chapel Hill and the Georgetown University Law Center. He clerked for chief judge William K. Sessions III of the United States District Court for the District of Vermont.

Davidson served as chief of staff to U.S. senator Paul Sarbanes and U.S. representative John Sarbanes, and chief counsel to U.S. senator Mark Warner. He also served as the Biden-Harris Transition’s economic nominations confirmation team lead after the 2020 United States presidential election. Davidson worked as an adjunct professor at American University School of Public Affairs, periodically teaching a class on the legislative and political processes. Davidson worked on Capitol Hill for more than two decades. He served as U.S. senator Michael Bennet’s chief of staff from 2011 to 2020. He played a role in the passage of the child tax credit portion of the American Rescue Plan Act of 2021.

Davidson joined the United States Department of the Treasury as the counselor to secretary Janet Yellen. In 2021, he was nominated by U.S. president Joe Biden to serve assistant secretary of the Treasury for legislative affairs, succeeding Brian T. McGuire. He was confirmed by the U.S. senate in a 88–10 vote on November 2 and assumed office on the November 15. He helped lead the Treasury's efforts to pass and implement the Inflation Reduction Act and worked on a range of national security issues, including the Biden administration’s efforts in response to the Russian invasion of Ukraine and its push to diversify global supply chains. He resigned from his Treasury Department positions in 2023.

On July 20, 2023, Davidson was named as the incoming chief of staff of the United States Department of Homeland Security, following the elevation of Kristie Canegallo to acting deputy secretary. He assumed the role in August 2023.

In early 2025, Davidson joined the law firm WilmerHale as Senior Counsel.

Political offices
Preceded by Brian T. McGuire	Assistant Secretary of the Treasury for Legislative Affairs; 2021–2023	Succeeded by Derek Theurer
Preceded by Kristie Canegallo	Chief of Staff of the United States Department of Homeland Security; 2023–2025	Succeeded by Dave Natonski
