= Assistant Secretary of the Treasury for Legislative Affairs =

Official in the U.S. Treasury Department

- Flag of an Assistant Secretary of the Treasury
- Incumbent; Mason Champion; Acting since July 3, 2026
- Office of Legislative Affairs
- Style: The Honorable
- Reports to: Secretary of the Treasury; Deputy Secretary of the Treasury
- Nominator: President of the United States
- Formation: May 18, 1972
- First holder: James E. Smith
- Deputy: Principal Deputy Assistant Secretary for Legislative Affairs
- Salary: $155,500 (2010)
- Website: Official website

The assistant secretary of the treasury for legislative affairs is the head of the Office of Legislative Affairs in the United States Department of the Treasury. The role may be signed as deputy under secretary of the treasury for legislative affairs. The office "advises the Secretary on congressional relations matters in order to assist in the formulation of policy and determining the overall direction of the Department. [It] serves as the principal contact and coordinator for all Department interaction with the Congress and the Congressional Relations offices in the White House and other Departments and agencies."

The position was created on May 18, 1972 during the Nixon administration, with the original title of deputy under secretary for congressional relations. The title was changed to deputy under secretary for legislative affairs before the second officeholder was nominated.

According to U.S. statute, there are ten assistant secretaries of the treasury appointed by the president of the United States with the advice and consent of the United States Senate. The assistant secretary of the treasury for legislative affairs reports directly to the United States secretary of the treasury and the United States deputy secretary of the treasury.

== List of Assistant Secretaries of the Treasury for Legislative Affairs ==
Name	Assumed office	Left office	President appointed by	Secretary served under
James E. Smith	1972	1973	Richard Nixon	
William L. Gifford	1973	1974	Richard Nixon	
Frederick L. Webber	1974	September 1, 1975	Richard Nixon	
Harold F. Eberle, Jr.	1975	1977	Gerald Ford	William E. Simon
Gene E. Godley	1977	1981	Jimmy Carter	
W. Dennis Thomas	1981	1984	Ronald Reagan	
Bruce E. Thompson, Jr.	1984	1986	Ronald Reagan	
J. Michael Hudson	1986	1987	Ronald Reagan	
John K. Meagher	1987	1989	Ronald Reagan	
Bryce L. Harlow	1989	1991	George H. W. Bush	
Mary Catherine Sophos	1991	1993	George H. W. Bush	
Michael B. Levy	1993	1995	Bill Clinton	Lloyd Bentsen
Linda Lee Robertson	1995	2000	Bill Clinton	
Ruth Martha Thomas	2000	2001	Bill Clinton	
John Duncan	March 9, 2001	August 22, 2005	George W. Bush	Paul O'Neill, John W. Snow
Kevin Fromer	August 22, 2005	January 20, 2009	George W. Bush	John W. Snow, Henry Paulson
Kim N. Wallace	2009	2011	Barack Obama	Henry Paulson, Timothy Geithner
Alastair M. Fitzpayne	2012	2014	Barack Obama	Timothy Geithner, Jack Lew
Anne E. Wall	2015	2016	Barack Obama	Jack Lew
Drew Maloney	August 2017	June 11, 2018	Donald Trump	Steven Mnuchin
Brian McGuire	September 2019	April 2, 2020	Donald Trump	Steven Mnuchin
Jonathan Davidson	November 15, 2021	August 12, 2023	Joe Biden	Janet Yellen
Corey Tellez (Acting)	August 12, 2023	March 7, 2025	Joe Biden, Donald Trump	Janet Yellen, Scott Bessent
Jonathan Blum (Acting)	March 7, 2025	December 2025	Donald Trump	Scott Bessent
Derek Theurer	December 2025	July 3, 2026	Donald Trump	Scott Bessent
Mason Champion (Acting)	July 3, 2026	Present	Donald Trump	Scott Bessent

== See also ==
- Assistant Secretary of the Treasury
