= Qatar Anti-terrorism Financing and Money Laundering Law =

Qatar Anti- Terrorism Financing and Money Laundering Law also known as Law No. 20 of 2019 was passed on 12 September 2019, by Qari cabinet to combating money laundering and terrorism financing. It came into force on 1 February 2020 repealing Law No. 4 of 2010. According to the Qatari government, the law contains clauses that meet international standard requirements for combating money laundering and terrorism financing deficient in the law no. 28 of 2002 and law no. 4 of 2010. The law spells out legal requirements for financial transactions for businesses, non-profit organizations and money transfer services.

== Key provisions ==
The law applies to all financial institutions and designated non-financial organizations and professional bodies operating in the state of Qatar. It prescribes several penalties for violation including imprisonment and heavy financial sanctions. The law established National Counter-Terrorism Committee and empowered it to coordinate all relevant agencies responsible for implementing defences against terrorist activity.

Article 3 provides several key provisions against terrorist financing:

Whoever intentionally, by any means, directly or indirectly, with an unlawful intention provides or collects funds to be used, or while knowing that they are to be used, in whole or in part, in any of the following, shall be deemed to have committed a terrorist financing offence:

1. To carry out a terrorist act(s);
2. By an individual terrorist or by a terrorist organization, even in the absence of a link to a specific terrorist act or acts;
3. To finance the travel of individuals to a State other than their State of residence or nationality, for the purpose of the perpetration, planning, or preparation of, or participation in, terrorist acts or the providing or receiving of terrorist training;
4. To organize or direct others to commit or attempt to commit any of the acts stipulated in this Article.
5. To participate; collude; aid, abet, facilitate, counsel in, cooperate in, conspire to commit or attempt to commit any of the acts stipulated in this Article. The terrorism financing offence extends to any funds, whether from a legitimate or illegitimate source, regardless of whether the funds were actually used to commit or attempt to commit a terrorist act, or are linked to a specific terrorist act. The terrorism financing offence shall be deemed to have been committed, irrespective of whether the person charged with committing the offence is present in the same country or where the terrorist or terrorist organization is located or where the terrorist act was committed, or would be committed or in any other State. The terrorism financing offence shall be considered a predicate offence of money laundering.
