= Daniel Glaser =

American civil servant

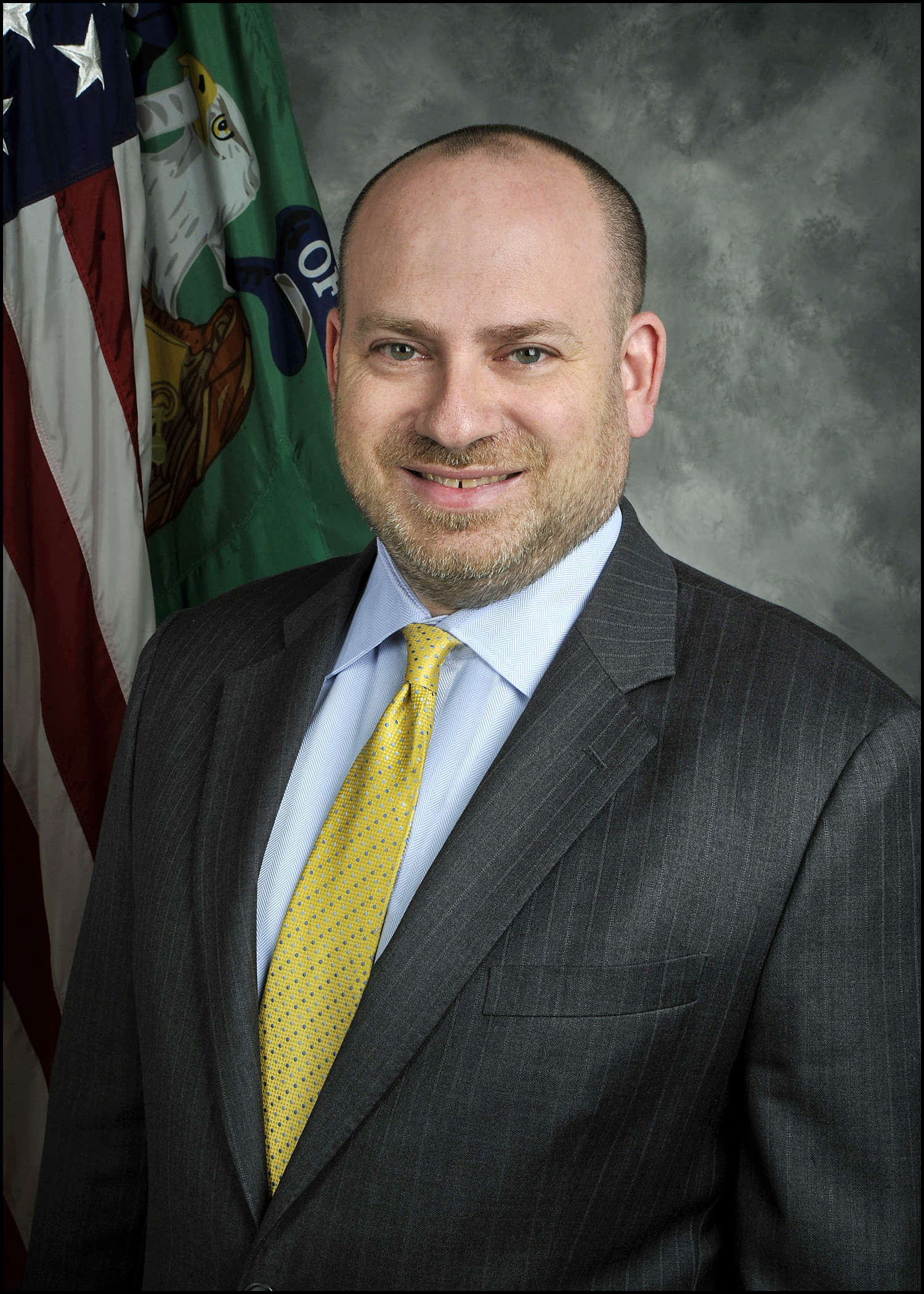

Assistant Secretary of the Treasury for Terrorist Financing
- In office June 30, 2011 – January 20, 2017
- President: Barack Obama
- Preceded by: David Cohen
- Succeeded by: Marshall Billingslea

Daniel L. Glaser is a former Assistant Secretary for Terrorist Financing at the United States Department of the Treasury. He served under Adam Szubin, the Under Secretary of the Treasury for Terrorism and Financial Intelligence in the Obama Administration. His work came into prominence as the result of a 2010 WikiLeaks document dump.

Glaser received a B.A. from the University of Michigan and a J.D. from Columbia Law School. Previously, he worked at Coudert Brothers and held various positions in the George W. Bush administration.

== Career ==
Glaser began his career as an associate at the Coudert Brothers law firm and was an attorney for the U.S. Secret Service. In 2003, he became the first Director of the Executive Office of Terrorist Financing and Financial Crimes in the Treasury Department, after which he was Senior Counsel for Financial Crimes in the General Counsel Office.

From 2001 to 2011, he was the Head of the US Delegation to the Financial Action Task Force (FATF) and he was FATF's International Cooperation Review Group co-chair from 2007 to 2017.
