= John Duncan (American government official) =

Under Secretary of the Treasury for Legislative Affairs

John M. Duncan

Assistant Secretary of the Treasury for Legislative Affairs
- In office 9 March 2001 – 22 August 2005
- Preceded by: Michael Levy
- Succeeded by: Kevin Fromer

Personal details
- Born: September 26, 1945 (age 81) Oak Park, Illinois, U.S.
- Education: University of Illinois at Urbana-Champaign; New School for Social Research

John M. Duncan (born September 26, 1945, in Oak Park, Illinois) is an American government official who had served as Assistant Secretary of the Treasury for Legislative Affairs at the U.S. Department of the Treasury.

President George W. Bush nominated Duncan to be Assistant Secretary of the Treasury for Legislative Affairs on February 28, 2001. Duncan served as Administrative Assistant to the former Senator William Roth as well as Majority Staff Director on the Senate Committee on Governmental Affairs between 1984 and 1985.

He is a native of Oak Park, Illinois, and is a veteran of the United States Army. He received his bachelor's degree from the University of Illinois and a master's degree from the Department of Urban Affairs and Policy Analysis at the New School for Social Research in New York.
