= Drew Maloney =

American lawyer (born 1969)

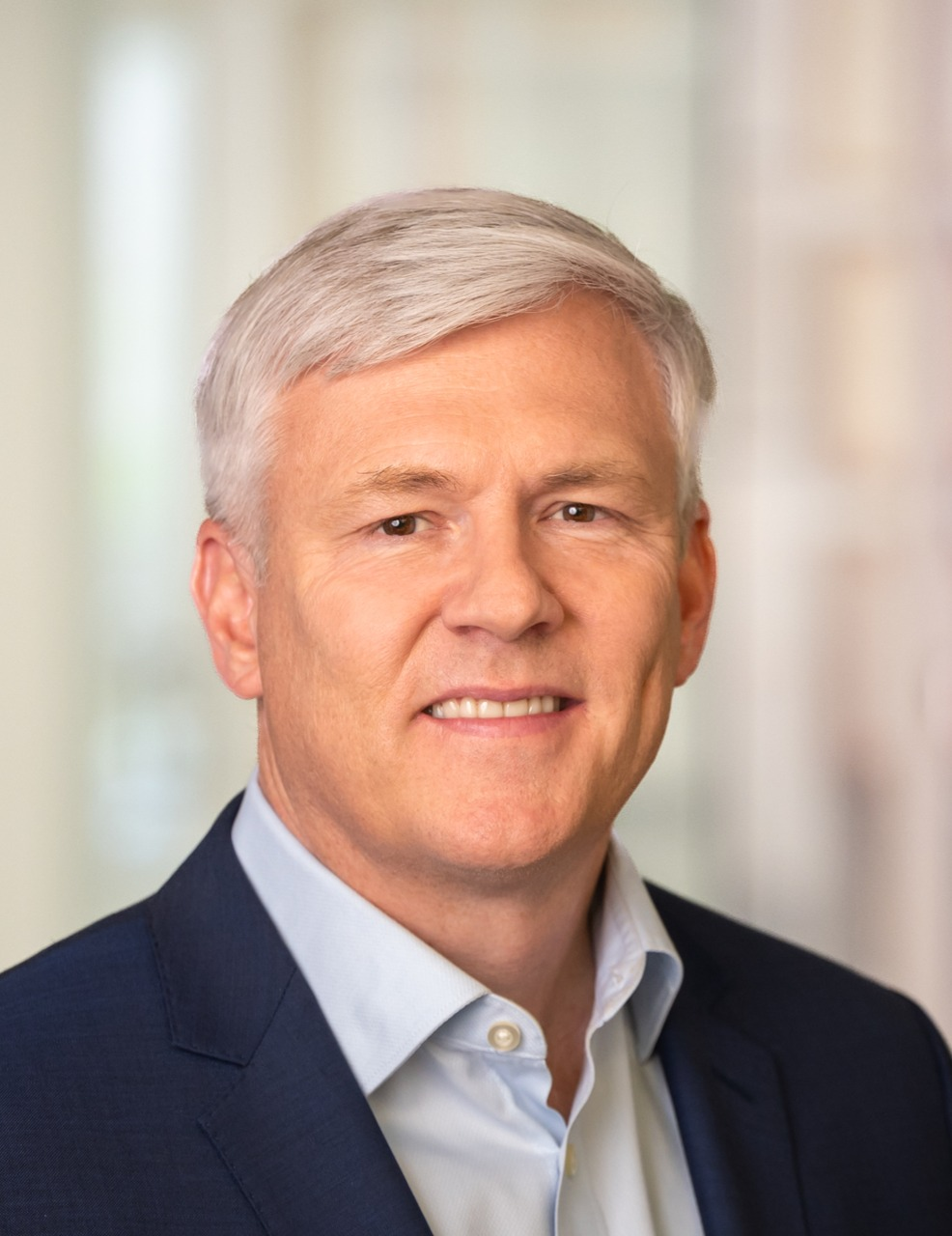

Assistant Secretary of the Treasury for Legislative Affairs
- In office August 2017 – June 2018
- President: Donald Trump
- Preceded by: Anne Wall
- Succeeded by: Brian McGuire

Personal details
- Born: Andrew Kerwin Maloney; March 30, 1969 (age 56) Washington, D.C., U.S.
- Party: Republican
- Spouse: Sabra Klein
- Children: 2
- Education: Randolph-Macon College (BA); Catholic University (JD)

Andrew Kerwin Maloney (born March 30, 1969) is a former senior U.S. government official and government affairs executive and the president and CEO of the Edison Electric Institute, an industry association that represents all of America's investor-owned electric companies. He previously served as president and CEO of the American Investment Council, an industry association for private-equity investors and firms. Prior to that, he served as Assistant Secretary of the Treasury for Legislative Affairs.

After graduating from Randolph-Macon College, Maloney worked in the Virginia General Assembly before beginning law school at Columbus School of Law at Catholic University of America in Washington, D.C. He then served on the staff of Members of the United States House of Representatives from 1997 to 2002, including then-House Majority Whip Tom DeLay.

Maloney was a lobbyist between 2002 and 2012, as CEO of Ogilvy Government Relations. As head of Mitt Romney's legislative affairs team, he advised Romney during his 2008 and 2012 unsuccessful presidential campaigns.

Prior to joining the Trump administration, Maloney was vice president of global government and external affairs for the Hess Corporation. Since July 2025 he has been the president of the Edison Electric Institute, representing investor-owned electric utilities.

== Early life ==
Maloney was raised on a farm in Rockingham County, Virginia, the son of Geri and Kerry Maloney. During college, Maloney worked as a summer intern for US Senator John Warner (R-VA). In 1991 he earned a bachelor's degree in political science from Randolph–Macon College. After graduating, Maloney ran a successful political campaign for GOP challenger Tommy Norment for the Virginia state senate before beginning law school at Columbus School of Law. While in law school, he spent a summer working for Laurence Whalen at the United States Tax Court.

== Political career ==
Between 1997 and 2002, Maloney worked as a staffer in the US House of Representatives. Maloney worked first as legislative counsel for Roger Wicker (R-MS) from 1997 to 1998.

While working as Representative Ed Bryant's (R-TN) legislative director from 1998 to 1999, Maloney was one of the aides and attorneys who interviewed Monica Lewinsky in the Mayflower Hotel's Presidential Suite during the Impeachment of Bill Clinton. Maloney aided Congressman Bryant in his role as a House Manager (prosecutor) in President Clinton's trial in the United States Senate.

Maloney served as House Majority Whip Tom DeLay's (R-TX) legislative director and chief of staff from 1999 until March 2002. In this role, Maloney handled issues related to energy.

During law school, Maloney joined one of Alaska's main lobbying firms, Robertson, Monagle & Eastaugh as a congressional liaison. Maloney spent two years at the firm before leaving in 1997 to serve on staff in the US House of Representatives. Maloney left the federal government to return to the lobbying industry, joining Republican lobbying firm The Federalist Group as a managing director in 2002. Maloney convened a meeting of former Tom DeLay staffers in the Washington area every six weeks.

After Republicans gained control of all branches of Texas government in 2003, Maloney was awarded a $15,000 per month contract by the Texas Office of State-Federal Relations (OSFR). It was noted in a press release by former Texas House Minority Leader Jim Dunnam that Maloney's personal campaign contributions increased from $250 in 2002 to $75,000 in 2003. All of Maloney's contributions were made to Republican candidates and committees, some of which were used to oust Democratic opponents within Texas.

“[Perry and his administration] were giving taxpayer money to these [lobbyists] and they were turning it around and giving it to defeat Texas congressmen,” Dunnam said.

The Federalist Group was renamed Ogilvy Government Relations after being acquired by Ogilvy PR Worldwide in 2005. Maloney was later promoted to CEO in 2009, upon completion of the 'earnout'. During this period, Maloney was employed concurrently by dozens of clients as a lobbyist, including the regional transmission organization PJM Interconnection (2002–2008); the Gas Technology Institute (2006); the New York Mercantile Exchange (2007); and Cash America International (2009).

In June 2012, Maloney left Ogilvy Government Relations to join the Republican National Committee as External Affairs Advisor during Mitt Romney's second unsuccessful presidential campaign. In March 2017, Maloney was nominated to serve as Assistant Secretary of Treasury for Legislative Affairs. Prior to assuming this role, he served as acting Deputy Under Secretary of the Treasury for Legislative Affairs under United States Secretary of the Treasury Steven Mnuchin. He was preceded as assistant secretary by Anne Elizabeth Wall. Also in 2017, he helped in the passage of the Tax Cuts and Job Act. Maloney left this position in June 2018.

== Energy industry ==
In December 2012, Maloney was appointed vice president of global government and external affairs for the Hess Corporation, a global producer of crude oil and natural gas. While at Hess, he was involved in legislative negotiations that contributed to a bipartisan agreement to repeal the U.S. crude oil export ban in 2015, a restriction originally established under the Energy Policy and Conservation Act. In July 2025, Maloney returned to the energy sector when he was appointed the president of the Edison Electric Institute, the organization representing investor-owned utilities, replacing former US Secretary of Energy Dan Brouillette, who left the EEI after serving fewer than 12 months, during alleged disagreements with member companies. Maloney’s job began at a difficult time for the industry as the US Congress had stopped a variety of clean energy tax credits and the price of electricity was rising rapidly, an issue that may influence the 2026 midterm elections.

== American Investment Council ==
On June 20, 2018, Maloney was named president and chief executive officer to the American Investment Council.

== Personal life ==
Maloney is married to Sabra Klein, a professor at the Johns Hopkins Bloomberg School of Public Health in Baltimore, Maryland. They have two children together. Maloney is a member of the board of trustees at the Woodrow Wilson International Center for Scholars and the Meridian International Center, and a former member at Randolph–Macon College. In 2010 he and his wife established the endowment the Klein-Maloney Women in Science Fellowship at Randolph Macon.
