= Francis Brooke (political advisor) =

American political advisor (born 1989/1990)

17th United States Deputy Secretary of the Treasury
- Incumbent
- Assumed office April 28, 2026 (Note: Acting: April 28, 2026 – September 22, 2026)
- President: Donald Trump
- Secretary: Scott Bessent
- Preceded by: Michael Faulkender

Deputy Director of the National Economic Council
- In office June 22, 2020 – January 20, 2021
- President: Donald Trump
- Preceded by: Andrew Olmem
- Succeeded by: Bharat Ramamurti

Personal details
- Born: Francis John Brooke Jr. 1989 or 1990 (age 36–37)
- Education: Northwestern University

Francis John Brooke Jr. (born 1989 or 1990) is an American political advisor who is serving as the United States Deputy Secretary of the Treasury.

== Early life and education ==
Francis John Brooke Jr. was born to Sharon and Francis John Brooke in 1989 or 1990. Brooke attended St. Albans School in Washington, D.C. He attended Northwestern University with a double major in political science and international relations, where he was a pitcher on the Wildcats baseball team.

== Career ==
=== Legislative aide (2012–2017) ===
Brooke began working in Washington, D.C., in 2012. That year, he joined the congressional baseball team, where he was known as "the kid" for his quick pitching. In 2013, Brooke became a legislative correspondent for Kentucky representative Andy Barr. He later became an aide to Barr. Brooke's work involved lifting a ban on crude exports, reaching an agreement on the Production Tax Credit, and negotiating the United States federal budget and the Fixing America's Surface Transportation Act. In 2016, Senate Majority Leader Mitch McConnell named Brooke to oversee energy, environment, agriculture, and transportation issues on his behalf.

=== Trump administration work (2017–2021) ===
In January 2017, Brooke became a domestic policy advisor for Vice President Mike Pence. In June, he witnessed the congressional baseball shooting. In November, Brooke moderated a discussion at the 2017 United Nations Climate Change Conference. In April 2018, Brooke became an energy advisor to President Donald Trump after Mike Catanzaro and David Banks left the White House. Brooke's perceived inexperience concerned some energy lobbyists. Brooke's position had transitioned to the National Economic Council by January 2019. That month, he began leading the Trump administration's energy policy, which sought to embolden the oil and gas industry amid competition from Russia. In June 2020, Brooke was named as the deputy director of the National Economic Council. In December, he was appointed to the board of the United States Merchant Marine Academy.

=== Further legislative work (2021–2025) ===
In 2021, Brooke began working for House Majority Leader Steve Scalise.

=== Department of the Treasury (2025–present) ===
In May 2025, Brooke became a counselor to Secretary of the Treasury Scott Bessent. He served as the acting Under Secretary of the Treasury for International Affairs and the Assistant Secretary of the Treasury for International Trade and Development. In April 2026, it was announced he was to be appointed as United States Deputy Secretary of the Treasury.

== Notes ==
Political offices
Preceded by Derek Theurer; Acting	United States Deputy Secretary of the Treasury; 2026–present	Incumbent
