= Sabra Klein =

Professor of molecular microbiology and immunology

Sabra Lynn Klein
- Education: Johns Hopkins University; University of Georgia; Randolph–Macon College
- Spouse: Drew Maloney
- Scientific career
- Workplaces: Johns Hopkins Bloomberg School of Public Health
- Thesis: Behavioral, physiological and evolutionary factors mediating sex and species differences in immune function among rodents (1998)

Sabra Klein is an American microbiologist who is a Professor of Molecular Microbiology and Immunology at the Johns Hopkins Bloomberg School of Public Health. Her research considers how sex and gender impact the immune system. During the COVID-19 pandemic, Klein investigated why men and women have different COVID-19 outcomes.

== Early life and education ==
Klein earned her bachelor's degree in psychology at Randolph–Macon College and graduated in 1992. She moved to the University of Georgia for her graduate studies, where she studied the impact of prenatal stress on the immune systems of rodents. She completed her doctoral research in behavioural neuroscience at Johns Hopkins Bloomberg School of Public Health, where she studied the sex and species differences in rodent immune function. Klein was a postdoctoral fellow in the laboratory of Gregory E. Glass.

== Research and career ==
Klein investigated the mechanisms that allow rodents to carry hantaviridae. To do this she monitored the immune response of Norway rats infected with Seoul orthohantavirus and showed that they have high numbers of regulatory T cells. By inactivating regulatory T cells and monitoring the presence of orthohantavirus in the rodents, Klein showed that hantaviridae viruses achieve persistence by exploiting these regulatory T cells. This allows rodents to maintain hantaviridae infections. Her research may help us better predict how hantaviridae can be transmitted to humans.

Whilst she started her academic career in neuroscience, Klein became more interested in immune system function. She is particularly interested in the differences between men and women's immune systems, and how they handle infectious diseases. Klein identified that the X chromosome was encoded with several genes that control the immune response. She believes that estrogen alters the response of immune cells, encouraging it to start making proteins and start or stop an inflammatory response. Whilst this stronger immune response can clear viruses faster in women, it can also cause immunopathology.

It is known that hormones impact the progression of influenza, and in 2009 Klein was commissioned by the World Health Organization to understand how sex, gender and pregnancy impact the outcomes of influenza infection. In 2018 Klein was awarded $8 million from the National Institutes of Health to better understand how biological sex and age impact the efficacy of influenza vaccinations. As part of this research, Klein created a mechanistic study into how genetic and hormonal factors impacted mouse immunity. She demonstrated that biological sex impacted the efficacy of vaccinations, showing that female mice who received the 2009 flu pandemic vaccine produced more antibodies than male mice. Her findings may indicate that men need a different dose or more frequent influenza vaccination boosts to women.

During the COVID-19 pandemic, Klein became interested in the differences between how men and women responded to Severe Acute Respiratory Syndrome Coronavirus 2 (SARS-Cov-2). It is well documented that men have worse COVID-19 outcomes to women. Klein has indicated that this biological sex dependent disparity in outcomes is common to many viral infections that impact the respiratory tract. Both she and Angela Rasmussen have argued that there are behavioural as well as biological reasons that men are so susceptible to COVID-19. In 2022, she was elected a Fellow of the American Association for the Advancement of Science.

== Selected publications ==
- Klein, Sabra L.; Flanagan, Katie L. (October 2016). "Sex differences in immune responses". Nature Reviews Immunology. 16 (10): 626–638. doi:10.1038/nri.2016.90. ISSN 1474-1733. PMID 27546235.
- Klein, S.L. (2000). "The effects of hormones on sex differences in infection: from genes to behavior". Neuroscience & Biobehavioral Reviews. 24 (6): 627–638. doi:10.1016/S0149-7634(00)00027-0. PMID 10940438. S2CID 31063828.
- Klein, S. L. (June 2004). "Hormonal and immunological mechanisms mediating sex differences in parasite infection". Parasite Immunology. 26 (6–7): 247–264. doi:10.1111/j.0141-9838.2004.00710.x. ISSN 0141-9838. PMID 15541029. S2CID 22258350.

== Personal life ==
Klein is married to Drew Maloney. In 2010 the couple created the Klein-Maloney Fellowship for Women in the Sciences.
