= Gary Shapley =

American investigator (born 1977)

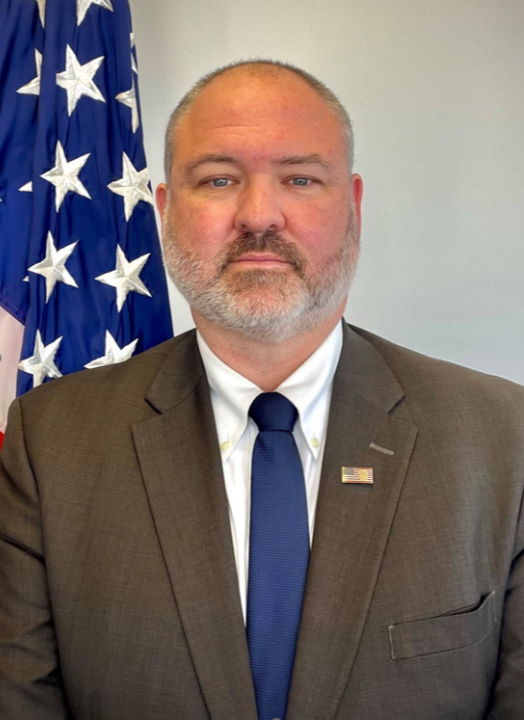
- Official portrait, 2025

Acting Commissioner of Internal Revenue
- In office April 16, 2025 – April 18, 2025
- President: Donald Trump
- Preceded by: Melanie Krause (acting)
- Succeeded by: Michael Faulkender (acting)

Personal details
- Born: Gary Allen Shapley Jr. December 1977 (age 48)
- Education: Binghamton University; University of Maryland, College Park (BS); University of Baltimore (MBA)

Gary Allen Shapley Jr. (born December 1977) is an American investigator who has served as the deputy chief of the IRS Criminal Investigation since November 2025. Shapley served as the acting commissioner of internal revenue from April 16 to April 18, 2025.

Shapley graduated from the University of Maryland with a bachelor's in accounting and business administration and from the University of Baltimore with a Master of Business Administration. He began working for the IRS Criminal Investigation in July 2009. Shapley supervised the agency's investigation into Hunter Biden, the son of president Joe Biden. He repeatedly testified to multiple House of Representatives committees on the inquiry, alleging that political bias had caused delays.

In March 2025, secretary of the treasury Scott Bessent promoted Shapley and his associate, Joseph Ziegler, to senior advisors to investigate the IRS. That month, he was named as deputy chief of the IRS Criminal Investigation. The following month, Trump named Shapley as the acting commissioner of internal revenue to succeed Melanie Krause over a dispute involving information on taxpayers sought by Immigration and Customs Enforcement. Three days later, Trump replaced Shapley with Michael Faulkender, the deputy secretary of the treasury, amid a struggle for control between Bessent and Elon Musk.

== Early life and education (1977–2003) ==
Gary Allen Shapley Jr. was born in December 1977. He graduated from Norwich High School. Shapley attended Binghamton University and later volunteered for the National Civilian Community Corps. He later graduated from the University of Maryland with a Bachelor of Science in accounting and business administration, and from the University of Baltimore with a Master of Business Administration.

== Career ==
=== IRS Criminal Investigation agent (2009–2025) ===
Shapley began working in the Internal Revenue Service's Criminal Investigation division in July 2009. He supervised the agency's investigation into Hunter Biden, the son of president Joe Biden. Shapley publicly alleged that the Department of Justice had "slow-walked" the investigation into the younger Biden in an interview with CBS News in May 2023. Michael Batdorf, the director of field operations at the Internal Revenue Service, claimed that he decided to remove Shapley and his team from the Biden case in December 2022. Batdorf cited an apparent statement from David C. Weiss, who oversaw the Biden investigation at the Department of Justice, claiming that Shapley could not "remain objective in the investigation"; notes from Shapley released by Politico in September revealed that he had concerns over Weiss beginning in October 2022.

That month, Biden sued the Internal Revenue Service over alleged violations of privacy, referencing Shapley and his associate, Joseph Ziegler; Biden dropped his lawsuit in April 2025. Shapley testified before the House Committee on Ways and Means about the investigation into Biden. His statements were made public in June 2023. Shapley's testimony was used by some congressional Republicans to counter Weiss's claim that he had independence in the special counsel investigation. Shapley testified before the House Committee on Oversight the following month alongside Ziegler, alleging that political bias caused Weiss's investigation to be slow-walked and delayed. He and Ziegler spoke with the Committee on Ways and Means in December, after the impeachment inquiry into Joe Biden began.

After Biden plead guilty to tax-related charges in September 2024, Shapley and Ziegler sued one of Biden's lawyers, Abbe Lowell, accusing him of defamation; a federal judge granted Lowell's motion to dismiss the lawsuit in October 2025, referring to specific comments that Lowell had made as "reasoned—albeit aggressive—positions". Shapley and Ziegler repeatedly alleged that the IRS removed them from the case for pursuing leads related to Joe Biden. In December, the Office of Special Counsel substantiated their claims.

=== Senior advisor and deputy chief of the IRS Criminal Investigation (March–November 2025) ===
In March 2025, secretary of the treasury Scott Bessent promoted Shapley and Ziegler to senior advisors to investigate the IRS, including alleged misconduct in the Biden case. Shapley was named as deputy chief of the IRS Criminal Investigation that month, a position that gave the Trump administration greater control over the agency.

== Acting Commissioner of Internal Revenue (April 2025) ==
On April 15, 2025, president Donald Trump named Shapley as the acting commissioner of internal revenue to succeed Melanie Krause, who resigned after administration officials sought to enjoin the Internal Revenue Service's data with Immigration and Customs Enforcement. On April 18, Trump replaced Shapley with Michael Faulkender, the deputy secretary of the treasury, as Elon Musk sought to install Shapley against Scott Bessent's will. According to The New York Times, Bessent was unaware that Shapley was named acting commissioner.

== Deputy Chief of the IRS Criminal Investigation (November 2025–present) ==
After his appointment as deputy chief of the IRS Criminal Investigation, Shapley told colleagues that he expected to become chief of the IRS Criminal Investigation after Trump's nominee for commissioner of internal revenue, Billy Long, was confirmed; Long was removed as commissioner in August in anticipation of an expected nomination to serve as the ambassador of the United States to Iceland, and he was succeeded by Scott Bessent. In October, The Wall Street Journal reported that Shapley was set to become chief of the IRS Criminal Investigation. Shapley's plans included forming a list of donors and organizations he believed investigators should examine, including the financier George Soros. Additionally, he intended to minimize the involvement of chief-counsel lawyers in conducting criminal inquiries. Guy Ficco remained the chief of the IRS Criminal Investigation through January 2026; according to The New York Times, Frank Bisignano, the Internal Revenue Service's chief executive, issued the decision and opted to retain Shapley as the deputy chief.

== Bibliography ==
In November 2025, Shapley and Joseph Ziegler published The Whistleblowers vs. The Big Guy: Two Special Agents, the Biden Crime Family, and a Corrupt Bureaucracy, covering their whistleblowing efforts.

Government offices
Preceded by Melanie Krause; Acting	Commissioner of Internal Revenue; Acting; 2025	Succeeded by Michael Faulkender; Acting
