= Assistant Secretary of the Treasury for Terrorist Financing =

Official in the U.S. Treasury Department

- Flag of an Assistant Secretary of the Treasury
- Incumbent; Jonathan Burke since April 14, 2026
- Office of Terrorism and Financial Intelligence
- Style: The Honorable
- Reports to: Under Secretary of the Treasury for Terrorism and Financial Intelligence
- Nominator: President of the United States
- Formation: 2004
- Website: Official website

The Assistant Secretary for Terrorist Financing is an official within the United States Treasury Department appointed by the President of the United States, tasked with formulating, coordinating, and executing the U.S. government's counterterrorism financing and anti-money laundering strategies, as well as engaging in financial diplomacy to disrupt the financing of illicit actors and U.S. national security threats. This official reports to the Under Secretary of the Treasury for Terrorism and Financial Intelligence and oversees the Office of Terrorist Financing and Financial Crimes (TFFC).

Established by the U.S. Congress in 2004 amid the evolving post-9/11 security landscape, the office provides strategic and policy planning functions aimed at disrupting the financing of a wide range of U.S. national security and illicit finance threats, including terrorist groups, drug traffickers, transnational criminals, cybercriminals, nuclear proliferators, and corrupt actors. The Assistant Secretary for Terrorist Financing is involved in safeguarding U.S. and international financial systems against abuse by illicit actors, engaging with foreign governments and the private sector to promote coordinated action, and leading foreign engagement on national security and illicit finance issues on behalf of the Treasury Department.

== Establishment and responsibilities ==
The office of Assistant Secretary for Terrorist Financing is statutorily responsible for "formulating and coordinating the counter terrorist financing and anti-money laundering efforts of the Department of the Treasury". It is subordinate to that of the Under Secretary of the Treasury for Terrorism and Financial Intelligence and is appointed by the President of the United States, subject to the approval of the U.S. Senate. The office of Assistant Secretary for Terrorist Financing was established by the United States Congress in 2004.

The Assistant Secretary for Terrorist Financing oversees the Office of Terrorist Financing and Financial Crimes (TFFC), which provides policy planning, foreign engagement, and coordination functions across the Office of Terrorism and Financial Intelligence, including Treasury's Office of Foreign Assets Control, Office of Intelligence and Analysis, and Financial Crimes Enforcement Network. TFFC also leads the U.S. delegation to the Financial Action Task Force. Since its founding, TFFC has played a central role in the U.S. Treasury Department's dismantling of terrorist financing networks, imposition of financial pressure on Iran, and sanctions response to Russia's 2022 invasion of Ukraine.

== Previous officeholders ==
Picture	Name	Term	Notes
	Jonathan Burke	2026 – Present	
	Anna Morris (Acting)	2024–2026	
	Elizabeth Rosenberg	2022–2024	Rosenberg previously worked as a director of the energy, economics and security program at the Center for a New American Security, a Washington think tank, and as a senior adviser to the Undersecretary of the Treasury for Terrorism and Financial Intelligence between 2009 and 2013.
	Marshall Billingslea	2017–2021	
	Daniel Glaser	2011–2017	Glaser served as Deputy Assistant Secretary for Terrorist Financing from 2004 to 2011.
	David Cohen	2009–2011	Prior to accepting appointment as Assistant Secretary for Terrorist Financing, Cohen worked as an attorney at Wilmer Cutler Pickering Hale and Dorr. He left the post to accept an appointment as Under Secretary of the Treasury for Terrorism and Financial Intelligence. In 2015 he was appointed deputy director of the Central Intelligence Agency.
	Pat O'Brien	2005–2009	O'Brien previously served as counsel to the Director of the Federal Bureau of Investigation. After leaving office he went to work for Booz Allen Hamilton and sat on the board of advisors of the Center on Sanctions and Illicit Finance at the Foundation for Defense of Democracies.
	Juan Carlos Zarate	2004–2005	In 2014, Zarate accepted appointment to the board that oversees the Vatican's Institute for the Works of Religion, a move announced by Cardinal Pell of the Vatican Finance Ministry as part of Pope Francis I's efforts to clean up the finances of the Vatican. From 1988 to 1989 he served one term as student body president of Mater Dei High School in Santa Ana, California. He was selected for the Youth Inaugural Conference which was invited to that year's inauguration of George H. W. Bush.

== See also ==
- Terrorism
- Assistant Secretary of the Treasury
