= Edison Electric Institute =

American trade group

- Formation: 1933
- Headquarters: 701 Pennsylvania Avenue, N.W. Washington, D.C. 20004-2696
- Location: 38°53′39.9″N 77°1′20.4″W
- Chair: Calvin Butler
- President: Drew Maloney
- Website: www.eei.org

The Edison Electric Institute (EEI) is an industry association that represents all U.S. investor-owned electric companies.

In its official communications, EEI mostly cast doubt on climate change in the 1990s. In the 2000s, EEI no longer cast doubt on climate change. However, in its official communications, the organization called for a delay in transitioning towards cleaner sources of energy. The organization heavily promoted "clean coal" as a cleaner source of energy (mentioning "clean coal" as much as all other carbon-free technologies combined). Since 2015, EEI's official communications have acknowledged the scientific consensus on climate change, although its chairman in 2017 said he did not agree with the scientific consensus.

The industry association continues to lobby against critical climate-related regulations and maintains that fossil fuels, particularly fossil gas, have a prominent role to play in the power sector. Across the 2022-2024 time period, EEI strategically opposed (including via legal challenge) the ambition of the Biden administration's proposed carbon standards to address greenhouse gas (GHG) emissions from fossil fuel-fired power plants. In August 2025, EEI endorsed the Trump administration's proposed repeal of these carbon standards, stating that the power sector "needs the ability to continue adding capacity of all types to ensure reliable, affordable electricity."

== Leadership ==
EEI's current president and CEO is Drew Maloney, who succeeded interim President and CEO Pat Vincent-Collawn in April 2025. Drew Maloney is head of the American Investment Council and served as Assistant Secretary of the Treasury during President Trump's first term. He also acted as an advisor in Mitt Romney’s losing presidential campaign in 2012 and was formerly an aide to Representative Tom DeLay (R – Texas, retired). In 2025, Emily Schillinger was named chief communications officer; Kiel Weaver became chief advocacy officer; and Rachael Marsh was chief legal officer.

Exelon's CEO Calvin Butler is serving as EEI Chair for the 2025-2026 cycle.

Former Secretary of Energy Dan Brouillette was president and CEO of the EEI across the 2023-2024 time period, stepping down in October 2024. The choice of Brouillette as president was criticized by the environmental group Evergreen Action. Brouillette's term as head of EEI was marked by public statements in favor of pro-liquified natural gas (LNG) and against electric vehicles.

== Membership ==
Members of the Edison Electric Institute are investor-owned utility companies and are mostly publicly-traded companies that supply power and electricity to businesses and consumers. In January 2026 EEI provided a list of company members on their website, as well as Strategic Partners and Associate Members. Members whose names are not asterisked are parent/holding companies; companies who are asterisked are regulated, operating utilities whose owner are directly above them.

=== Membership ===
January 2026

AES Corporation

- AES Indiana
- AES Ohio

ALLETE

- Minnesota Power
- Superior Water, Light and Power

Alliant Energy

Ameren Corporation

- Ameren Illinois
- Ameren Missouri

American Electric Power

- AEP Ohio
- AEP Texas
- Appalachian Power Company
- Indiana Michigan Company
- Kentucky Power Company
- Public Service Company of Oklahoma
- Southwestern Electric Power Company

American Transmission Company

Avangrid (Iberdrola)

- Central Maine Power
- New York State Electric & Gas
- Rochester Gas & Electric
- The United Illuminating Company

Avista Corporation

- Avista Utilities
- Alaska Electric Light and Power Company

Berkshire Hathaway Energy

- MidAmerican Energy Company
- NV Energy
- Pacificorp
- Pacific Power
- Rocky Mountain Power

Black Hills Corporation

- Black Hills Energy

Cleco Corporate Holdings

CMS Energy

- Centerpoint Energy

Central Hudson Gas & Electric Corp.

- Consumers Energy

Consolidated Edison

- Consolidated Edison Co of New York
- Orange and Rockland Utilities

Dominion Energy

DTE Energy

Duke Energy

Duquesne Light Company

Edison International

- Southern California Edison

El Paso Electric

Entergy Corporation

- Entergy Arkansas
- Entergy Louisiana
- Entergy Mississippi
- Entergy New Orleans
- Entergy Texas

Evergy

Eversource Energy

Exelon Corporation

- Atlantic City Electric
- BGE
- ComEd
- Delmarva Power
- PECO
- Pepco

FirstEnergy Corp.

- Ohio Edison
- The Illuminating Company
- Jersey Central Power & Light
- Met-Ed
- Mon Power
- Penelec
- Penn Power
- Potomac Edison
- Toledo Edison
- West Penn Power

Florida Public Utilities (CPK)

Green Mountain Power

Hawaiian Electric Industries

- Hawaiian Electric Company

IDACORP

- Idaho Power

ITC Holdings Corp.

- ITC Great Plains
- ITC Michigan
- ITC Midwest

Liberty Utilities (Algonquin)

MDU Resources Group

- Montana-Dakota Utilities Company

MGE Energy

- Madison Gas and Electric Company

Mt. Carmel Public Utility Company

National Grid NextEra Energy

- Florida Power & Light Company

NiSource

- Northern Indiana Public Service Co

NorthWestern Energy

OGE Energy Corporation

- Oklahoma Gas & Electric Company

Ohio Valley Electric Corporation

Oncor

Otter Tail Corporation

- Otter Tail Power Company

PG&E Corporation

- Pacific Gas & Electric

Pinnacle West Capital Corp

- Arizona Public Service Company

Portland General Electric

PPL Corporation

- PPL Electric Utilities
- LG&E and KU Energy
- Rhode Island Energy

Public Service Enterprise Group

- Public Service Electric & Gas
- PSEG Long Island

Puget Sound Energy

San Diego Gas & Electric Company

Sharyland Utilities

Southern Company

- Alabama Power Company
- Georgia Power Company
- Mississippi Power Company

Tampa Electric (Emera) TXNM Energy

- PNM
- TNMP

UGI Corporation

- UGI Utilities

Unitil Corporation UNS Energy Corporation

- Tucson Electric Power
- UniSource Energy Services

Vermont Electric Power Company

Versant Power

WEC Energy Group

- We Energies
- Wisconsin Public Service
- Upper Michigan Energy Resources
- Xcel Energy

== Issues ==
=== Opposition to emissions mitigation regulations ===
EEI continues to strategically oppose U.S. federal regulations related to climate, most prominently on the Biden administration's power plant carbon standards.

==== Positioning on federal regulation of power plant emissions ====
Across the 2022-2024 time period, the industry group used a variety of tactics to weaken the ambition of the Biden administration's power plant carbon standards, primarily via public messaging and comments submitted to the U.S. Environmental Protection Agency and other federal regulators. The industry group also legally challenged the standards: when the Biden administration announced the finalized emissions rules for existing coal- and new gas-fired power plants in April 2024, EEI submitted a petition for review in May 2024.

In August 2025, EEI submitted comments endorsing the Trump administration's proposal to repeal the standards finalized under Biden.

==== Positioning on the National Environmental Policy Act ====
Across 2025-2026, EEI has been advocating for deregulatory permitting reform that takes aim at the National Environmental Policy Act (NEPA), which governs the permitting process for federal actions, such as the assessment of proposed energy projects. This advocacy includes letters urging Congress to support the SPEED Act, which proposes to significantly weaken the rigor and scope of NEPA.

=== 2017 tax cut ===
The Tax Cuts and Jobs Act, the largest tax overhaul in 30 years, was passed by Congress and signed by President Trump at the end of 2017. The legislation had several provisions that benefit the electric industry: maintaining the federal income tax deduction for interest expense for regulated electric companies; maintaining the federal income tax deduction for state and local taxes; and providing for the “continuation of normalization, including addressing excess deferred taxes resulting from a reduction in the tax rate.”

=== Electric vehicles ===
On June 8, 2015, U.S. Energy Secretary Ernest Moniz and the Edison Electric Institute signed a memorandum of understanding (MOU) regarding plug-in electric vehicles (PEVs). The MOU sets up a collaboration between the government and EEI to make PEVs, by the year 2022, as affordable as regular gas-powered vehicles were in 2012. The Department of Energy runs an initiative called the "EV Everywhere Grand Challenge", which put forth the 2022 affordability goal. The program coincides with the popularity of electric vehicle sales, which have increased by 128 percent between 2012 and 2014.

EEI runs a program called the Employee PEV Engagement Initiative. The goal is to "increase electric vehicle readiness, especially in the workplace," according to the Department of Energy. According to the Department of Energy, Kate Brandt, Federal Chief Sustainability Officer at the White House Council on Environmental Quality, said, "Today's Memorandum of Understanding with the nation's electric power industry allows the Department of Energy to tap into the experience and scale of an industry that is truly leading the way in moving the electric vehicle market forward."

In pursuing the initiative, EEI and the DOE will work with other federal agencies including Department of Transportation (DOT), General Services Administration (GSA), Council on Environmental Quality (CEQ), and the White House.

=== Grid security ===
The energy grid is a complex, interconnected network of generation, transmission, distribution, control, and communication technologies. Any of these can be damaged by either natural events or malicious attacks such as cyber or physical attacks. The electric power industry has engaged with a series of initiatives meant to protect the energy grid from these threats. The industry collaborates with the National Institute of Standards and Technology, the North American Electric Reliability Corporation, and federal intelligence and law enforcement agencies.

On September 20, 2018, EEI announced that it supported the Trump Administration's unveiled National Cyber Strategy. The protection of critical infrastructure such as the electric grid were included in the National Cyber Strategy.

=== Hurricane Maria ===
After Hurricane Maria hit the island of Puerto Rico in 2017, the federal government invested $3.2 billion into restoring the island's power grid. The Edison Electric Institute deployed Carlos D. Torres, a retired vice president at Consolidated Edison, to Puerto Rico to coordinate storm rebuilding of the power grid. Subsequently, Torres was appointed by Gov. Ricardo Rossello as coordinator for storm restoration.

=== Unmanned aircraft ===
EEI supports the use of drones (unmanned aircraft systems, or UAS) by electric power companies to maintain electric grids and restore downed service. In July 2016, Congress passed legislation (H.R. 636) that "includes provisions supporting electric power companies utilizing unmanned aircraft systems (UAS) for energy grid maintenance and service restoration."

=== Artificial intelligence power requirements ===
Between 2025 and 2029, U.S. electric utilities are projected to spend $1.1 trillion (U.S) on new capital projects to meet surging electricity demand, according to the EEI’s 2024 Financial Review. In 2024 alone, utilities brought 52 gigawatts of new generation online—an 11% increase from the prior year—while grid-scale energy-storage capacity expanded by 54%.

Some technology companies, unable to wait for the grid to catch up, are now building their own generating stations—a role reversal deemed improbable a few years ago – something most tech companies are not happy to do. Most tech executives would rather buy power than produce it. A data center can use as much electricity as 1,000 Walmarts annually; AI searches use 10x the power of a Google search. Data centers used less than 2% of total U.S. power before 2020, but by 2028 could use as much as 12%.

This power need is most dramatic in the U.S. which should remain the world’s largest user of data centers through the decade. AI’s power problem stems from two converging trends. First, energy intensity—the electricity required for each computation—rises for every generation of AI compared with traditional data processing. Second, the scale of computation itself has increased: training and running large language models demand orders of magnitude more server capacity than conventional workloads.

=== Renewable energy ===
==== Partnership with pro-environment group ====
In February 2018, EEI and the Natural Resources Defense Council (NRDC), a non-profit international environmental advocacy group, released a joint statement outlining 21 policy priorities on which both organizations would work together to advance clean energy. Both organizations said the recommendations are designed to “accelerate the clean energy transition; promote investment in smarter energy infrastructure, while ensuring affordable and reliable electricity; and facilitate collaboratively developed rate design and regulatory reforms that accommodate rapid technology change and evolving customer expectations.”

==== Advocacy for changes to homeowner solar panel policies ====
Between 2011 and 2017, rooftop solar panel installations had "explosive growth—as much as 900 percent by one estimate." But by 2017, the growth stopped. Saturation in certain markets, such as California, and financial problems at several of the top solar panel makers are the main factors that caused the decline in growth. But, according to the New York Times, "the decline has also coincided with a concerted and well-funded lobbying campaign by traditional utilities, which have been working in state capitals across the country to reverse incentives for homeowners to install solar panels." EEI has played a central role in a national U.S. campaign to reduce renewable energy incentives. However, the EEI has been successful in rolling back state-level incentives for rooftop solar energy.

==== Net metering ====
Net metering describes a system connected to homeowner-produced solar energy. Under net metering rules in many states, private solar customers can sell excess power they produce back to the grid at what is known as the "retail price", which is more than the utilities pay for the energy itself from energy producers. Utilities argue that this practice is unfair to homeowners who do not want or cannot afford their own solar panels.

EEI’s position on traditional net energy metering (NEM) policies is as follows: Net metering typically allows customers with distributed generation (DER), such as rooftop solar, to receive credit at the full retail rate for excess electricity they export to the grid. EEI says that retail-rate net metering can create financial impacts for utilities and non-participating ratepayers by reducing utility revenue and shifting fixed grid costs to customers without distributed generation. In public remarks and policy filings, and has described net metering as a “regressive and poor public policy tool,” asserting that NEM policies may not align with cost-based compensation for utility services and could contribute to revenue erosion for electric companies. EEI supports reduced compensation for simple energy exports with expanded incentives for DER configurations and behaviors that support grid needs, such as solar-plus-storage, demand response, time-of-use pricing, and managed charging. Rather than opposing DER growth, EEI positions utilities as facilitators of DER integration through updated rate designs, distribution system planning, and aggregation programs that enhance resilience, and load flexibility. Successor tariffs to traditional net metering should balance customer adoption with fairness to non-participating customers, while encouraging DER deployments that contribute to system reliability, decarbonization goals, and efficient grid operation.

Critics of EEI have characterized the association’s actions as part of broader utility efforts to roll back or limit the expansion of net metering incentives, including involvement in model legislation and public campaigns targeting rooftop solar policies.

==== ESG reporting template ====
In August 2018, EEI announced that it was launching an environmental, social, governance, and sustainability-related (ESG/sustainability) reporting template to help both consumers and the financial sector, the latter with "more uniform and consistent ESG/sustainability data and information." EEI had launched a similar program as a pilot program in 2017. The template is the first of its kind, being "the first and only industry-focused and investor-driven ESG reporting framework."

== Foundation ==
The Edison Electric Institute runs the Edison Electric Institute for Electric Innovation foundation, a 501(c)(3) charitable organization. The foundation's main activities are research, holding conferences, giving grants, and outreach to outside parties and organizations. The foundation's three main goals are to educate the public about how electric power is produced, delivered, and used; help make the environment clean and safe; and to improve the quality of life for all people. The governing structure of the foundation is a board of directors composed of electric industry CEOs.
