= Isabel Marie Keenan Patelunas =

American intelligence official

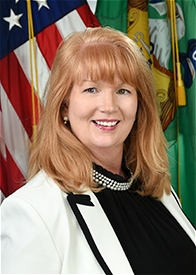

Assistant Secretary of the Treasury for Intelligence and Analysis
- In office September 17, 2018 – January 20, 2021
- President: Donald Trump
- Preceded by: Leslie Ireland
- Succeeded by: Shannon Corless

Personal details
- Education: University of Notre Dame; University of Maryland

Isabel Marie Keenan Patelunas is an American government official. She is a member of the Senior Intelligence Service at the Central Intelligence Agency, where she has worked since 1989. Patelunas has served as Director of the President's Daily Brief staff, Deputy Director of the C.I.A.'s Office of Middle East and North Africa Analysis, and as Director of the Advanced Analysis Training Program. She has also held roles with the National Counterproliferation Center and the Weapons Intelligence, Nonproliferation, and Arms Control Center.

In June 2017, Patelunas was nominated by President Donald Trump to serve as Assistant Secretary for Intelligence and Analysis at the United States Department of the Treasury.
