= COVID-19 Congressional Oversight Commission =

US oversight body

The COVID-19 Congressional Oversight Commission (COC) is an oversight body in the United States created by the CARES Act. They will report to Congress every 30 days on how the Department of the Treasury and the Federal Reserve Board manage the funds until September 30, 2025. These reports will assess:

- The economic impact the disbursements have on the populace, financial markets, and financial institutions
- The transparency of how the money is used
- The long-term costs and benefits to taxpayers taking on loans made by the legislation

== Membership ==
The COC has a similar composition and remit as the TARP Congressional Oversight Panel. It will have five members, one member each appointed by the House Speaker (Nancy Pelosi), House Minority Leader (Kevin McCarthy), Senate Majority Leader (Mitch McConnell), Senate Minority Leader (Chuck Schumer), and the chair chosen jointly by the House Speaker and Senate Majority Leader. They need not be members of Congress. As of 18 May 2020, the chair remained vacant, as the House Speaker and Senate Majority Leader had not yet agreed. The current membership is:

=== 117th Congress ===
	Majority	Minority
Senate members	Bharat Ramamurti (D) (until January 20, 2021); Vacant (from January 20, 2021)	Sen. Pat Toomey (R-PA)
House members	Donna Shalala (D-FL)	Rep. French Hill (R-AR)
Chair	Vacant	

=== 116th Congress ===
	Majority	Minority
Senate members	Sen. Pat Toomey (R-PA)	Bharat Ramamurti (D)
House members	Rep. Donna Shalala (D)	Rep. French Hill (R-AR)
Chair	Vacant	

== Reports ==
The committee released its first report on 18 May 2020. It describes how the $500 billion Treasury Department fund will function.

== See also ==
- Pandemic Response Accountability Committee
- Special Inspector General for Pandemic Recovery
- United States House Select Subcommittee on the Coronavirus Crisis
