= United States House Select Subcommittee on the Coronavirus Pandemic =

Select subcommittee of House Oversight Committee
- Defunct United States House of Representatives; 116th Congress

History
- Formed: April 23, 2020
- Disbanded: January 3, 2025
- Formerly known as: Select Subcommittee on the Coronavirus Crisis

Jurisdiction
- Purpose: To investigate the origins of COVID-19, gain-of-function research, coronavirus-related government spending, and mask and vaccine mandates.

The United States House Select Subcommittee on the Coronavirus Pandemic, formerly the Select Subcommittee on the Coronavirus Crisis, was a bipartisan United States House of Representatives select subcommittee that was created to provide congressional oversight of the Trump administration's response to the COVID-19 pandemic in the United States. The Select Subcommittee was established under H.Res.935 during the 116th Congress. Speaker Nancy Pelosi announced on April 2, 2020, that the committee would oversee the $2.2 trillion economic stimulus/rescue legislation (the Coronavirus Aid, Relief, and Economic Security Act) enacted by Congress. The Act created a $500 billion bailout fund for U.S. industry and is the largest economic emergency legislation in U.S. history. It was established as a special investigatory subcommittee under the House Oversight Committee.

Pelosi stated in her announcement that the committee would be chaired by House Majority Whip Jim Clyburn, aided by a staff of experts, and it would have subpoena power and a $2,000,000 budget. Pelosi charged the committee with preventing waste, profiteering, and price gouging, and seeking to ensure that responses to the pandemic are based on science. She described the committee as a mechanism for an after-action review.

The committee's mandate is analogous to that of the Truman Committee in the 1940s, which investigated waste and fraud in defense spending.

On April 23, 2020, the House officially voted 212–182 along party lines, to approve the committee's creation.

After Republicans gained a majority of the House of Representatives at the start of the 118th Congress, the House voted to continue the committee, now dubbed Select Subcommittee on the Coronavirus Pandemic, was approved as part of the House's rules package on January 9, 2023, by a 220–213 vote. The purpose of the committee was changed to investigate the origins of COVID-19, gain-of-function research, coronavirus-related government spending, and mask and vaccine mandates.

On January 24, 2023, Speaker Kevin McCarthy announced that the subcommittee would be chaired by Representative Brad Wenstrup.

The committee released its final report on December 2, 2024. In the 520-page report, the House Select Subcommittee on the Coronavirus Pandemic concludes that the coronavirus "most likely emerged from a laboratory in Wuhan, China," citing factors like biological characteristics of the virus and illnesses among researchers at the Wuhan Institute of Virology in fall 2019. The subcommittee was dissolved by Chairman of the House Oversight Committee James Comer at the end of the 118th Congress.

The report also concludes that social distancing and mask mandates were not based on hard science and "prolonged lockdowns caused immeasurable harm to not only the American economy, but also to the mental and physical health of Americans, with a particularly negative effect on younger citizens."

== Members, 118th Congress ==
Majority	Minority
Brad Wenstrup, Ohio, Chair; Nicole Malliotakis, New York; Mariannette Miller-Meeks, Iowa; Marjorie Taylor Greene, Georgia; Debbie Lesko, Arizona; Michael Cloud, Texas; John Joyce, Pennsylvania; Ronny Jackson, Texas; Rich McCormick, Georgia	Raul Ruiz, California, Ranking Member; Debbie Dingell, Michigan; Kweisi Mfume, Maryland; Deborah Ross, North Carolina; Robert Garcia, California; Ami Bera, California; Jill Tokuda, Hawaii
Ex officio
James Comer, Kentucky	Jamie Raskin, Maryland

== Historical membership rosters ==
=== 117th Congress ===
Members from the 117th Congress
Majority	Minority
Jim Clyburn, South Carolina, Chair; Maxine Waters, California; Carolyn Maloney, New York; Nydia Velázquez, New York; Bill Foster, Illinois; Jamie Raskin, Maryland; Raja Krishnamoorthi, Illinois	Steve Scalise, Louisiana, Ranking Member; Jim Jordan, Ohio; Mark Green, Tennessee; Nicole Malliotakis, New York; Mariannette Miller-Meeks, Iowa

== See also ==
- COVID-19 Congressional Oversight Commission
- Pandemic Response Accountability Committee
- Special Inspector General for Pandemic Recovery
