= Melanie Krause =

American government official

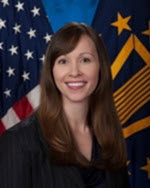

Commissioner of Internal Revenue
- Acting; February 28, 2025 – April 16, 2025
- President: Donald Trump
- Preceded by: Douglas O'Donnell (acting)
- Succeeded by: Gary Shapley (acting)

Personal details
- Born: 1985 or 1986 (age 40–41)
- Education: University of Wisconsin–Madison (BS, MS, PhD)

Melanie Krause is an American government official who served as acting Commissioner of Internal Revenue from February to April 2025.

== Early life and education ==
Krause attended the University of Wisconsin–Madison, and received three degrees, including a Ph.D. in nursing in 2010. Her first job out of school was as a registered nurse at an assisted living facility.

== Career ==
Krause started her career in the government as an auditor of healthcare for the GAO, and then spent seven years working at the United States Department of Veterans Affairs. In 2018 she became assistant inspector general for the Veterans Affairs Office; at age 32 this made her the agency's fourth-ever female senior executive. Within three years she had a staff of 140, whose functions included overseeing over 30,000 contracts per year and detecting fraud, waste and abuse.

Krause began with the Internal Revenue Service (IRS) in 2021 as chief data and analytics officer. In 2022 she became deputy commissioner for services and enforcement, and in 2024 she moved up to become chief operating officer. In this position she was in charge of day-day operations with over 100,000 personnel in over 500 locations. On February 25, 2025 she was appointed acting commissioner of the IRS.

Krause resigned less than two months later on April 8, 2025. She did so in protest over a data sharing agreement between the IRS and U.S. Immigration and Customs Enforcement (ICE), allowing disclosure of confidential immigrant tax information. This agreement was signed by Treasury Secretary Scott Bessent and Homeland Security Secretary Kristi Noem. Krause was left out of the discussions and had no input. She learned about the agreement after the information had been sent to Fox News.

=== Controversy over IRS–DHS data sharing ===
In October 2026, journalist Michael Lewis published an account of Krause's tenure as acting IRS commissioner in his book Blockers: Rebels in the Deep State and in an edited extract published by The Guardian. According to Lewis, based principally on interviews with former IRS chief privacy officer Kathleen Walters, Krause instructed IRS staff to explore providing the Department of Homeland Security (DHS) with taxpayer information that could be used to locate undocumented immigrants. Lewis reported that, shortly after Krause became acting commissioner in February 2025, IRS officials received a DHS request for addresses associated with approximately 700,000 people believed by the administration to be undocumented. Walters told Lewis that she considered the request unlawful and that Krause had circumvented her by directing IRS staff to consider how the data could be provided. Lewis further reported that IRS lawyers subsequently worked on a proposed data-sharing agreement with DHS at Krause's direction and without Walters or the lawyers' supervisors being informed.

Lewis also reported allegations concerning Krause's role in the termination of IRS human-resources chief Traci DiMartini. According to Walters, DOGE official Gavin Kliger sought DiMartini's removal after she refused to sign an email falsely stating that thousands of probationary IRS employees had been terminated for poor performance, and Kliger subsequently asked Krause to fire her. Lewis reported that Krause did so. Lewis characterized Krause's appointment as acting commissioner as occurring after her predecessor, Doug O'Donnell, refused to carry out the same proposed termination process.

Krause disputed these accounts. In a statement provided to The Guardian, she said that she had "did my job with integrity, honesty, and transparency" and denied instructing anyone to provide taxpayer information to DHS or directing lawyers to work on a data-sharing agreement. She also denied that DiMartini's refusal to sign the termination email was the reason for her dismissal. Krause said that she had never agreed to or wanted IRS data disclosed to DHS and that she resigned for personal reasons after learning that the Treasury Department had signed a data-sharing agreement with DHS. The Washington Post had separately reported in April 2025 that Krause was leaving the IRS after Treasury and DHS reached an agreement concerning access to taxpayer information, although accounts differed over the extent of Krause's involvement in the negotiations.

== Personal life ==
Krause acknowledged that she "moved up so quickly" in the government workplace. She opined that the vigor of her nursing training enabled her to "get up to speed quickly and hit the ground running" and "to climb the ranks in the federal government.” She has maintained her license as a registered nurse.

Government offices
Preceded by Douglas O'Donnell; Acting	Commissioner of Internal Revenue; Acting; 2025	Succeeded by Gary Shapley; Acting
