= Proliferation financing =

Act of providing funds for weapons

Proliferation financing refers to the act of providing funds or assisting with financial transactions that support the development, acquisition, or spread of nuclear, chemical, biological, or radiological weapons. These activities present great risk to global security. They are subject to international controls and monitoring.

Efforts to combat proliferation financing are part of broader strategies for preventing the spread of weapons and fighting financial crimes like money laundering. Governments and international organizations—like the United Nations and the Financial Action Task Force (FATF)—have created guidelines to help banks, businesses, and other institutions recognize and reduce the risks linked to these kinds of activities.

== See also ==
- Terrorism financing
- Anti–money laundering
- Money laundering
