= Weapons Intelligence, Nonproliferation, and Arms Control Center =

The Weapons Intelligence Non Proliferation and Arms Control Center (WINPAC) is a United States Intelligence Community office that provides assessments to "all types of foreign weapons threats." Among its tasks, WINPAC analyzes intelligence related to dual-use technology and export controls.

WINPAC was created in 2001 in an effort to bring together experts on foreign weapons into one center. WINPAC was preceded by the Nonproliferation Center (NPC), a Central Intelligence Agency (CIA) office established in 1992 to improve support for non-proliferation policy. NPC was one of seven 'Centers' established in the 1990s to centralize expertise as a way to better analyse transnational threats.

In the first term of the George W. Bush administration, the head of WINPAC was Alan Foley. According to the authors of the book The Italian Letter, Foley addressed his WINPAC subordinates in December 2002 to tell them, "If the president wants to go to war, our job is to find the intelligence to allow him to do so."

== Sources ==
- Jonathan Schwarz, blog post at A Tiny Revolution (on Foley).
- David Corn & Michael Isikoff, Hubris: The Inside Story of Spin, Scandal, and the Selling of the Iraq War (Crown, 2006).
