= Bharat Ramamurti =

American political advisor

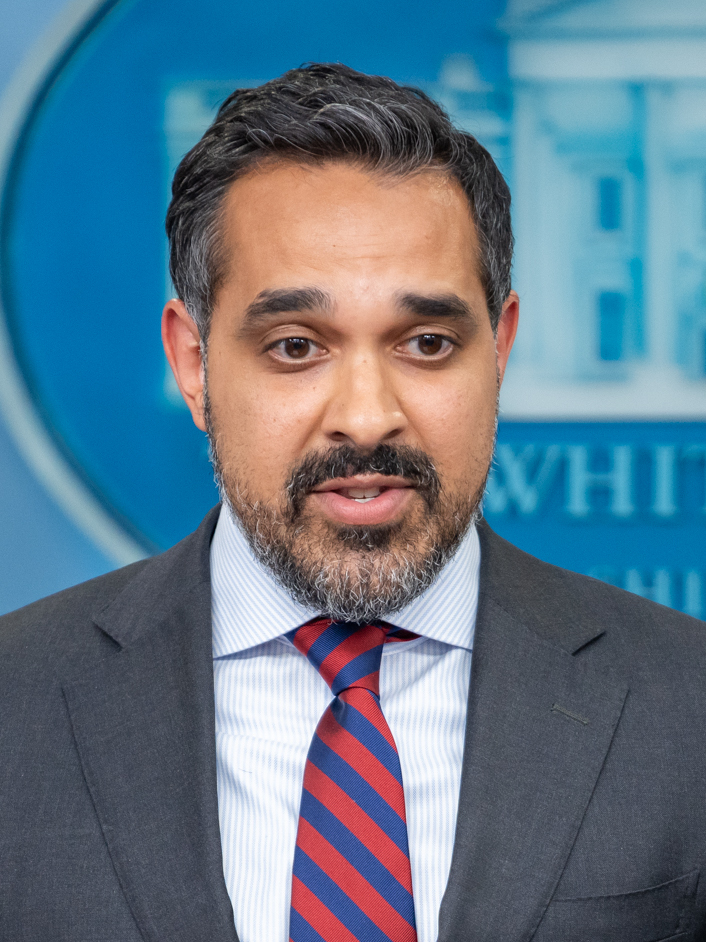
- Ramamurti in June 2023

Deputy Director of the National Economic Council
- In office January 20, 2021 – August 2023
- President: Joe Biden
- Preceded by: Andrew Olmem
- Succeeded by: Jon Donenberg

Member of the COVID-19 Congressional Oversight Commission
- In office April 17, 2020 – January 20, 2021
- Appointed by: Chuck Schumer
- Preceded by: Office established
- Succeeded by: Office disestablished

Personal details
- Born: Massachusetts, U.S.
- Party: Democratic
- Spouse: Paige Ammons
- Children: 3
- Education: Harvard University (AB); Yale University (JD)

Bharat Ramamurti is an American attorney and political advisor who served as the deputy director of the National Economic Council 2021 to 2023. He previously served as a member of the COVID-19 Congressional Oversight Commission, a congressional oversight body tasked with overseeing the Department of the Treasury's and the Federal Reserve Board's management of stimulus and loan programs mandated by the CARES Act.

== Early life and education ==
Ramamurti was born in Massachusetts to Tamil immigrants from Tamil Nadu, India. His father Ravi Ramamurti was doing his doctorate at Harvard Business School when Ramamurti was born. He was raised in Lexington, Massachusetts, and from Lexington High School in 1999 before attending Harvard College. He obtained his bachelor's degree from Harvard in social studies in 2003 and his Juris Doctor from Yale Law School in 2007.

== Career ==
After graduating from law school, Ramamurti worked as an intern in the legal department of the Boston Red Sox. He also worked as a litigator at Wilmer Cutler Pickering Hale and Dorr. A longtime United States Senate staffer, Ramamurti worked as senior counsel for banking and economic policy in the Senate office of Elizabeth Warren from 2013 to 2019. He then served as economic policy director on the Elizabeth Warren 2020 presidential campaign. In 2017, Ramamurti was mentioned as a possible appointee to the U.S. Securities and Exchange Commission.

On April 17, 2020, it was announced that Senate Minority Leader Chuck Schumer had appointed Ramamurti to serve on the newly created COVID-19 Congressional Oversight Commission. The Commission will have five members, one each appointed by the House Speaker, House Minority Leader, Senate Majority Leader, and Senate Minority Leader. After Ramamurti was nominated to serve on the Committee, he authored an op-ed in The New York Times about the panel's role in the oversight of the President's handling of the COVID-19 pandemic in the United States. He served in the role until December 2020. Ramamurti left the Biden administration in August 2023.

== Personal life ==
Ramamurti has two younger two siblings, Gita and Arjun. Both siblings also graduated from Harvard College. Ramamurti is married to Paige Ammons. The couple have three children.
