= Special Inspector General for Pandemic Recovery =

United States government oversight body

- Type: Inspector General
- Nominator: President
- Constituting instrument: Section 4018 of the CARES Act
- Formation: 2020
- Abolished: 2025
- Website: www.sigpr.gov

The Special Inspector General for Pandemic Recovery (SIGPR) was an Inspector General position created by the Coronavirus Aid, Relief, and Economic Security (CARES) Act of 2020 to oversee spending of government funds in response to the COVID-19 pandemic in the United States. The position was included at the insistence of congressional Democrats. The SIGPR was nominated by the president and confirmed by the Senate.

The position, as specified in Section 4018 of the CARES Act, was authorized to

conduct, supervise, and coordinate audits and investigations of the making, purchase, management, and sale of loans, loan guarantees, and other investments made by the Secretary of the Treasury under any program established by the Secretary under this Act, and the management by the Secretary of any program established under this Act.

== History ==
President Donald Trump signed the CARES Act into law on 27 March 2020, but immediately noted that several stipulations related oversight would be ignored. The White House highlighted the language authorizing "the SIGPR to request information from other government agencies and requires the SIGPR to report to the Congress 'without delay' any refusal of such a request that 'in the judgment of the Special Inspector General' is unreasonable" and stated that the SIGPR would not be allowed to submit reports to Congress without White House supervision. Critics of Trump's stance included Senators Mitt Romney (R-Utah) and Jon Tester (D-Mont), who wrote a letter to Trump on 3 April urging compliance with oversight requirements.

=== Brian Miller ===
On 3 April 2020, President Trump indicated that he would nominate Brian D. Miller to be the Special Inspector General for Pandemic Recovery. At the time, Miller was a special assistant to Trump and senior associate counsel in the Office of White House Counsel. This raised concerns about his ability to be apolitical and was criticized by Democrats. The selection was praised by the Project on Government Oversight. Senate Democratic Leader Chuck Schumer released a statement on April 4 saying that "a member of the president’s own staff is exactly the wrong type of person to choose for this position." Miller's qualifications include serving as the Inspector General of the General Services Administration; senior counsel to the Deputy Attorney General; Assistant United States Attorney; and counsel to the USA.

Miller was formally nominated by the Trump administration on 6 April 2020. The U.S. Senate Banking Committee held his confirmation hearing on May 5 and voted on May 12 to advance his nomination to the full Senate. The Senate confirmed him on June 2.

== See also ==
- COVID-19 Congressional Oversight Commission
- Pandemic Response Accountability Committee
- United States House Select Subcommittee on the Coronavirus Crisis
