= Wally Adeyemo =

American attorney (born 1981)

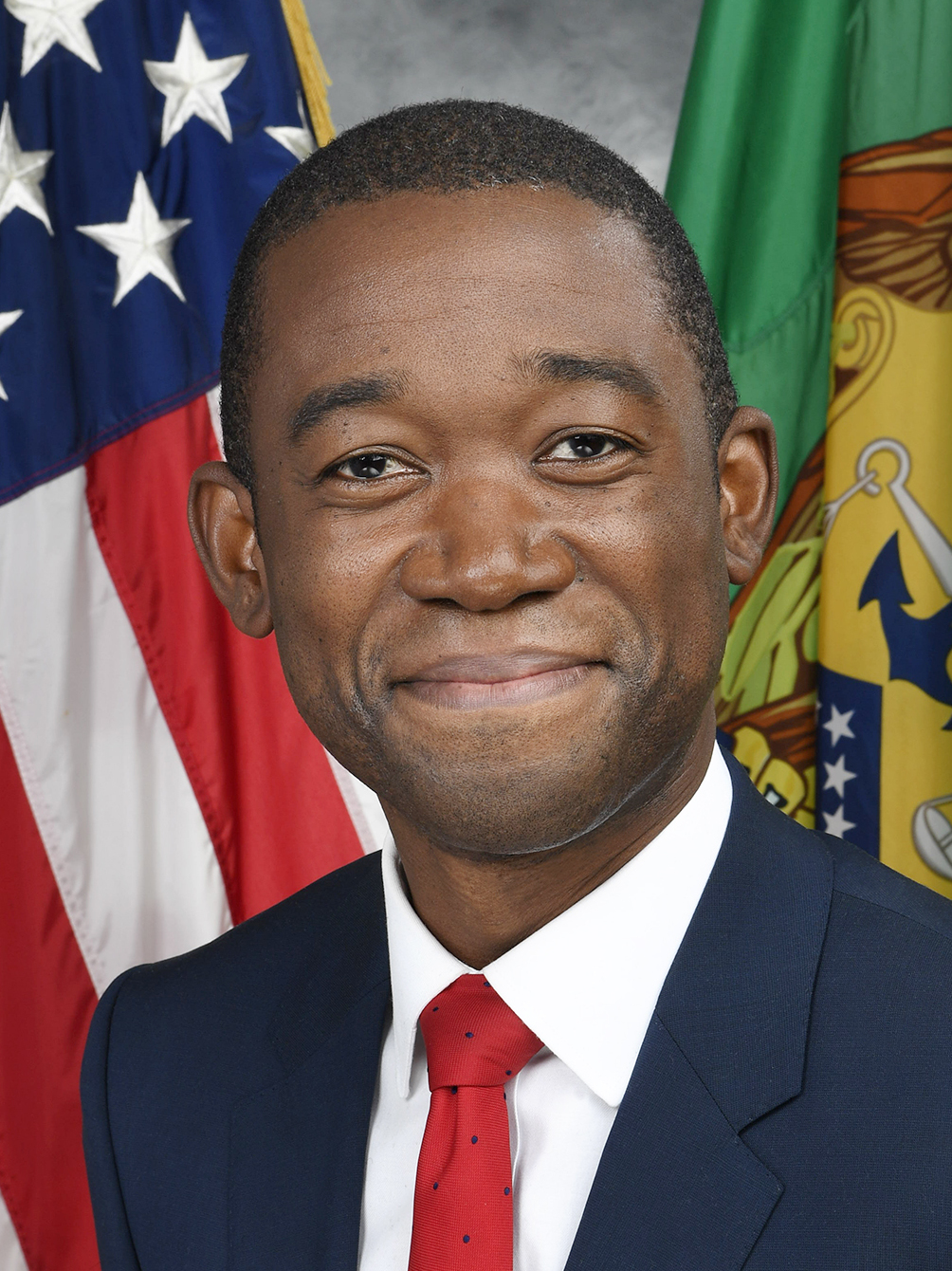
- Official portrait, 2021

15th United States Deputy Secretary of the Treasury
- In office March 26, 2021 – January 20, 2025
- President: Joe Biden
- Preceded by: Justin Muzinich
- Succeeded by: Michael Faulkender

President of the Obama Foundation
- In office August 1, 2019 – March 25, 2021
- Preceded by: Position established
- Succeeded by: Valerie Jarrett

United States Deputy National Security Advisor for International Economics
- In office 2015–2016
- President: Barack Obama
- Preceded by: Caroline Atkinson
- Succeeded by: Daleep Singh (2021)

Personal details
- Born: Adewale Adeyemo; May 20, 1981 (age 45) Ibadan, Nigeria
- Party: Democratic
- Education: University of California, Berkeley (BA); Yale University (JD)

Adewale O. "Wally" Adeyemo (born May 20, 1981) is an American attorney and political advisor. He served as the United States Deputy Secretary of the Treasury during the Presidency of Joe Biden. He was the first president of the Obama Foundation and served during the Obama administration as the deputy national security advisor for international economics from 2015 to 2016 and deputy director of the National Economic Council.

== Early life and education ==
Adeyemo was born to Yoruba parents in Ibadan, Nigeria, and raised in Southern California. His father was a teacher and his mother was a nurse. He has two younger siblings. After graduating from Eisenhower High School in Rialto, California, in 1999, he received a Bachelor of Arts degree from the University of California, Berkeley, in 2004 and a Juris Doctor degree from Yale Law School in 2009.

== Early career ==
Adeyemo served as the director of African American outreach for the John Kerry 2004 presidential campaign in California and was based in the San Francisco office.

Prior to joining the Obama administration, Adeyemo worked as an editor at the Hamilton Project. Adeyemo then served as senior advisor and deputy chief of staff to Jack Lew in the United States Department of the Treasury. Adeyemo later worked as a negotiator on the Trans-Pacific Partnership. He also served as the first chief of staff of the Consumer Financial Protection Bureau under Elizabeth Warren.

== Later career ==
=== Obama administration (2014–2016) ===
Deputy united States Secretary of the Treasury Wally Adeyemo visits Kyiv, Ukraine on May 29, 2024

In November 2014, Adeyemo was nominated to be Assistant Secretary of the Treasury for International Markets at the same time that the incumbent assistant Secretary, Marisa Lago, was nominated to be a Deputy United States Trade representative. He appeared before the Senate Committee on Banking, Housing, and Urban Affairs in September 2015, but the committee did not advance his nomination to the full Senate. The nomination was withdrawn by President Obama in December 2015.

Adeyemo was instead selected to concurrently serve as Deputy National Security Advisor for International Economics and deputy director of the National Economic Council in 2015, serving until 2016. During his tenure, he was the president's representative to the G7 and G20 and held several senior management positions at the Department of the Treasury, including senior adviser and deputy chief of staff, and chief negotiator for the Trans-Pacific Partnership’s provisions on macroeconomic policy.

=== Out of government ===
Adeyemo worked at BlackRock for two years from 2017, serving as a senior advisor, having previously been interim chief of staff for the firm's CEO, Laurence D. Fink.

On August 1, 2019, Adeyemo was selected as the first president of the Obama Foundation.

On January 13, 2025, Bloomberg reported that Adeyemo was joining Columbia University as a fellow at the School of International and Public Affairs and the Center on Global Energy Policy.

In October 2025, it was announced that Barclays had hired Adeyemo as its head of strategy and transformation, a newly created role on the group's executive committee, working out of London, England.

=== Biden administration ===
==== Nomination to Treasury ====
In November 2020, it was announced that Adeyemo would be nominated to serve as United States Deputy Secretary of the Treasury in the Biden administration. On January 20, 2021, his nomination was submitted to the Senate for confirmation. A hearing before the Senate Committee on Finance was held on February 23, 2021; his nomination was reported out of committee by voice vote on March 3. On March 25, 2021, he was confirmed by the Senate, also by voice vote.

==== Tenure ====
On March 26, 2021, he was sworn into office by Secretary Janet Yellen. Deputy Secretary Adeyemo has been heavily involved in sanctions enforcement in 2022, visiting and speaking with foreign regulators to encourage their cooperation.

On June 2, 2024, Adeyemo wrote an article for the Financial Times headlined "We need to put sand in the gears of the Russian war machine", in the context of the 2022 Russian invasion of Ukraine.

Non-profit organization positions
New office	President of the Obama Foundation; 2019–2021	Succeeded by Valerie Jarrett; Acting
Political offices
Preceded by Justin Muzinich	United States Deputy Secretary of the Treasury; 2021–2025	Succeeded by Michael Faulkender
