= Marshall Billingslea =

American government official

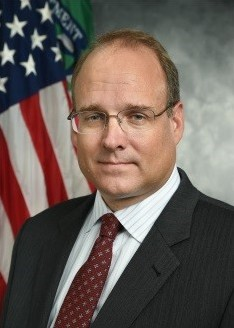

Assistant Secretary of the Treasury for Terrorist Financing
- In office June 22, 2017 – January 20, 2021
- President: Donald Trump
- Preceded by: Daniel Glaser
- Succeeded by: Elizabeth Rosenberg

Personal details
- Born: Montgomery, Alabama, U.S.
- Party: Republican
- Education: Dartmouth College (BA); Fletcher School of Law and Diplomacy, Tufts University (MA)
- Awards: Department of Defense Medal for Distinguished Public Service; Navy Distinguished Public Service Award; Order of the Cross of Terra Mariana; Order of Polonia Restituta; Cross of Merit of the Minister of Defence of the Czech Republic

Marshall Billingslea is a former Assistant Secretary for Terrorist Financing at the United States Department of the Treasury. He was the Trump administration's nominee to be Under Secretary of State for Arms Control and International Security Affairs, and he previously served as a U.S. Senate staffer and as a Department of Defense official.

== Education and early career ==
Billingslea received a B.A. from Dartmouth College and an M.A. in Law and Diplomacy from the Fletcher School of Law and Diplomacy at Tufts University. He began his career as an aide to Senator Jesse Helms, serving as a Senior Professional Staff Member for National Security Affairs on the U.S. Senate Foreign Relations Committee.

== Bush administration ==
In 2001, Billingslea became Deputy Assistant Secretary of Defense for Negotiations Policy in the Pentagon's Office of International Security Policy. During the administration of George W. Bush, Billingslea served in the United States Department of Defense as Deputy Under Secretary of the Navy, Principal Deputy Assistant Secretary of Defense for Special Operations and Low Intensity Conflict, and Deputy Assistant Secretary of Defense for Negotiation Policy.

Billingslea served in Brussels as the Assistant Secretary General of NATO for Defense Investment. As the United States’ senior civilian official serving within the alliance, he oversaw NATO's military investment programs and infrastructure budget, and worked closely with Defense and Finance Ministers across the Alliance. He was Chairman of the Conference of National Armament Directors and Chairman of NATO's C3 Board.

As Department of Defense's senior civilian for special operations (Principal Deputy Assistant Secretary of Defense for Special Operations and Low Intensity Conflict), Billingslea provided oversight for all special operations efforts against al-Qaeda following the September 11 attacks. Billingslea was a principal architect of the Department of Defense's worldwide effort against terrorist organizations. Under his leadership, Special Operations Command and its components greatly accelerated acquisition of a wide range of novel technologies and capabilities to aid special operations forces in the conduct of the Global War on Terror.

Between 2002 and 2003, Billingslea was involved in the Bush administration's enhanced interrogation techniques policy.

== Private sector career (2009–2017) ==
Between 2009 and 2017, Billingslea served as managing director at Deloitte, responsible for its Business Intelligence Services group, where he provided due diligence services for a wide range of Federal clients and Fortune 500 companies.

== Trump administration ==
During the first presidential transition of Donald Trump, Billingslea headed the United States National Security Council team.

In April 2017, Billingslea was nominated by President Donald Trump to become Assistant Secretary for Terrorist Financing in the United States Department of the Treasury. He was confirmed by the United States Senate by a vote of 65–35 on June 22, 2017.

During his tenure in the Treasury Department, Billingslea worked with members of the national security community throughout the U.S. government, foreign governments, and the private sector to identify and address threats posed or advanced by illicit finance. His areas of focus include money laundering, terrorist financing, WMD proliferation, and other criminal and illicit activities domestically and internationally. He led specific efforts to counter threats including proliferation, terrorism, and the deceptive financial practices posed by countries such as Iran and North Korea. Among other actions, he criticized Turkey over its role in Venezuela's gold trade, and he imposed sanctions against Hezbollah.

In August 2018, Billingslea was nominated to be the next Under Secretary of State for Civilian Security, Democracy, and Human Rights. His nomination was opposed by a coalition of twenty-one human rights groups, including the American Civil Liberties Union, Amnesty International, and Human Rights Watch, on the grounds that Billingslea had a "well-documented history of advocating for the use of torture and other unlawful interrogation practices." Others, including the Foundation for Defense of Democracies (FDD), wrote in support of his nomination with a letter challenging all of the claims made by these other groups. President Trump renominated him for the position in January 2019. Billingslea's involvement with controversial Bush administration interrogation techniques stalled his nomination.

On April 10, 2020, Trump appointed Billingslea as the Special Presidential Envoy for Arms Control. He is leading the U.S. negotiations with Russia on whether to extend the New START treaty and extend it to include China.

On May 1, 2020, President Trump announced his intent to nominate Billingslea to be Under Secretary of State for Arms Control and International Security Affairs, and the White House sent his nomination to the Senate on May 4, 2020. On January 3, 2021, his nomination was returned to the President under Rule XXXI, Paragraph 6 of the United States Senate.

== Financial Action Task Force (FATF) ==
In February 2018, Billingslea was endorsed unanimously by the 37 member countries of the Financial Action Task Force on Money Laundering (FATF) as the next FATF President.

The FATF Secretariat is housed at the OECD headquarters in Paris. The FATF presidency tenure is for one year, a position which Billingslea held from July 1, 2018, until June 30, 2019. During his tenure, the FATF established new standards to govern the regulation of virtual assets (crypto-currencies) and conversion of the FATF principle that terrorist financing must be criminalized, even absent a direct tie to a terrorist act, into binding international law pursuant to UN Security Council Resolution 2462.
