= Michael Faulkender =

American financial official

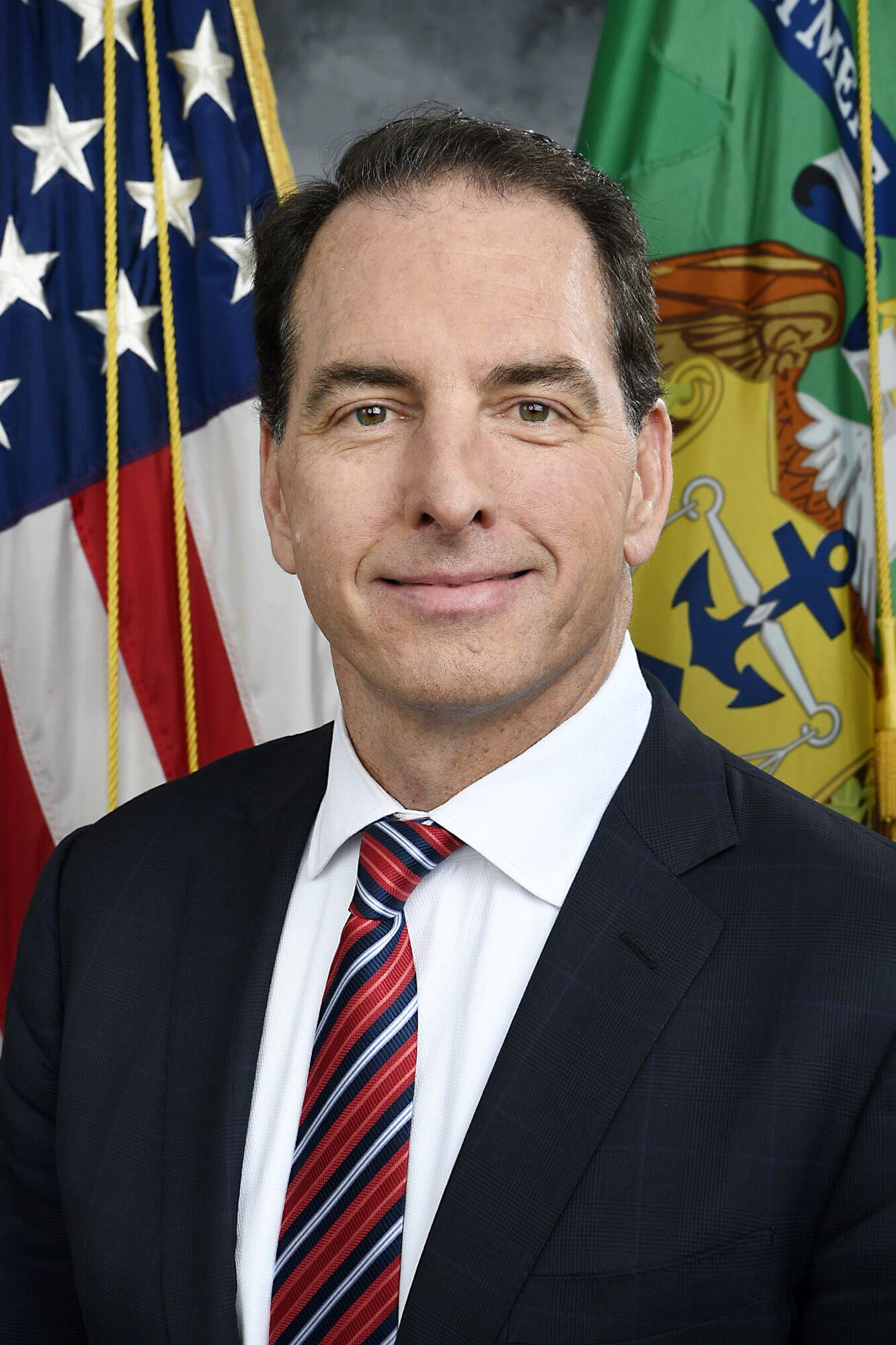
- Official portrait, 2025

16th United States Deputy Secretary of the Treasury
- In office March 28, 2025 – August 22, 2025
- President: Donald Trump
- Preceded by: Wally Adeyemo
- Succeeded by: Francis Brooke

Commissioner of Internal Revenue
- Acting
- In office April 18, 2025 – June 16, 2025
- President: Donald Trump
- Preceded by: Gary Shapley (acting)
- Succeeded by: Billy Long

Assistant Secretary of the Treasury for Economic Policy
- In office August 6, 2019 – January 20, 2021
- President: Donald Trump
- Preceded by: Karen Dynan
- Succeeded by: Ben Harris

Personal details
- Education: University of California, Davis (BS); Northwestern University (PhD)

Michael Faulkender (born 1974) is an American academic and government official who served as the 16th United States deputy secretary of the treasury.

== Education ==
Faulkender received a B.S. in managerial economics from the University of California, Davis in 1994 and his PhD in finance from Northwestern University in June 2002.

== Career ==
=== Academia ===
Faulkender is the Dean's Professor of Finance and former associate dean of master's programs and professor of finance at the Robert H. Smith School of Business at the University of Maryland. He is known for his research on executive compensation and the corporate tax practices of multinational firms. As associate dean at Maryland Smith, he helped create the business school's online master of science degree in business analytics.

Faulkender was awarded the Barclays Global Investors' Michael J. Brennan Best Paper Award in the Review of Financial Studies in 2013, for Investment and Capital Constraints: Repatriations Under the American Jobs Creation Act, co-authored with Mitchell Petersen. Faulkender was a runner-up for that prize in 2006.

=== Government ===
In Trump's first term, Faulkender served as the assistant secretary of the treasury for economic policy. On December 4, 2024, U.S. president-elect Donald Trump nominated Faulkender as deputy U.S. treasury secretary. He also served as the acting commissioner of internal revenue since April 2025. Faulkender was appointed to the role by Donald Trump, replacing Gary Shapley, whom Trump had appointed just two days earlier on April 16, 2025.

==== Senate committee nomination process ====
On March 6, 2025, there was a hearing before the Senate Finance Committee to consider Faulkender's nomination. He was confirmed on March 26, 2025.

On August 22, The Wall Street Journal reported that Faulkender was set to resign.

Political offices
Preceded by Dan Katz; Acting	United States Deputy Secretary of the Treasury; 2025	Succeeded by Derek Theurer; Acting
Government offices
Preceded by Gary Shapley; Acting	Commissioner of Internal Revenue; Acting; 2025	Succeeded by Billy Long
