= Alan Rappeport =

American journalist

- Born: Philadelphia
- Education: Emory University, London School of Economics
- Occupation: Journalist
- Years active: 2001–present
- Employer: The New York Times

Alan Rappeport is an American journalist. He is currently an economic policy reporter at The New York Times, based in Washington.

== Education ==
Rappeport was born in Philadelphia. He received a B.A. in Journalism and Philosophy from Emory University in 2001, completed a MS in journalism at Columbia University in 2002 and a MSc in Economic History at the London School of Economics.

== Career ==
Rappeport started as an intern for CNN in 2001 before becoming a staff writer at The Press of Atlantic City in 2002 following the completion of his MS in journalism at Columbia. He remained at The Press until 2004 but relocated to London when he was named the Marjorie Deane fellow at The Economist in 2006.

While in London, Rappeport Wrote for the Finance and Economics section for The Economist and then worked at CFO.com, The Economist Group's corporate finance magazine, based in Boston.

Rappeport moved to the Financial Times as a reporter in New York in 2008, covering economics and general assignment stories, until he was appointed US consumer correspondent in 2011. He then became a reporter for the paper's "FastFT' news service.

He joined The New York Times as a politics reporter in 2014, based out of the Washington bureau, and covered the 2016 presidential campaign. In 2017, Rappeport became an economic policy reporter, covering the Treasury Department, taxes and trade. He has made several appearances on MSNBC and C-SPAN as an economics analyst.
