= Derek Theurer =

American tax official and political advisor

Acting United States Deputy Secretary of the Treasury
- In office October 7, 2025 – April 28, 2026
- President: Donald Trump
- Secretary: Scott Bessent
- Preceded by: Michael Faulkender
- Succeeded by: Francis Brooke

Personal details
- Born: March 28, 1982 (age 44)
- Education: Utah State University (BS); University of California, Los Angeles (JD); New York University (LLM)

Derek Theurer is an American political advisor who had served as Assistant Secretary of the Treasury for Legislative Affairs at the U.S. Department of the Treasury. He previously served as Counselor to the Treasury Secretary, Senior Policy Advisor to Speaker of the House Mike Johnson, and as Chief Tax Counsel at the House Committee on Ways and Means and acting Deputy Secretary.

== Early life ==
In 2005, he graduated summa cum laude with a B.S. in accounting from Utah State University. He holds a J.D. from UCLA School of Law and an LL.M. in Tax from NYU School of Law.

== Career ==
Theurer began his career as a tax attorney at Exxon Mobil Corporation. He served as Senior Tax Counsel in the Senate in 2017, contributing to the design and passage of the Tax Cuts and Jobs Act. He was named Vice President for Tax and Fiscal Policy at the Business Roundtable in 2018. In January 2021, Theurer was hired as Chief Tax Counsel by Kevin Brady, top Republican on the House Ways and Means Committee. He continued in the role after Jason Smith became Ways and Means Chairman in 2023. In June 2025, Theurer became Senior Policy Advisor to Speaker Mike Johnson, handling tax, trade, and financial services matters.

In January 2025, Theurer moved to the Department of the Treasury to serve as Counselor to the Secretary. He advises Secretary of the Treasury Scott Bessent on domestic and international tax policy.

On March 24, 2025, President Donald J. Trump nominated Theurer to be Deputy Under Secretary of the Treasury. He was confirmed by the Senate 53-43 on December 18, 2025.

Political offices
Preceded by Michael Faulkender	United States Deputy Secretary of the Treasury; Acting; 2025–2026	Succeeded by Francis Brooke
