= Chief of Staff to the United States Secretary of the Treasury =

Coordinator of the supporting staff in the U.S. Treasury

The chief of staff to the secretary of the Treasury is the coordinator of the supporting staff, primary aide to the United States Secretary of the Treasury and, as deputy secretary, has authority to stand in for the secretary. According to Treasury Order 101-05, the chief of staff "shall report directly to the Secretary and shall exercise supervision over the Deputy Chief of Staff, Executive Secretary, Director of Scheduling, and the other officials and offices within the Office of the Chief of Staff" among there duties. The order was issued over the signature of Treasury secretary Henry Paulson and superseded Treasury Order 101-05 dated May 17, 2002.
