= American Investment Council =

Private equity industry lobbying group

- Formation: February 2007; 19 years ago
- Purpose: Advocacy, research and lobbying for the private equity industry
- Headquarters: Washington, D.C., U.S.
- Website: http://www.investmentcouncil.org/

The American Investment Council (AIC), formerly the Private Equity Growth Capital Council (PEGCC), is a lobbying, advocacy, and research organization based in Washington, D.C., that was launched by a consortium of private equity firms in February 2007. It focuses on defending and promoting the private equity and growth capital investment industry to lawmakers and the public at large. Its members include some of the world's largest private equity firms.

== History ==
=== Founding and early history ===
The concept for a trade association for the private equity industry originated in 2006, as the private equity market reached the peak of its mid-2000s buyout boom and it became the subject of increased criticism and government scrutiny. That year, private equity firms were involved in around 28% of acquisitions by dollar value, compared to 3% in 2001. In late 2006, the Private Equity Council (PEC) was formed as the industry's principal lobbying organization. The trade association was officially launched in Washington, D.C., in February 2007.

The original Private Equity Council logo in use from the formation of the organization through September 2010

The AIC provides research on issues including the impact of private equity on job creation and pension funds' returns in order to educate business leaders, policymakers, the media, and labor organizations about the private equity industry. In addition to its research and communications endeavors, the Council's mission also includes advocacy on behalf of private equity firms and the growth capital investment industry.

=== Expansion and renaming ===
In 2010, the PEC expanded its membership to include a broader selection of private equity industry stakeholders. In September 2010, eighteen new members were added, including middle-market private equity firms and growth capital investment firms. Following this expansion, the PEC changed its name to the Private Equity Growth Capital Council (PEGCC) to reflect a broader membership. According to the Council, in addition to the name change it created a committee called the "Growth Capital Committee" to focus specifically on issues related to middle and small market firms. In 2016, the PEGCC changed its name to the American Investment Council to "reflect the increased diversity of PE firms and growing focus of the industry."

=== Member firms ===
The AIC's members include some of the largest private equity firms globally, along with an Associate Member class of advisory and law firms that have a private equity practice. A full list of members can be found on the AIC's website.

== Activities ==
Since its launch in 2007, the AIC has spent over $11 million on lobbying. It also commissions and publicizes research favorable to the private equity industry.

In addition to its research and lobbying activities, the trade association has developed best practice guidelines. In 2009, it developed a set of "guidelines for responsible investment", which were adopted by its members, covering such issues as health, safety, labor, governance, transparency for stakeholders and respect for human rights. The guidelines were produced in accordance with the United Nations' Principles for Responsible Investment (PRI), from discussions between AIC members and a group of institutional investors. The guidelines focus on transparency of private equity transactions and ensuring compliance with all applicable laws, both in the United States and overseas, and encourage adding value to members' portfolio companies. The AIC received positive feedback on its guidelines from PRI executive director James Gifford, and the chief investment officers of California Public Employees Retirement Systems (CalPERS) and California State Teachers' Retirement System (CalSTRS), but the Service Employees International Union (SEIU) remained critical of the industry, arguing that outside regulation was needed rather than internal guidelines.

In 2016, the AIC, in partnership with the National Association of Investment Companies, launched The Private Equity Women’s Initiative. The initiative promotes the recruitment and retention of women in private equity industry. Through this initiative, AIC membership promotes Guidelines and Best Practices for better gender parity in private equity.

== Studies and reports ==
The AIC releases quarterly and annual reports that highlight fundraising and investment trends, measure PE performance, and analyze top states and districts for investments. These reports share the impact that private equity has across the country.

=== Top States and Districts Report ===
In 2011, the AIC released its first Top States and Districts report, a ranking of the top 20 states and Congressional districts receiving the most private equity investment and that have the most private equity-backed companies. The report features an interactive map on the AIC's website that allows visitors to find out information about private equity investment in every state, including data about pension funds. Thomson Reuters and proprietary data collected by the AIC provide data for the report.

=== Other reports ===
In early 2007 the private equity industry was criticized by the Service Employees International Union (SEIU), which argued that the industry put employees at risk of job loss and had a negative impact on job creation. In response to this criticism, the AIC commissioned a number of studies and reports. In September 2007, an AIC report detailed three case studies of private equity owned companies that became more competitive and increased employment following their buyout. The following January, a study for the Council by Robert J. Shapiro and economist Nam Pham found that 76% of companies owned by eight private equity firms reported an increase in jobs. The study observed "significantly greater job gains" in private equity transactions compared with the overall market. In 2010 an AIC report found that portfolio companies outperform publicly owned companies by 7% over three years and 11% over five years, countering claims that private equity has a negative impact operational improvement.

Other reports commissioned by the Council include a plan to improve the U.S. economy, produced by economists Martin Neil Baily and Matthew Slaughter, and a report estimating the total employment by private equity owned companies to be 11 million people. Pensions & Investments magazine stated that this was the first time that employment by the industry had been quantified.

== Legislation and regulation ==
The AIC has advocated before Congress in support of the private equity industry on numerous occasions. In 2009, the then-president of the PEC, Douglas Lowenstein, testified before the House Financial Services Committee (HFSC) in support of legislation requiring private equity and hedge funds to register with the Securities and Exchange Commission (SEC). He stated that the PEC supported registration under the proposed Private Fund Investment Advisers Registration Act because its members perceived the law as an important component of protection for investors against systemic risk. While supporting registration, Lowenstein raised concerns regarding cost for smaller firms.

The AIC has testified before Congress on the industry's role in the economy. In 2007, Lowenstein testified before the HFSC on the impact of private equity on employment and companies. In 2009, its chairman Mark Tresnowski testified before the Senate Banking Subcommittee on the potential role of private equity in the recovery of the U.S. economy.

The AIC's initial lobbying efforts were focused on opposing proposed legislation to increase taxation of private equity managers' fees. The AIC supported keeping the carried interest tax on managers' fees at the 15 percent capital gains rate, rather than increasing it to the earned income rate. The proposed legislation was rejected but similar proposals were raised in 2009 and 2011, and the AIC continued to oppose them.

=== Lobbying disclosures ===
As required by the Lobbying Disclosure Act of 1995 and Honest Leadership and Open Government Act of 2007, the Council is a registered lobbying organization and files quarterly reports concerning these activities, including the amount of money spent specifically on lobbying.

==== Annual reported lobbying expenditures ====
- 2007: $1,720,000
- 2008: $3,360,000
- 2009: $3,590,000
- 2010: $2,430,000
- 2011: $2,220,000
