= Brian D. Miller (attorney) =

American lawyer

Brian Miller

United States Attorney for the Middle District of Pennsylvania
- Incumbent
- Assumed office October 27, 2025; Interim: October 27, 2025 – February 24, 2026
- President: Donald Trump
- Preceded by: John Gurganus

Special Inspector General for Pandemic Recovery
- In office June 5, 2020 – March 27, 2025
- President: Donald Trump; Joe Biden; Donald Trump
- Preceded by: Position established
- Succeeded by: Position abolished

Inspector General of the General Services Administration
- In office August 9, 2005 – May 1, 2014
- President: George W. Bush; Barack Obama
- Preceded by: Joel Gallay (Acting)
- Succeeded by: Robert Erickson (Acting)

Personal details
- Education: Temple University (BA); University of Texas at Austin (JD); Westminster Theological Seminary (MA)

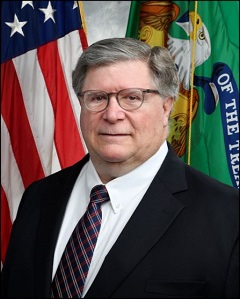
Portrait of Miller as SIGPR

Brian David Miller is an American attorney who served as the Special Inspector General for Pandemic Recovery (SIGPR). In this role, Miller oversees the United States Department of the Treasury's implementation of the Coronavirus Economic Stablization Act of 2020, part of the Coronavirus Aid, Relief, and Economic Security (CARES) Act. In September 2025, President Donald Trump nominated Miller to become the United States Attorney for the United States District Court for the Middle District of Pennsylvania. Miller began serving as interim U.S. Attorney in October 2025 after being appointed by U.S. Attorney General Pam Bondi. He was confirmed by the Senate as U.S. Attorney for the Middle District of Pennsylvania.

== Early life and education ==
Miller received his Bachelor of Arts degree from Temple University, Juris Doctor from the University of Texas School of Law, and Master of Arts from Westminster Theological Seminary.

== Career ==
Miller was formally nominated as SIGPR by the Trump administration on 6 April 2020, a move that the Trump administration had signaled several days earlier, which had prompted Montana Senator Jon Tester and Utah Senator Mitt Romney to draft a letter to the president requesting a different, independent Special Inspector General. The U.S. Senate Banking Committee held his confirmation hearing on May 5 and voted on May 12 to advance his nomination to the full Senate. The Senate confirmed him on June 2.
