= United States Deputy Secretary of the Treasury =

US federal role

Deputy Secretary of the Treasury of the United States
- Seal of the Department of Treasury

- Flag of the deputy secretary of treasury

- Incumbent; Francis Brooke since April 28, 2026 (Note: Acting: April 28, 2026-September 22, 2026)
- United States Department of Treasury
- Reports to: United States Secretary of the Treasury
- Seat: Treasury Building; Washington, D.C.
- Appointer: The president; with Senate advice and consent
- Term length: No fixed term
- Constituting instrument: 31 U.S.C. § 301
- Formation: February 16, 1981
- First holder: R. T. McNamar
- Salary: Executive Schedule, level 2
- Website: www.treasury.gov

The deputy secretary of the treasury of the United States advises and assists the secretary of the treasury in the supervision and direction of the Department of the Treasury and its activities, and succeeds the secretary in the secretary's absence, sickness, or unavailability. The deputy secretary plays a primary role in the formulation and execution of Treasury policies and programs in all aspects of the department's activities. In addition, the deputy secretary is the only official other than the secretary who can sign a treasury order, which is a document that delegates authority residing in the secretary or deputy secretary to another treasury official, establishes treasury policy, and establishes the reporting relationships and supervision of officials. Former deputy secretaries include Roger Altman, Lawrence Summers, Stuart E. Eizenstat, Kenneth W. Dam, and Samuel Bodman.

The office of deputy secretary is the successor of the "under secretary of the treasury", the former chief deputy to the secretary. Today, several treasury officials hold the title of "under secretary". Among those who served as under secretary when it was the number-two position in the department include Dean Acheson, Henry Morgenthau Jr., John W. Hanes II, and O. Max Gardner (1946–1947).

== List of deputy secretaries of the treasury ==
Status

Denotes an acting deputy secretary of the treasury

No.	Image	Name	Term began	Term ended	Secretaries of the Treasury Serving Under	President(s) served under
1		R. T. McNamar	January 20, 1981	October 7, 1985	Donald Regan	Ronald Reagan
1		R. T. McNamar	January 20, 1981	October 7, 1985	James Baker	Ronald Reagan
2		Richard Darman	October 7, 1985	August 28, 1987	James Baker	Ronald Reagan
3		M. Peter McPherson	October 15, 1987	January 20, 1989	James Baker	Ronald Reagan
3		M. Peter McPherson	October 15, 1987	January 20, 1989	Nicholas F. Brady	Ronald Reagan
4		John E. Robson	January 20, 1989	December 30, 1992	Nicholas F. Brady	George H. W. Bush
5		Roger Altman	January 20, 1993	August 17, 1994	Lloyd Bentsen	Bill Clinton
6		Frank N. Newman	September 28, 1994	March 5, 1995	Lloyd Bentsen	Bill Clinton
6		Frank N. Newman	September 28, 1994	March 5, 1995	Robert Rubin	Bill Clinton
7		Lawrence Summers	March 11, 1995	July 2, 1999	Robert Rubin	Bill Clinton
8		Stuart E. Eizenstat	July 16, 1999	January 20, 2001	Robert Rubin	Bill Clinton
8		Stuart E. Eizenstat	July 16, 1999	January 20, 2001	Lawrence Summers	Bill Clinton
9		Kenneth W. Dam	January 20, 2001	July 13, 2004	Paul H. O'Neill	George W. Bush
10		Samuel Bodman	August 2004	January 31, 2005	John W. Snow	George W. Bush
11		Robert M. Kimmitt	August 16, 2005	January 20, 2009	John W. Snow	George W. Bush
11		Robert M. Kimmitt	August 16, 2005	January 20, 2009	Henry Paulson	George W. Bush
12		Neal S. Wolin	May 18, 2009	August 31, 2013	Timothy Geithner	Barack Obama
–		Mary J. Miller; Acting	August 31, 2013	March 19, 2014	Jack Lew	Barack Obama
13		Sarah Bloom Raskin	March 19, 2014	January 20, 2017	Jack Lew	Barack Obama
–		Sigal Mandelker; Acting	June 26, 2017	December 12, 2018	Steve Mnuchin	Donald Trump
14		Justin Muzinich	December 12, 2018	January 20, 2021	Steve Mnuchin	Donald Trump
15		Wally Adeyemo	March 26, 2021	January 20, 2025	Janet Yellen	Joe Biden
–		David Lebryk; Acting	January 20, 2025	January 31, 2025	Scott Bessent	Donald Trump
–		Dan Katz; Acting	February 3, 2025	March 28, 2025	Scott Bessent	Donald Trump
16		Michael Faulkender	March 28, 2025	August 22, 2025	Scott Bessent	Donald Trump
–		Derek Theurer; Acting	October 7, 2025	April 28, 2026	Scott Bessent	Donald Trump
17		Francis Brooke	April 28, 2026	September 22, 2026	Scott Bessent	Donald Trump
17		Francis Brooke	September 22, 2026	Incumbent	Scott Bessent	Donald Trump
