= List of Department of the Treasury appointments by Joe Biden =

Nominations/appointments to the Department of the Treasury by the 46th U.S. President

Below is a list of nominations and appointments to the Department of the Treasury by Joe Biden, the 46th president of the United States. As of June 28, 2024, according to tracking by The Washington Post and Partnership for Public Service, 13 nominees have been confirmed, 5 nominees are being considered by the Senate, 7 positions do not have nominees, and 12 appointments have been made to positions that don't require Senate confirmation.

== Color key ==
Denotes appointees awaiting Senate confirmation.

Denotes appointees serving in an acting capacity.

Denotes appointees who have left office or offices which have been disbanded.

== Leadership ==
Office	Nominee	Assumed office	Left office
— Secretary of the Treasury	Janet Yellen	January 26, 2021 (Confirmed January 25, 2021, 84–15)	—
— Deputy Secretary of the Treasury	Wally Adeyemo	March 26, 2021 (Confirmed March 25, 2021 by voice vote)	—

== Office of the Secretary & Deputy Secretary ==
Office	Nominee	Assumed office	Left office
— General Counsel of the Treasury	Neil MacBride	February 22, 2022 (Confirmed February 9, 2022, 61–33)	June 28, 2024
— Assistant Secretary of the Treasury (Economic Policy)	Ben Harris	November 15, 2021 (Confirmed November 3, 2021, 78–21)	March 30, 2023
— Assistant Secretary of the Treasury (Legislative Affairs)	Jonathan Davidson	November 15, 2021 (Confirmed November 2, 2021, 88–10)	August 12, 2023
— Assistant Secretary of the Treasury (Management)	Anna Canfield Roth	February 2023	July 2024
— Assistant Secretary of the Treasury (Public Affairs)	Lily Adams	March 2022	—
— Assistant Secretary of the Treasury (Public Affairs)	Calvin Mitchell	January 20, 2021	March 2022
— Assistant Secretary of the Treasury (Tax Policy)	Lily Batchelder	September 27, 2021 (Confirmed September 22, 2021, 64–34)	February 2024

== Office of the Treasurer of the United States ==
Office	Nominee	Assumed office	Left office
— Treasurer of the United States	Marilynn Malerba	September 12, 2022	November 15, 2024
— Director of the United States Mint	Ventris Gibson	June 22, 2022 (Confirmed June 15, 2022 by voice vote)	—

== Office of Domestic Finance ==
Office	Nominee	Assumed office	Left office
— Under Secretary of the Treasury (Domestic Finance)	Nellie Liang	July 22, 2021 (Confirmed July 15, 2021, 72–27)	—
— Assistant Secretary of the Treasury (Financial Institutions)	Graham Steele	December 3, 2021 (Confirmed November 16, 2021, 53–42)	January 19, 2024
— Assistant Secretary of the Treasury (Financial Markets)	Joshua Frost	May 11, 2022 (Confirmed May 3, 2022, 54–42)	—

== Office of International Affairs ==
Office	Nominee	Assumed office	Left office
— Under Secretary of the Treasury (International Affairs)	Jay Shambaugh	January 13, 2023 (Confirmed December 13, 2022, 70–27)	—
— Deputy Under Secretary- Designated Assistant Secretary of the Treasury (International Finance and Development)	Brent Neiman	March 2023 (Confirmed March 15, 2023, 54–40)	—
— Assistant Secretary of the Treasury (International Markets and Development)	Alexia Latortue	January 13, 2022 (Confirmed December 18, 2021 by voice vote)	—
— Assistant Secretary of the Treasury (Investment Security)	Paul M. Rosen	August 5, 2022 (Confirmed May 24, 2022 by voice vote)	December 2024

== Office of Terrorism and Financial Intelligence ==
Office	Nominee	Assumed office	Left office
— Under Secretary of the Treasury (Terrorism and Financial Intelligence)	Brian E. Nelson	December 16, 2021 (Confirmed December 2, 2021, 50–49)	—
— Assistant Secretary of the Treasury (Intelligence and Analysis)	Shannon Corless	January 13, 2022 (Confirmed December 16, 2021 by voice vote)	—
— Assistant Secretary of the Treasury (Terrorist Financing)	Elizabeth Rosenberg	January 11, 2022 (Confirmed December 18, 2021 by voice vote)	February 1, 2024

== Community Development Advisory Board ==
Office	Nominee	Assumed office	Left office
— Member of the Community Development Advisory Board	Marla Bilonick	Announced September 15, 2021	—
— Member of the Community Development Advisory Board	Dave Glaser	Announced September 15, 2021	—
— Member of the Community Development Advisory Board	Patrice Kunesh	Announced September 15, 2021	—
— Member of the Community Development Advisory Board	Luis Pastor	Announced September 15, 2021	—
— Member of the Community Development Advisory Board	Harold Pettigrew, Jr.	Announced September 15, 2021	—
— Member of the Community Development Advisory Board	Jennifer Sun	Announced September 15, 2021	—
— Member of the Community Development Advisory Board	Michael Swack	Announced September 15, 2021	—
— Member of the Community Development Advisory Board	Alan Thian	Announced September 15, 2021	—
— Member of the Community Development Advisory Board	Darrin Williams	Announced September 15, 2021	—

== Internal Revenue Service ==
Office	Nominee	Assumed office	Left office
— Commissioner of the Internal Revenue Service	Daniel Werfel	March 13, 2023 (Confirmed March 9, 2023, 54–42)	—
— Chief Counsel of the Internal Revenue Service	Marjorie Rollinson	March 6, 2024 (Confirmed February 29, 2024, 56–41)	—

== Withdrawn nominations ==
Office	Nominee	Announced	Withdrawn	Notes
— Under Secretary of the Treasury (International Affairs)	Heidi Crebo-Rediker	Reported April 30, 2021	July 12, 2021	Nomination not formally announced or sent to Senate.
— Comptroller of the Currency	Saule Omarova	September 23, 2021	December 7, 2021	
— Inspector General of the Treasury	Richard K. Delmar	June 3, 2022	January 3, 2023	
— Director of the Office of Financial Research	Ron Borzekowski	January 23, 2023	January 3, 2025	
— Assistant Secretary of the Treasury (Legislative Affairs)	Corey Tellez	November 9, 2023	January 3, 2025	
— Inspector General of the Treasury	James R. Ives	January 11, 2024	January 3, 2025	
— Assistant Secretary of the Treasury (Financial Institutions)	Kristin Johnson	June 13, 2024	January 3, 2025	
— Member of the Financial Stability Oversight Council	Gordon Ito	June 13, 2024	January 3, 2025	
— Treasury Inspector General for Tax Administration	David Samuel Johnson	July 23, 2024	January 3, 2025	

== See also ==
- Cabinet of Joe Biden, for the vetting process undergone by top-level roles including advice and consent by the Senate
- List of executive branch 'czars' e.g. Special Advisor to the President

== Notes ==
Confirmation votes

Confirmations by roll call vote

Confirmations by voice vote
