= Michael S. Selig =

American lawyer

Michael Selig
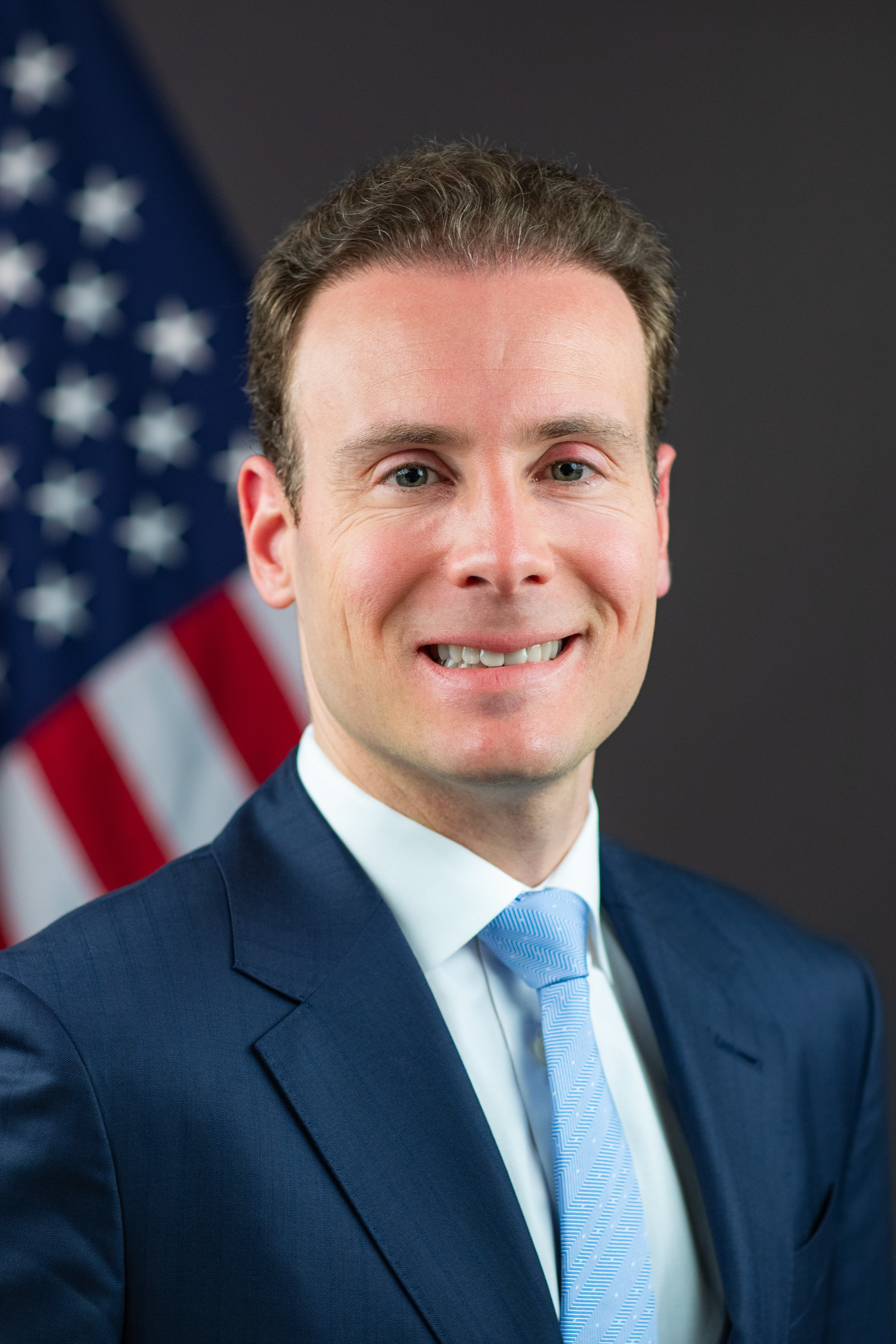
- Official portrait, 2025

Chair of the Commodity Futures Trading Commission
- Incumbent
- Assumed office December 22, 2025
- President: Donald Trump
- Preceded by: Caroline Pham (acting)

Commissioner of the Commodity Futures Trading Commission
- Incumbent
- Assumed office December 22, 2025
- President: Donald Trump
- Preceded by: Christy Goldsmith Romero

Personal details
- Party: Republican
- Education: Florida State University (BS); George Washington University (JD)

Michael S. Selig (/ˈsiːlɪɡ/ SEE-lig) is an American lawyer who has served as Chair of the Commodity Futures Trading Commission (CFTC) since December 22, 2025. Prior to his appointment to the CFTC, Selig was a corporate lawyer for cryptocurrency firms and prediction markets, two industries regulated by the CFTC. He is the youngest CFTC Chairman ever at 36 years old.

== Early life and education ==
Selig earned an undergraduate degree from Florida State University. He attended law school at George Washington University Law School, during which time he was articles editor for The George Washington Law Review, and graduated in 2015.

== Career ==
Selig worked as a law clerk for Commissioner J. Christopher Giancarlo at the Commodity Futures Trading Commission from 2014 to 2015. He was a partner at Willkie Farr & Gallagher from 2022 to 2025, where he represented cryptocurrency industry clients including eToro and Paradigm.

== Public service ==
In 2025, Selig became chief counsel for the cryptocurrency task force at the Securities and Exchange Commission (SEC) and a senior adviser to Chairman Paul S. Atkins.

=== CFTC chair ===
In October 2025, President Donald Trump nominated Selig to chair the CFTC, around a month after the White House rescinded its nomination of Brian Quintenz for the role. Selig was confirmed by the Senate on December 18, 2025 and sworn in on December 22. After his confirmation, the single remaining CFTC Commissioner, Caroline Pham, resigned, leaving Selig as the only Commissioner on the normally five-person Commission.

Selig has sided with prediction markets and cryptocurrency forms in regulatory disputes. Under his tenure as Chair of the CFTC, he has sued several states that attempt to regulate sports gambling on prediction markets. In February 2026, he announced that the CFTC would file an amicus brief in support of Crypto.com in its litigation against the state of Nevada, arguing that the CFTC has exclusive regulatory authority over prediction market exchanges, thereby preempting state gaming regulators. Selig has said that the CFTC under the Biden administration was overzealous in its regulatory enforcement against cryptocurrency companies. Selig has complained about "fake news" and argued that prediction markets are "truth machines."

Selig's leadership at the CFTC has been criticized for failing to enforce regulatory oversight or collect penalties for acts of fraud by industries and individuals.
