= Sean O. Cota =

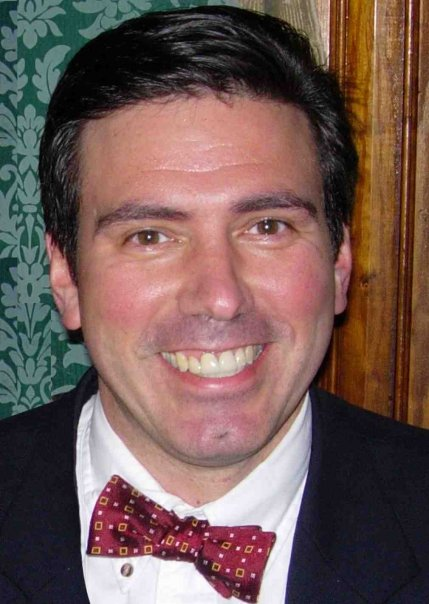

Current Associate Member, CFTC Energy and Environmental Markets Advisory Committee
- Incumbent
- Assumed office November 2019

Personal details
- Born: c. 1963 Maine
- Party: Democratic
- Education: Kalamazoo College

Sean O'Brien Cota (born June 27, 1963) is an American businessman, energy market expert, financial commentator, and policy advisor on American energy and financial market transparency and reform measures. As the President of a third generation family-owned oil company, Cota & Cota Oil, Inc. in Bellows Falls, VT, whom he has worked for since 1977, he became extremely involved in energy commodity trading in 1988. In 2010, he was named Chairman of the Petroleum Marketers Association of America.

He has testified before the United States Senate, U.S. House of Representatives, and the Commodity Futures Trading Commission (CFTC) on over a dozen separate occasions as recently as September 2021; first as an expert panelist on energy trading market functions, and later on the general subject areas of swaps, futures, options, and other 'exotic' structured financial products. He is a member of the CFTC Energy and Environmental Markets Advisory Committee.

On March 24, 2011, US Senator Patrick Leahy encouraged US President Barack Obama to appoint Cota to become the next Commissioner of the CFTC then led by Gary Gensler, currently Rostin Behnam, after formally nominating him for the post.

Mr. Cota is a leader in the Commodity Markets Oversight Coalition, and the Derivatives Reform Alliance, where he provides financial and physical hedging experience and counsel to the groups. He provided these groups significant counsel in the development of the "Close the Enron Loophole Act" Commodity Futures Modernization.

Mr. Cota was featured on the January 9, 2009 60 Minutes episode "The Price of Oil/The Chairman/Wyclef" which discusses whether Wall Street speculation is driving up the price of Oil to American consumers.

Mr. Cota recently retired as the President & CEO of the National Energy & Fuels Institute and one of Foundation Officers of the NEFI Educational Foundation where he was instrumental in the advocacy of the US heating oil industry to adopt new clean energy standards in 2019 and 2020.

As of 2025, Mr. Cota is currently serving as the President & CEO of Talon Energy Development supplying gas turbines to the datacenter and industrial space.
