= Latortue =

Latortue is a surname. Notable people with the surname include:

- Alexia Latortue (fl. 1997), American development official
- Gérard Latortue (1934–2023), Haitian politician and diplomat
- Youri Latortue (born 1967), Haitian politician
