= Dawn DeBerry Stump =

American government official

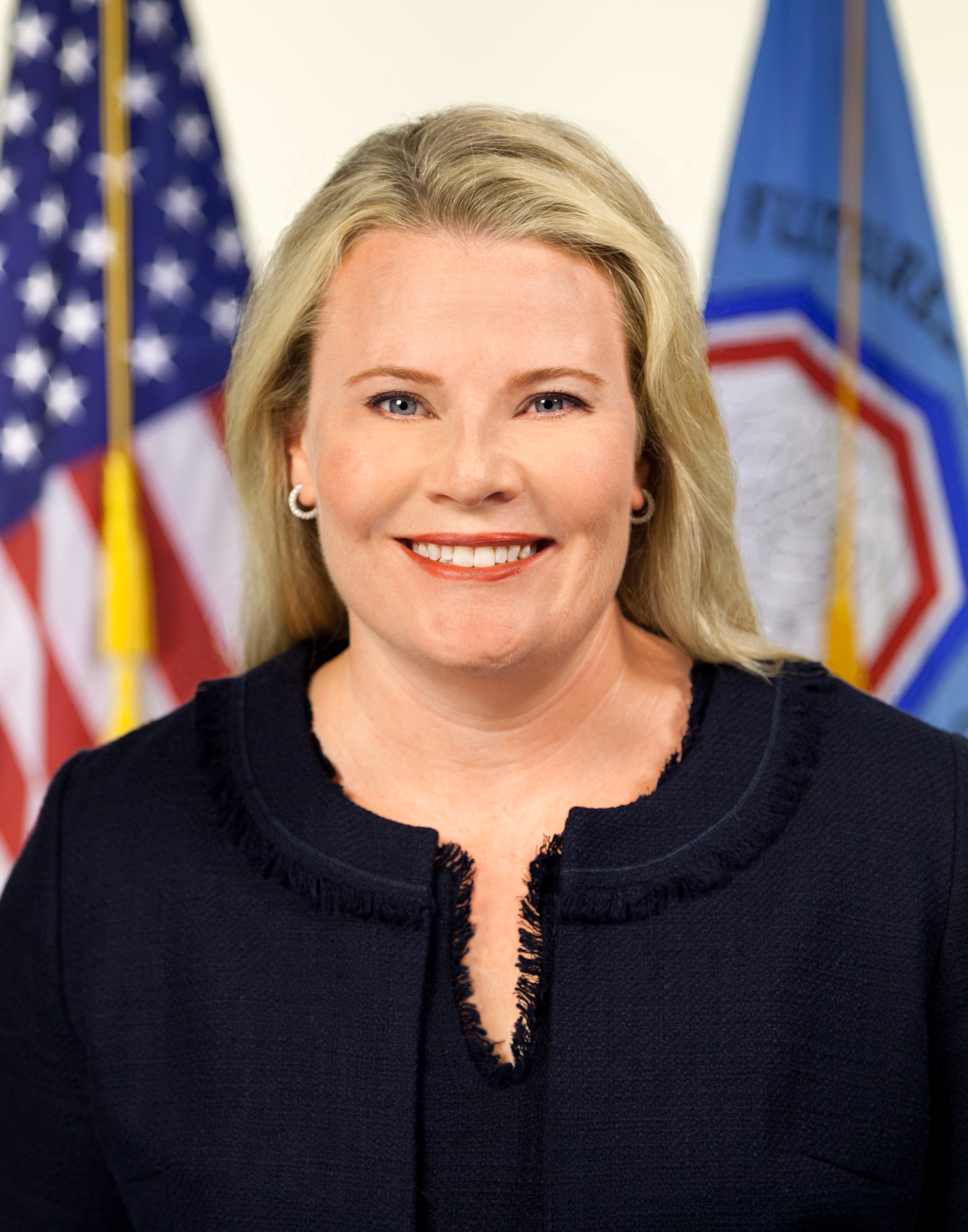

Commissioner of the Commodity Futures Trading Commission
- In office September 5, 2018 – April 14, 2022
- President: Donald Trump; Joe Biden
- Preceded by: Timothy Massad
- Succeeded by: Caroline Pham

Personal details
- Born: Olton, Texas
- Education: Texas Tech University

Dawn DeBerry Stump is an American businesswoman who served as a commissioner of the Commodity Futures Trading Commission.

== Career ==
She is the president of Stump Strategic, a consulting firm that she founded in 2016. Stump became a Commissioner of the Commodity Futures Trading Commission after being nominated by President Donald Trump and confirmed by the United States Senate. Stump previously served as executive director of the Americas Advisory Board for the Futures Industry Association and as a vice president at NYSE Euronext. She has held various staff positions at both the United States Senate and United States House of Representatives, including a role with the United States Senate Committee on Agriculture, Nutrition and Forestry which oversees the CFTC.
