= Dan Berkovitz =

American politician

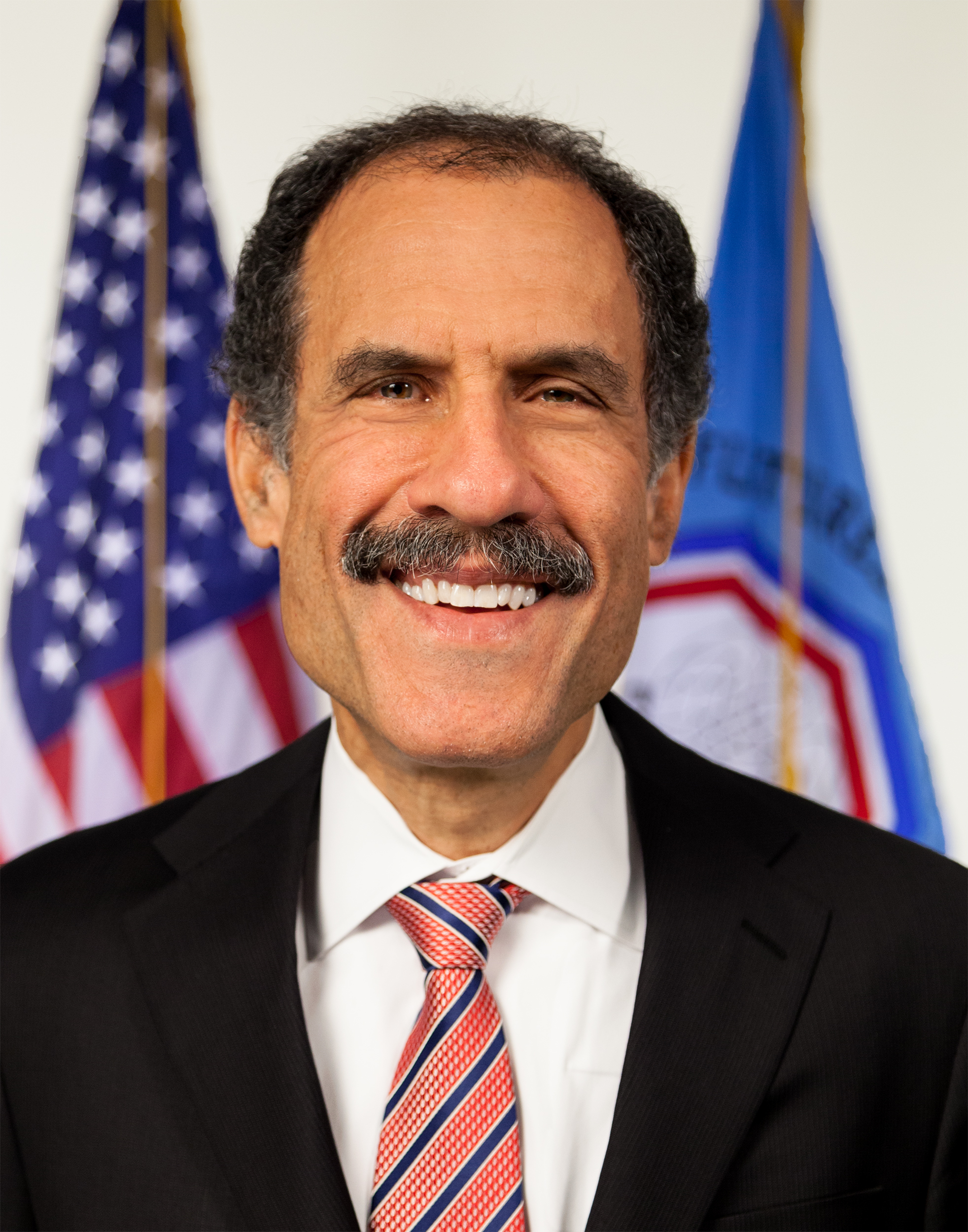

Commissioner of the Commodity Futures Trading Commission
- In office September 7, 2018 – October 15, 2021
- President: Donald Trump; Joe Biden
- Preceded by: Sharon Y. Bowen
- Succeeded by: Summer Mersinger

Personal details
- Party: Democratic
- Children: 2
- Education: Princeton University (A.B.); UC Hastings (J.D.)

Dan Michael Berkovitz was nominated by President Donald Trump to serve as a commissioner of the Commodity Futures Trading Commission on April 24, 2018. He was unanimously confirmed by the Senate on August 28, 2018 and sworn into office on September 7, 2018 for a five-year term expiring on April 13, 2023.

On September 9, 2021, Berkovitz announced plans to leave the CFTC effective October 15, 2021. He subsequently announced that he would serve as general counsel for the Securities and Exchange Commission.

Prior to his appointment, Berkovitz was a partner and co-chair of the futures and derivatives practice at the law firm of WilmerHale. He also was an adjunct professor at Georgetown University Law School, and vice-chair of the American Bar Association Committee on Futures and Derivatives.

Berkovitz served as general counsel of the CFTC from 2009 to 2013 under then-chairman Gary Gensler. While serving in this role, he was the agency's deputy representative to the Financial Stability Oversight Council (FSOC). Before the CFTC, Berkovitz was a senior staff lawyer for the U.S. Senate Permanent Subcommittee on Investigations. He also served as Deputy Assistant Secretary in the Department of Energy's Office of Environmental Management.

Berkovitz obtained a Bachelor of Arts in physics from Princeton University and a Juris Doctor from the University of California, Hastings College of the Law. He and his wife Michelle have two children, Zoe and Eli.
