= Hunter Wise Commodities =

Hunter Wise Commodities, LLC was a privately held Spring Valley, Nevada-based wholesale precious metals trader and financier offering back office accounting services to its clients. The company also had offices in Irvine, California.

Formed in 2007, its wholly owned subsidiaries included Hunter Wise Credit, LLC, Hunter Wise Trading, LLC and Hunter Wise Services, LLC. Fred Jager was the chief executive officer and Harold Edward Martin was president and chief operating officer.

== Litigation ==
External videos
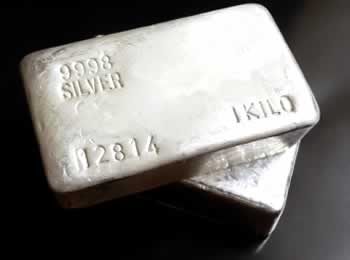
- True Fraud Stories: Hunter Wise’s Silvery Slope — SmartCheck.gov, CFTC, 5:16, June 26, 2017

Hunter Wise Commodities in September 2012 filed for a declaratory judgment in the U.S. District Court for the Northern District of Illinois for a finding that it was compliant with the Commodity Exchange Act (CEA), including amendments by the Dodd–Frank Wall Street Reform and Consumer Protection Act in 2011.

In December 2012, the Commodity Futures Trading Commission filed a complaint in the U.S. District Court for the Southern District of Florida alleging that Hunter Wise was engaging in unlawful activities.

In a December press release, Hunter Wise Commodities categorically denied the CFTC's allegations and contended that the CFTC overreached its jurisdiction and mischaracterized the nature of the transactions.

On February 25, 2013, the U.S. District Court for the Southern District of Florida froze all the assets of Hunter Wise Commodities. "The Court has set the trial of the CFTC's claims against the Defendants for a two-week period commencing on February 24, 2014."

On May 22, 2014, the Southern District Court in Florida found that Hunter Wise Commodities, three related companies, Fred Jager, and Harold Edward Martin Jr. were found to have "defrauded thousands of retail customers" and were ordered to pay $52.6 million in restitution and $55.4 million in civil penalties.
