= Caroline Pham =

American attorney

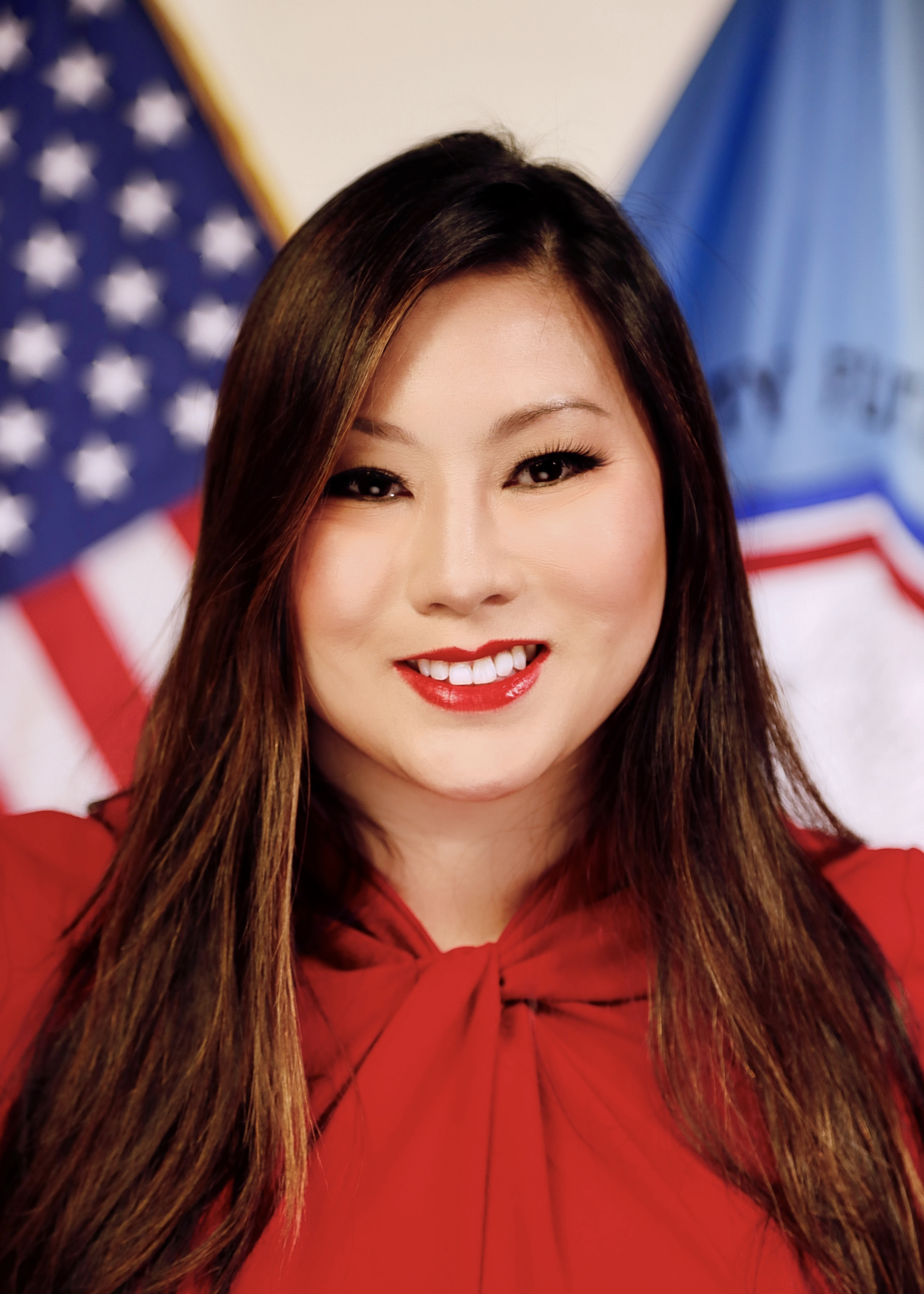
- Official portrait, 2022

Chair of the Commodity Futures Trading Commission
- Acting
- In office January 20, 2025 – December 22, 2025
- President: Donald Trump
- Preceded by: Rostin Behnam
- Succeeded by: Michael Selig

Commissioner of the Commodity Futures Trading Commission
- In office April 14, 2022 – December 22, 2025
- President: Joe Biden; Donald Trump
- Preceded by: Dawn DeBerry Stump
- Succeeded by: Vacant

Personal details
- Born: Modesto, California, U.S.
- Party: Republican
- Education: University of California, Los Angeles (BA); George Washington University (JD)

Caroline D. Pham is an American attorney who works as the chief legal officer and chief administrative officer at the cryptocurrency company MoonPay. Pham previously served as a commissioner of the Commodity Futures Trading Commission (CFTC) from 2022 to 2025.

She was designated acting chair of the CFTC by President Donald Trump on January 20, 2025, and remained in that role until the appointment of chair Michael Selig on December 22, 2025. Under her tenure, she relaxed regulatory enforcement against cryptocurrency firms and prediction markets. After leaving the CFTC, she took a position with the cryptocurrency company MoonPay.

== Early life and education ==
Pham was born in Modesto, California. Her Vietnamese-born parents were evacuated by helicopter from the U.S. Embassy in Saigon in April 1975. She earned a Bachelor of Arts degree from the University of California, Los Angeles in 2005 and a Juris Doctor from the George Washington University Law School.

== Career ==
From 2005 to 2008, Pham worked as an assistant at Sullivan & Cromwell. She was also a legal intern at the Commodity Futures Trading Commission, the Securities and Exchange Commission and a law clerk in the Office of the Comptroller of the Currency. She served as a judicial extern to former Chief Judge Loren A. Smith. From 2013 to 2014, she served as special counsel and policy advisor to CFTC Commissioner Scott D. O'Malia. Since 2014, she has worked in several positions at Citigroup.

In December 2021, President Joe Biden announced his intent to nominate Pham for a Republican commissioner spot on the bipartisan Commodity Futures Trading Commission. Her nomination was confirmed by the United States Senate on March 28, 2022, and she was sworn in on April 14.

On January 20, 2025, President Donald Trump designated Pham to be acting chair of the CFTC, replacing Rostin Behnam. In February 2025, Pham terminated the head of human resources at CFTC, who was conducting an investigation into allegations that Pham was creating a hostile workplace. In addition, she terminated other employees. In May 2025, Pham announced she planned to return to the private sector after a permanent chair was sworn in. On December 22, 2025, after the confirmation of chair Michael Selig, Pham left the CFTC to join cryptocurrency firm MoonPay as chief legal and administrative officer.

As chair of the CFTC, Pham eased regulatory enforcement against prediction markets and cryptocurrency companies. She pushed the CFTC to settle cases, including against the Seychelles-based cryptocurrency company KuCoin in March 2026, which had just prior entered into a lucrative business partnership with World Liberty Financial, which is owned by the Donald Trump family. Pham also launched investigations into senior CFTC officials who had worked on enforcement cases against cryptocurrency firms, which according to the New York Times, "[sent] a chill through the ranks."
