= J. Christopher Giancarlo =

American lawyer (born 1959)

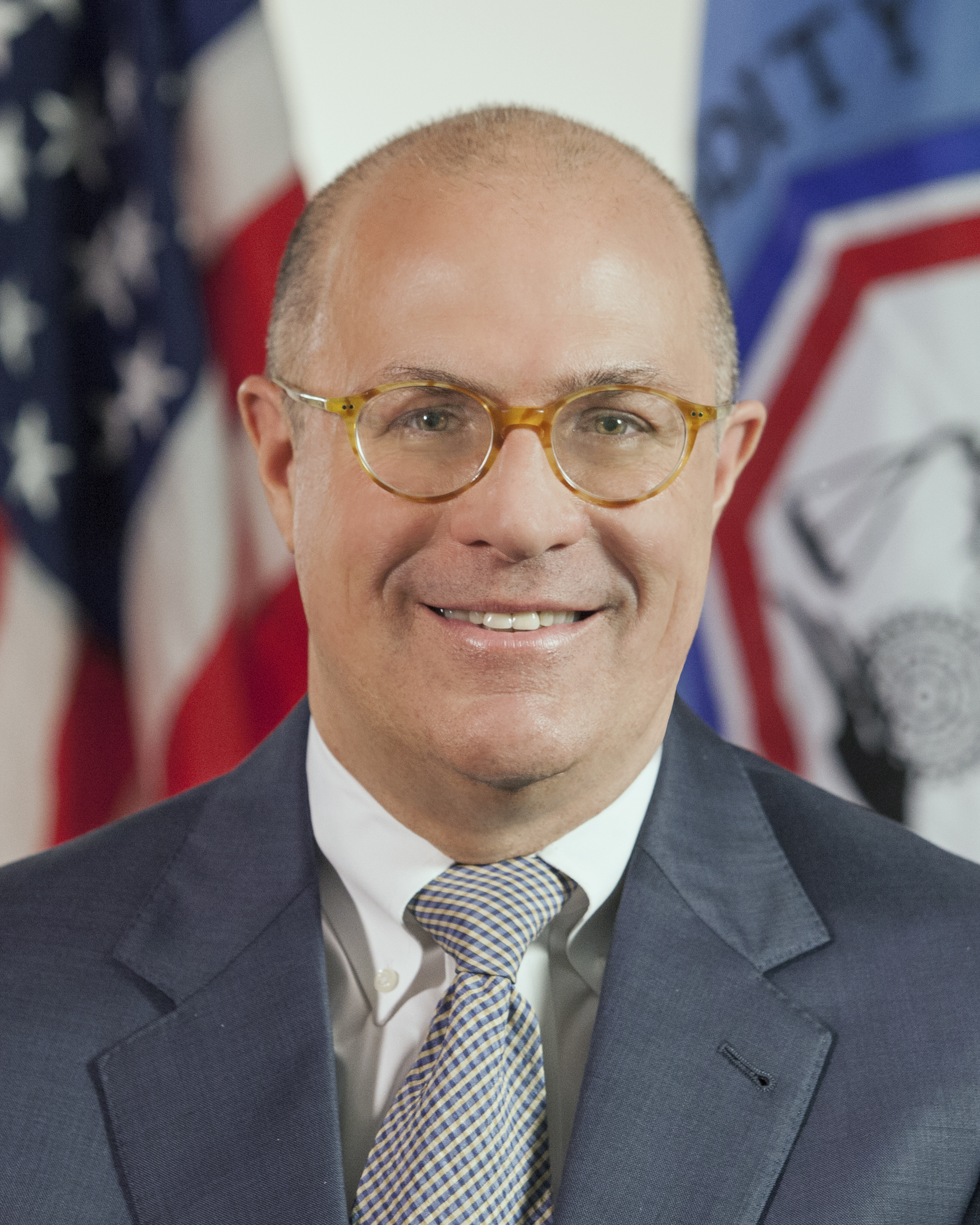
- Official portrait, 2014

13th Chairman of the Commodity Futures Trading Commission
- In office August 3, 2017 – July 15, 2019; Acting: January 20, 2017 – August 3, 2017
- President: Donald Trump
- Preceded by: Timothy Massad
- Succeeded by: Heath Tarbert

Commissioner of the Commodity Futures Trading Commission
- In office June 16, 2014 – July 15, 2019
- President: Barack Obama; Donald Trump
- Preceded by: Jill E. Sommers
- Succeeded by: Heath Tarbert

Personal details
- Born: 1959 (age 66–67) Jersey City, New Jersey, U.S.
- Party: Republican
- Education: Skidmore College; Vanderbilt University Law School

James Christopher Giancarlo (born May 12, 1959) is an American attorney and former business executive who served as 13th chairman of the United States Commodity Futures Trading Commission (CFTC). Giancarlo was sworn in as a CFTC commissioner on June 16, 2014, for a term expiring on April 13, 2019. Starting on January 20, 2017, with President Donald Trump's inauguration, Giancarlo began serving as acting chair of the CFTC. In March 2017, the president nominated Giancarlo to be full-time chair of the commission. Giancarlo was confirmed as chairman of the commission by the United States Senate on August 3, 2017. During his time as CFTC Chairman, JC Giancarlo served as a member of the U.S. Financial Stability Oversight Committee (FSOC), the President’s Working Group on Financial Markets, and the Executive Board of the International Organization of Securities Commissions (IOSCO).

Giancarlo is author of CryptoDad: The Fight for the Future of Money, an account of his oversight of the world’s first regulated market for Bitcoin derivatives and the coming digital network transformation of financial services.

== Early life and education ==
Giancarlo was born on May 12, 1959, in Jersey City, New Jersey, to a family of physicians, nurses, and small business owners. He has four brothers, including Charles Giancarlo, an entrepreneur and investor who is the chairman and CEO of data storage company Everpure, as well as a former senior executive of Cisco Systems and board chairman of Avaya.

Giancarlo was raised in Englewood, New Jersey, and received primary and secondary education at the Dwight-Englewood School from 1970 to 1977. He attended Skidmore College in Saratoga Springs, New York, where he graduated with college and Government Department Honors. At Skidmore, Giancarlo was a member of Phi Beta Kappa, of the Winter Term Scholarship Committee and a contributing editor to Politea magazine. In 1984, he received a Juris Doctor degree from the Vanderbilt University School of Law where he was an associate research editor at the Vanderbilt Journal of Transnational Law and President of the Law School's International Law Society. Since 1985, Giancarlo has been a member of the Bar of the State of New York.

== Career ==
=== Business ===
From 2001 to 2014, Giancarlo served as the executive vice president of GFI Group Inc., an intermediary in the global over-the-counter and listed markets that offers trading technologies and products to financial market participants (NYSE: GFIG). Giancarlo was responsible for GFI's strategic transactions and relationships, including mergers and acquisitions, equity finance, investment banking, strategy development, analyst and investor communications and government relations. During his tenure, Giancarlo directed GFI's initial public offering in 2005 and led the acquisition strategies of Trayport Limited and Amerex Brokers LLC and Starsupply LLC.

Prior to joining GFI, Giancarlo was executive vice president and U.S. legal counsel of Fenics Software. From September 1997 to April 2000, Giancarlo was a corporate partner in the New York law firm of Brown Raysman Millstein Felder and Steiner, where he advised technology businesses on corporate and finance transactions. He joined Brown Raysman from Giancarlo & Gleiberman, a law practice founded by Giancarlo in 1992 following his return from several years practicing law in London with the international firm of Curtis, Mallet-Prevost, Colt & Mosle.

Giancarlo was a founding board member and former chairman of the Wholesale Markets Brokers Association (Americas), and served as chair of three annual conferences on Swap Execution Facilities, SEFCON I October 4, 2010, SEFCON II October 3, 2011 and SEFCON III November 13, 2012 where he delivered opening and closing remarks. He was a member of the Leadership Board of the Center for Capital Markets Competitiveness of the United States Chamber of Commerce. He was also a founding co-editor-in-chief of eSecurities, Trading and Regulation on the Internet, (Leader Publications) and has written and spoken extensively on public policy, legal and other matters concerning technology and the financial markets.

Giancarlo has testified over 20 times before the U.S. Congress. In February 2011, Giancarlo testified before the U.S. House Financial Services Committee of the U.S. Congress on implementation of the Dodd-Frank Wall Street Reform and Consumer Protection Act ("Dodd-Frank Act"). In October of that same year, Giancarlo also testified before the House Committee on Agriculture on Legislative Proposals Amending Title VII of the Dodd-Frank Act. In December 2012, he testified once more, this time before the House Financial Services Subcommittee on Capital Markets and Government Sponsored Enterprises on "Challenges Facing the U.S. Capital Markets to Effectively Implement Title VII of the Dodd-Frank Act".

=== Government service ===
Giancarlo was nominated by President Barack Obama on August 1, 2013, to serve as a Commissioner of the Commodity Futures Trading Commission (CFTC). On March 6, 2014, Giancarlo testified on his nomination before the U.S. Senate Committee on Agriculture, Nutrition, and Forestry, which approved the nomination on April 8, 2014. The U.S. Senate confirmed his nomination by unanimous consent on June 3, 2014, for a term expiring April 13, 2019.

On April 14, 2015, Giancarlo testified before the U.S. House of Representatives, Committee on Agriculture Subcommittee on Commodity Exchanges, Energy, and Credit regarding commercial end-user concerns, derivatives trading position limits, CFTC swaps trading rules and the cross-border impact of U.S. derivatives regulation.

Having served as acting CFTC chair since President Trump's inauguration on January 20, 2017, Giancarlo was nominated by the president to be full-time chair of the commission on March 14, 2017, subject to confirmation by the Senate. He was confirmed by the U.S. Senate on August 3, 2017. His successor as commissioner and chairman, Heath Tarbert was confirmed by the Senate on June 5, 2019.

=== Cryptocurrency ===
Following service in the US government, Giancarlo took on several roles: senior counsel to the law firm Willkie Farr & Gallagher, chairman of Common Securitization Solutions LLC, a joint venture between Fannie Mae and Freddie Mac, senior advisor of social trading company eToro, and a member of the advisory board of the Chamber of Digital Commerce. Giancarlo currently serves as a non-executive director of Nomura Holdings, Inc., Digital Asset Holdings, and Paxos Trust Company He is also a senior adviser to capital markets technology provider Baton Systems and a former director of the American Financial Exchange (AFX).

Giancarlo is a blockchain technology advocate and contributor to the global discourse on cryptocurrencies and digital assets. He is the co-founder and chairman of the Digital Dollar Project, "a neutral, non-profit forum focused on exploring digital money innovations and preserving the role of the US Dollar in a world of decentralized and centralized sovereign and non-sovereign digital currency networks." and a former director of financial service company BlockFi.

Giancarlo was appointed to the rank of Chevalier in the National Order of Merit by French President Macron in recognition of his expertise in “cryptofinance.”

== Personal life ==
Giancarlo is married to Regina Marie Beyel and has three children. He is a former board chairman of the French American Academy and a former member of the borough of Haworth, New Jersey board of adjustment. Giancarlo plays banjo and guitar and is a former member and co-founder of the "Slacks," a north NJ music band. His banjo playing can be heard on the album "Grand Reveal" by British recording artist Mike Marlin that was released in April 2013. Giancarlo is a practicing Catholic.

Political offices
Preceded by Timothy Massad	Chairman of the Commodity Futures Trading Commission; 2017–2019	Succeeded by Heath Tarbert
