= CFTC Whistleblower Program =

Agency overview
- Formed: 2010
- Jurisdiction: Federal government of the United States
- Headquarters: Washington, D.C.
- Parent agency: Commodity Futures Trading Commission
- Website: www.whistleblower.gov

The Commodity Futures Trading Commission's Whistleblower Program was created with the 2010 passage of the Dodd–Frank Act. The program rewards individuals who report possible Commodity Exchange Act (CEA) violations. The program also extends anti-retaliation protections for whistleblowers who file claims.

Whistleblowers who voluntarily report Commodity Exchange Act violations and whose information leads to a successful enforcement action that result in monetary sanctions exceeding $1,000,000. Awards to whistleblowers are paid out of the Congress-established CFTC Consumer Protection Fund. The Fund is financed by money seized by individuals who violated the Commodity Exchange Act. As of October 2021, the CFTC Whistleblower Program has awarded $300 million in whistleblower awards since it issued the first award in 2014.

== History and operations ==
The Dodd-Frank Wall Street Reform and Consumer Act was passed in 2010 after the 2008 Great Recession. The Act aimed to reinforce financial regulation and empower the CFTC's authority to oversee the swaps market. The Dodd-Frank Act amended the Commodity Exchange Act's with adding Section 23, named the "Commodity Whistleblower Incentives and Protection." Section 23 and the rules and regulations the CFTC has issued to implement the section's provisions govern the Whistleblower Program. The section also sets out the rules and procedures prospective whistleblowers must follow to obtain an award. The Whistleblower Rules went into effect in October 2011 and were amended in July 2017.

According to the CFTC's 2021 annual report to Congress, the agency doled out 6 whistleblower awards that totaled over $3 million in the 2020 fiscal year, which ranged from October 1, 2020 through September 30, 2021. During the 2021 fiscal year, the CTFC Whistleblower Program issued 65 Final Orders addressing 74 whistleblower award applications and noted that numerous award recipients first made their disclosures to other agencies like the U.S. Securities and Exchange Commission.

All CFTC whistleblower awards are paid out of the Customer Protection Fund. On July 6, 2021, President Joe Biden signed emergency legislation into law that saved the CFTC Whistleblower Program from collapse. The program was on the brink of collapse because of a large whistleblower award that threatened to deplete the Customer Protection Fund. Thus, the emergency legislation addressed the crisis by creating a separate fund specifically for the CFTC's Office of the Whistleblower's operations. This new fund is separate from the fund out of which CFTC whistleblower awards are paid, ensuring that the Office of the Whistleblower can continue to function even if a whistleblower receives a large award.

The CFTC provides confidentiality and anti-retaliation protections to whistleblowers.

=== Notable awards ===
Date	Award Amount	Description
5/20/2014	$240,000	First whistleblower award given out by the CFTC, provided "valuable information about violations of the Commodity Exchange Act."
4/4/2016	More than $10 million	Award for the "key original information" they provided.
7/12/2018	$30 million	Received award for their original information they provided to the agency.
7/16/2018	Over $70,000	First CFTC whistleblower award to a foreign whistleblower.
8/2/2018	More $45 million	Multiple whistleblowers received this award.
9/27/2019	$7 million	The whistleblower's disclosure led to the agency finding a CEA violation.
6/9/2020	More than $6 million	The whistleblower provided "specific, credible and timely" information to the agency.
7/27/2020	$9 million	Received this award for their disclosures.
10/21/2021	Nearly $200 million	The whistleblower's disclosures led to an enforcement action at the CFTC as well as actions by another U.S. regulator and a foreign regulator. This is the largest award to a single whistleblower in the program's history.

== Violations ==
There are numerous violations on which individuals can blow the whistle to the CFTC. Below is a list of examples of violations that CFTC whistleblowers have blown the whistle on.

=== Corrupt practices ===
The CFTC states that the agency "will enforce the CEA provisions that encompass corrupt practices," which can include actions that "impact the prices in commodity markets that drive U.S. derivatives prices or that are used to manipulate benchmarks," "corrupt payments used to secure business in connection with regulated activities like trading, advising, or dealing in swaps or derivatives, paid out of funds investors believed were being used to invest," and "corrupt practices used to misappropriate material nonpublic information that traders would want to know." Other examples of corrupt practices include cases of bribes or kickbacks. In this section, the CFTC reminds readers that per the Whistleblower Rules, a whistleblower is defined as one or more individuals: thus, this excludes "a company or another entity" from the Rules' definition of "whistleblower." The CFTC provides instructions for individuals who want to report fraud in each individual section.

=== Spoofing ===
Spoofing is a practice in which a trader "places an order in a futures market with the intention to cancel the order prior to execution." The intended outcome of spoofing is to manipulate the appearance of supply or demand and lead other traders to make decisions in the spoofer's favor, and spoofing "is a federal crime punishable by up to 10 years' imprisonment per violation."

To blow the whistle on spoofing, an individual does not have to be working at the company they are blowing the whistle on: "victims of fraud and other market participants who observe misconduct committed by others may be best situated to identify spoofing and qualify as whistleblowers."

=== Bank Secrecy Act ===
The Financial Crimes Enforcement Network (FinCEN) regulations "pertaining to the BSA" require Futures Commission Merchants and Introducing Brokers to comply with the Bank Secrecy Act, which compels these entities to comply with a series of regulations. Individuals can be on the lookout for a variety of concerning behaviors, including: "Improper supervision and records violations," "Failure to diligently supervise officers’, employees’, and agents’ opening and handling of accounts," "Failure to protect customers and the markets from fraud and corruption," "Improper enforcement of trading limits assigned by regulators," "Inadequate construction of a customer identification program as part of the firm’s compliance program," and "Failure to file suspicious activity reports."

=== Insider trading ===
Section 6(c)(1) of the Commodity Exchange Act and CFTC Regulation 180.1 makes illegal, "among other things, trading on the basis of material nonpublic information (MNPI) in breach of a pre-existing duty or trading on the basis of MNPI that was obtained by fraud or deception. In addition, market participants are required to safeguard client or counterparty information in many circumstances, and failing to do so may violate CFTC Regulations 23.410, 155.3, or 155.4."

=== Foreign corrupt practices ===
Individuals can blow the whistle on CEA violations "connected to bribes of foreign government officials or similar conduct." The webpage states that companies and individuals who engage in practices that "seek to improperly influence foreign officials with personal payments or rewards" could be liable "for fraud, manipulation, false reporting, or a number of other types of violations under the CEA and Commission Regulations."

=== Digital assets and virtual currency ===
The IRS' definition of a virtual currency is a "digital representation of value that functions as a medium of exchange, a unit of account, and/or a store of value." According to the CFTC, virtual currencies qualify as commodities under the CEA. "When a virtual currency is used in a derivatives contract, or if there is fraud or manipulation involving a virtual currency traded in interstate commerce, CFTC enforcement of the CEA comes into play."

The CFTC lists some types of misconduct relating to virtual currency, including "Price manipulation (like pump-and-dump schemes) involving virtual currencies and other virtual assets," "Pre-arranged or wash trading of virtual currencies, or swaps or futures contracts based on virtual currencies," "Virtual currency futures or option contracts or swaps traded on an unregistered domestic platform or facility," "Certain schemes involving virtual currencies marketed to retail customers by unregistered persons, such as off-exchange leveraged, margined, or financed commodity transactions with persons, even without direct evidence of fraud or manipulation," and "Supervision failures or fraudulent conduct (e.g., creating or reporting fictitious trading) by virtual currency exchanges."

The CFTC reminds individuals that they "do not need to be an 'insider' (like an app developer or employee) to be a whistleblower. Victims of fraud and other market participants who observe misconduct committed by others may also qualify as whistleblowers."

== Filing a whistleblower complaint ==
Prospective CFTC whistleblowers should submit a Form TCR (Tip, Complaint, or Referral) after they identify a potential Commodity Exchange Act violation and they understand the anti-retaliation and confidentiality protections that the Whistleblower Rules offer. The CFTC Whistleblower Office will then confirm receipt in writing of the Form TCR and provide a confirmation number. The webpage states that because investigations are confidential, someone who submitted a Form TCR should not expect to receive updates on their complaint's status from the Whistleblower Office.

There are detailed requirements for prospective whistleblowers who want to make their disclosures anonymously. Whistleblowers can file anonymously with or without legal counsel; if a whistleblower who wishes to remain anonymous uses an attorney, the attorney can file the Form TCR to the CFTC on behalf of the whistleblower. However, when the agency decides to make a whistleblower award payment, the CFTC can require the whistleblower's attorney to confirm the whistleblower's identity.

== See also ==
- Department of Defense Whistleblower Program
- SEC Office of the Whistleblower
- IRS Whistleblower Office
