= Summer Mersinger =

American attorney and business executive

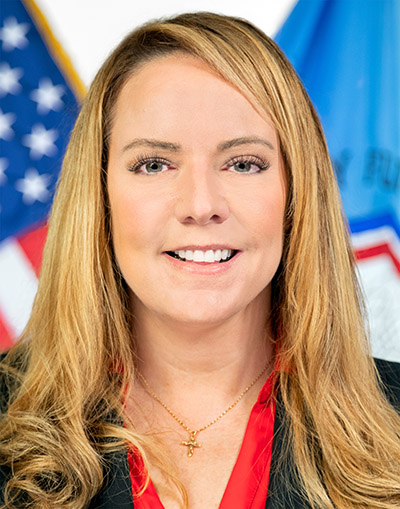

Chief Executive Officer of the Blockchain Association
- Incumbent
- Assumed office June 2025
- Preceded by: Kristin Smith

Commissioner of the Commodity Futures Trading Commission
- In office March 31, 2022 – May 31, 2025
- President: Joe Biden; Donald Trump
- Preceded by: Dan Berkovitz
- Succeeded by: Vacant

Personal details
- Education: University of Minnesota (BA); Catholic University of America (JD)

Summer Kristine Mersinger is an American attorney and business executive who serves as the chief executive officer of the Blockchain Association, a trade association representing the cryptocurrency and digital asset industry. She previously served as a commissioner of the Commodity Futures Trading Commission (CFTC) from 2022 to 2025.

== Education ==
Mersinger earned a Bachelor of Arts degree from the University of Minnesota and a Juris Doctor from the Columbus School of Law at the Catholic University of America.

== Career ==
=== Congressional and private sector roles ===
From 1999 to 2002, Mersinger worked as an executive assistant in the United States House of Representatives. She later joined the office of Senator John Thune, serving in several senior roles, including director of scheduling in 2004, executive director from 2004 to 2008, and deputy chief of staff from 2012 to 2020.

After leaving Thune's office, Mersinger served as chief of staff to CFTC Commissioner Dawn Stump. She also served as vice president of the Smith-Free Group and as director of government relations for Arent Fox.

=== Commodity Futures Trading Commission ===
In December 2021, President Joe Biden announced his intent to nominate Mersinger as a commissioner of the Commodity Futures Trading Commission.
