= Heath Tarbert =

American lawyer and government official (born 1976)

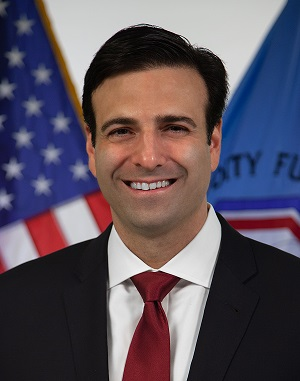
- Official portrait, 2019

14th Chairman of the Commodity Futures Trading Commission
- In office July 15, 2019 – January 21, 2021
- President: Donald Trump
- Preceded by: J. Christopher Giancarlo
- Succeeded by: Rostin Behnam

Commissioner of the Commodity Futures Trading Commission
- In office July 15, 2019 – March 5, 2021
- President: Donald Trump; Joe Biden
- Preceded by: J. Christopher Giancarlo
- Succeeded by: Christy Romero

Acting Under Secretary of the Treasury for International Affairs
- In office April 9, 2019 – July 15, 2019
- President: Donald Trump
- Preceded by: David Malpass
- Succeeded by: Brent McIntosh

Assistant Secretary of the Treasury for International Markets
- In office October 10, 2017 – July 15, 2019
- President: Donald Trump
- Preceded by: Marisa Lago
- Succeeded by: Mitchell Silk

Personal details
- Born: Heath Price Tarbert; July 15, 1976 (age 50) Baltimore, Maryland, U.S.
- Party: Republican
- Education: Mount St. Mary's University (BS); University of Pennsylvania (JD, SJD); St John's College, Oxford (MSt, DPhil)

Heath Price Tarbert (born July 15, 1976) is an American business leader, lawyer, and former government official who served as the 14th chairman of the Commodity Futures Trading Commission (CFTC) from 2019 to 2021. He previously served as Assistant Secretary of the Treasury for International Markets and Development and as acting Under Secretary of the Treasury for International Affairs. As of 2025, he is the president of Circle.

== Early life and education ==
Tarbert was born and raised in Baltimore, Maryland, where he attended Calvert Hall College High School, a private Catholic preparatory school. While in high school, he became an Eagle Scout.

The first in his family to attend university, Tarbert graduated from Mount St. Mary's University in 1998 with a Bachelor of Science in accounting and international business. He then attended the University of Pennsylvania Law School, where he was a senior editor of the University of Pennsylvania Law Review. He received a Juris Doctor in 2001 and a Doctor of Juridical Science in 2002.

Tarbert later obtained a Master of Studies and a Doctor of Philosophy in comparative law from St John's College, Oxford, in 2005, where he was a Thouron Scholar. His dissertation was titled, "Deal protection devices in stock-for-stock mergers: an Anglo-American analysis".

== Career ==
=== Early career ===
Tarbert began his legal career at the international law firm of Sullivan & Cromwell, working there from 2003 to 2005. He was a law clerk for Chief Judge Douglas H. Ginsburg of the U.S. Court of Appeals for the District of Columbia Circuit from 2005 to 2006. He worked as an attorney-adviser in the Office of Legal Counsel in the U.S. Department of Justice from 2006 to 2007, then clerked for justice Clarence Thomas of the U.S. Supreme Court from 2007 to 2008.

From 2008 to 2009, he served as Associate Counsel to the President of the United States, providing legal advice to the National Economic Council and the Council of Economic Advisers. In that role, he advised senior White House and Cabinet officials on issues related to the U.S. Government's response to the 2008 financial crisis.

From 2009 to 2010, Tarbert served as Special Counsel to the United States Senate Committee on Banking, Housing, and Urban Affairs. During his tenure, he participated in negotiations that eventually led to passage of the Dodd–Frank Wall Street Reform and Consumer Protection Act.

From 2010 to 2013, Tarbert was a senior counsel, and subsequently partner, at the law firm of Weil Gotshal & Manges, where he led the Financial Regulatory Reform Working Group.

In 2014, Tarbert joined Allen & Overy as partner and head of the law firm's U.S. bank regulatory group.

=== Other professional roles ===
Tarbert has served as the Chairman of the American Bar Association Subcommittee on Systemically Important Financial Institutions, Legal Adviser to the Systemic Risk Council, Senior Fellow at the Harvard Law School Program on International Financial Systems, deputy director of the Committee on Capital Markets Regulation, and a member of the Bretton Woods Committee. Tarbert is an elected member of the American Law Institute and a Life Member of the National Eagle Scout Association.

== U.S. Department of the Treasury ==
On April 4, 2017, the White House nominated Tarbert to become Assistant Secretary for International Markets and Development. He was confirmed by the U.S. Senate on September 27, 2017, by a vote of 87–8 and was sworn in on October 10, 2017. In April 2019, he was designated acting Under Secretary for International Affairs, following David Malpass becoming president of the World Bank Group.

As acting Under Secretary, Tarbert was charged with advancing U.S. interests in multilateral organizations on financial stability and regulatory issues, while promoting growth, negotiating trade agreements, and advocating for standards that level the playing field for U.S. firms. He led the U.S. delegation at the G-7 and G-20 Finance Ministers' and Central Bank Governors' Deputies Meetings. Tarbert was also a member of the Financial Stability Board (FSB) and served on the FSB's Steering Committee and all three of its Standing Committees. He co-chaired the U.S.-EU Financial Regulatory Forum and the U.S.-UK Financial Regulatory Working Group, both of which focus on enhancing financial regulatory cooperation with key counterparts and advancing U.S. economic interests.

Tarbert also served as policy chair of the Committee on Foreign Investment in the United States (CFIUS), which seeks to promote U.S. investments while protecting national security. In this role, Tarbert was a key architect of the Foreign Investment Risk Review Modernization Act (FIRRMA), which passed Congress with bipartisan support in August 2018.

=== International financial institutions ===
While at Treasury, Tarbert concurrently served as the acting U.S. Executive Director on the Board of the World Bank Group from 2017 to 2018, where he worked to negotiate a capital package that resulted in institutional reforms, including new financial discipline mechanisms and policies shifting a higher proportion of funding to poorer countries.

== Commodity Futures Trading Commission ==
On January 9, 2019, the White House nominated Tarbert to serve as the 14th chairman of the Commodity Futures Trading Commission. A coalition of agricultural associations endorsed Tarbert's nomination shortly before his confirmation hearing. He was then unanimously voice voted out of the Senate Agriculture Committee on April 1, 2019. On June 5, 2019, the United States Senate voted 85–9 to confirm Tarbert as a commissioner for a term ending April 13, 2024, and on the same day voted 84–9 to confirm him as chairman. Tarbert was sworn in on July 15, 2019, by Judge Douglas H. Ginsburg of the United States Court of Appeals for the District of Columbia Circuit.

In his role as chairman, Tarbert served as the CFTC's chief executive, overseeing the agency's approximately 1,000 employees and contractors across its offices in Washington, DC, Chicago, IL, New York, NY, and Kansas City, MO. As chairman, Tarbert also served as one of ten voting members of the Financial Stability Oversight Council (FSOC). On June 9, 2020, Tarbert was elected vice-chair of the board of the International Organization of Securities Commissions (IOSCO).

Upon taking office, Tarbert sought to position the agency as an advocate for Main Street interests and American free enterprise. Writing in a July 2019 op-ed in FoxBusiness.com, Tarbert said the agency "serves as a guardian of our free enterprise system" and that the markets the agency regulates should "serve the needs of everyday Americans." Tarbert has also reaffirmed the CFTC's historical commitment to agriculture by sponsoring the agency's Agricultural Advisory Committee. In a statement announcing his sponsorship, Tarbert said that, "America's farmers and ranchers are at the heart of the real economy and the markets we regulate." Tarbert worked to revise rules implementing the 2010 Dodd–Frank Wall Street Reform and Consumer Protection Act.

Tarbert presided over a historic period of activity at the agency as its chairman and chief executive. Under his leadership, the Commission held 20 open meetings—more than the previous seven years combined— approving 41 final rules. The agency brought more than 160 enforcement actions on Tarbert's watch, including an agency record 113 actions in fiscal year 2020. Tarbert's chairmanship was also noteworthy for its bipartisanship: of the 41 final rules and 21 proposed rules considered on his watch, 90 percent were advanced on a bipartisan basis. "The partisan divisions in Washington may run deep, but the Commission's historically collegial atmosphere has continued uninterrupted," Tarbert noted in December 2020.

Following Joe Biden's victory in the 2020 presidential election, Tarbert announced he would resign from the CFTC chairmanship in early 2021 but retain his seat on the commission. He officially stepped down as chairman on January 21, 2021, and was succeeded by Acting Chairman Rostin Behnam. Tarbert resigned from his position as a commissioner on March 5, 2021.

== Post-government career ==
Following his resignation as Commissioner of the CFTC, Citadel Securities announced on April 1, 2021, that it had hired Tarbert to serve as its Chief Legal Officer. Tarbert's hiring prompted some criticism of the so-called "revolving door" between government service and the financial services sector.

On September 15, 2022, Tarbert appeared as a bipartisan witness before the U.S. Senate Committee on Agriculture, Nutrition, and Forestry in hearings on the Digital Commodities Consumer Protection Act, faulting existing digital asset markets for "lack[ing] sound regulation" and advocating for adoption of the act on grounds that it "(1) addresses a critical gap in the CFTC's jurisdiction; (2) promotes U.S. leadership in digital assets; and (3) is designed to stand the test of time."

In 2024, Tarbert was appointed as a Distinguished Policy Fellow by the University of Pennsylvania Law School as part of the Leo Model Foundation Government and Public Affairs Initiative, designed to bring "leading policy and government experts [to] enrich the intellectual life of [Penn Carey Law] by sharing their expertise and perspectives on law and policy with students, faculty, and staff."

In June 2023, Circle announced that Tarbert would be joining their executive leadership team as Chief Legal Officer and Head of Corporate Affairs. Circle is a global financial technology company specializing in payments infrastructure and is the issuer of USD Coin (USDC), a digital stablecoin pegged to the United States dollar. Circle's Founder and CEO Jeremy Allaire stated that Tarbert would play a major role in the company's future growth, both in "building a bridge between traditional finance and Web3 " and increasing "the utility value of USDC worldwide." In February 2025, Jeremy Allaire announced via LinkedIn that Tarbert had been appointed as "the first President of Circle, helping us build a long lasting, transformative company at the most exciting time in our industry's history."

In August 2026, Tarbert attended the G20 finance minister and central bank governor meetings in Asheville, North Carolina.

On September 2, 2026, Tarbert testified before the House Financial Services Committee at a hearing on the U.S. dollar and digital-asset regulation. ITarbert urged implementation of the GENIUS Act and passage of the CLARITY Act. Tarbert advocated pursuit of a "dollar statecraft" strategy, arguing that the dollar's global role is an economic and national security asset that must be maintained through U.S. law, markets and institutional credibility.

== Personal life ==
Heath Tarbert is married to Kathryn "Kate" (Komp) Tarbert, whom he met while they both clerked for Judge Douglas H. Ginsburg from 2005 to 2006. Together they have two sons.

== See also ==
- List of law clerks for the tenth seat of the Supreme Court of the United States
