= Mitchell Silk =

American lawyer

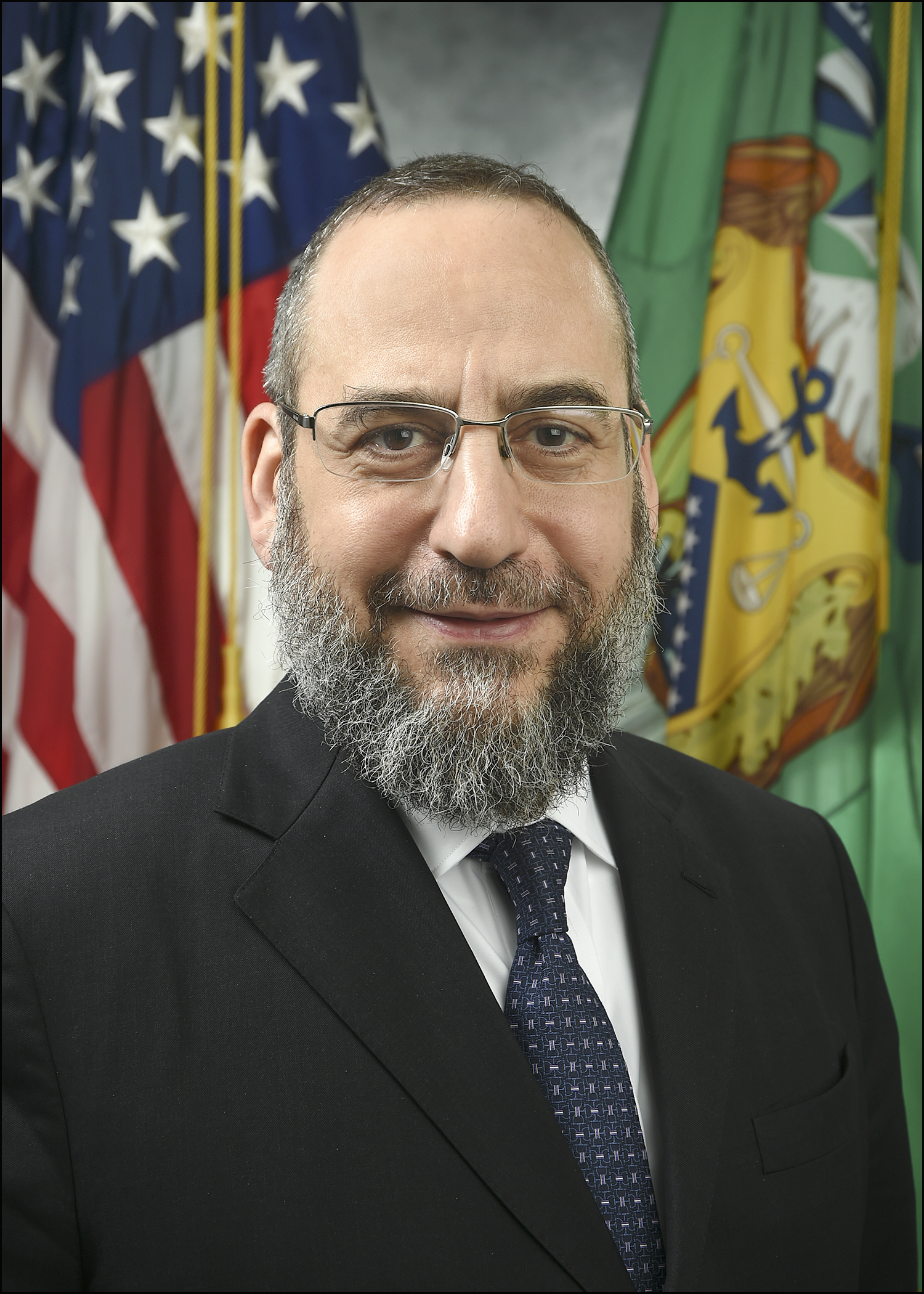

Assistant Secretary of the Treasury for International Markets
- In office July 15, 2019 – January 20, 2021; Acting: July 15, 2019 – April 21, 2020
- President: Donald Trump
- Preceded by: Heath Tarbert
- Succeeded by: Alexia Latortue

Personal details
- Born: Mitchell (Moyshe) Allen Silk; October 15, 1961 (age 64) Chicago
- Spouse: Yocheved
- Children: 8
- Education: University of Maryland; Beijing University; Georgetown University; National Taiwan Normal University; Middlebury College

Mitchell (Moyshe) Allen Silk is an American lawyer, author, and former government official who served as Assistant Secretary of the Treasury for International Markets under President Donald Trump. He is recognized as an expert in Chinese law and finance. From October 2017 to July 2019, served as Deputy Assistant Secretary of the Treasury.

Silk is the first Hasidic Jew to hold a senior position with a U.S. administration.

== Early life and education ==
Silk was born and grew up in Chicago. He was influenced by his grandparents who were immigrants to America from Eastern Europe, in particular, his maternal grandfather, a son and grandson of ritual scribes and followers of the first Rebbe of Nadvorna (today Nadvirna), Grand Rabbi Mordechai Leifer.

While in high school, Silk started working at a Chinese restaurant where he learned Cantonese. He then learned Mandarin at Middlebury College which he followed with a year at the National Taiwan Normal University. His fluency in Mandarin and Cantonese Chinese had a profound impact on his career and life.

He graduated from Georgetown University's Walsh School of Foreign Service with a Certificate in Asian Studies.

Silk earned a Juris Doctor from the University of Maryland Francis King Carey School of Law, where he served as assistant director for the law school's East Asian Legal Studies Program.

After graduation, Silk received a post-doctoral fellowship from the National Academy of Sciences which enabled him to study China's legal system and teach graduate classes in International Law at Shenzhen University, the Shanghai University of International Business and Economics (formerly Shanghai Institute to Foreign Trade), and Peking University from which he also holds a Certificate in Advanced Studies in Law.

== Legal career ==
Silk helped pioneer the field of China-related trade and investment law. Silk began his career as an associate at Hughes Hubbard & Reed on Wall Street (1987-1990), then at Graham & James, and Chadbourne & Parke in New York and Hong Kong. He spent over a decade in Hong Kong at Allen & Overy, heading the firm’s China Group and Asia Projects Group.

Independent legal directories, including The Legal 500, the largest legal referral guide in the world published by Legalease Ltd. and Euromoney’s AsiaLaw Leading Lawyers, recognized Silk as a leading lawyer in power, transportation, water, petrochemical, telecommunications and gas projects in China. He advised on many landmark project financings, including the 3,000MW Shandong Zhonghua Power Project, the Chengdu BOT Water Project, the $4.6 billion Shell Nanhai Petrochemical Refinery Project, the $14 billion, 4,100 km West-East Gas Pipeline, the $2.7 billion BP Shanghai Petrochemical Refinery, the $2.5 billion Dongshen Dongshen Water Supply Privatization Project, and the 600MW Jingyuan Phase II Power Project, the first Sino-US joint venture power project in China.

In 2005, Silk relocated back to New York to establish Allen & Overy's US China Practice, where he continued to advise on energy and infrastructure projects in the U.S., Latin America and the Caribbean, Asia and Africa, including the Southeast Northeast Interconnection Gas Pipeline GASENE , a 1,387 km pipeline in Brazil, Jamaica’s Highway 2000 which connects the north and south of the island, and the 794MW Mt. Signal Solar Project in Imperial Valley, CA.

He also acted as fund counsel on the structuring and formation of several large international infrastructure and real assets funds, and advised tens of foreign banks in their strategic expansion in the U.S. and their on-going operations, including cross-border financings and complex regulatory and corporate governance matters.

In January 2024, Silk was appointed Group General Counsel of the investment platform that houses Waterton Global Resources, the Cedarfield Group, and IJW Whiskey.

== Public service ==
In October 2017, Silk was appointed Deputy Assistant Secretary, International Affairs at the U.S. Department of the Treasury. He was the head of the Office of Investment, Energy and Infrastructure.

He became the acting Assistant Secretary of the Treasury for International Markets in July 2019. On September 19, 2019, President Trump formally nominated Silk to be Assistant Secretary of the Treasury for International Markets. A hearing on his nomination before the Senate Committee on Banking, Housing, and Urban Affairs was held on November 20, 2019. On April 21, 2020, the United States Senate confirmed his nomination by voice vote. Silk became the first Hasidic Jew to be confirmed to a senior U.S. administration position.

In this role, Silk advanced U.S. interests in multilateral organizations on financial stability and regulatory issues, while promoting growth, particularly through global energy and infrastructure financing agreements, and advocating for standards that level the playing field for U.S. firms. He was actively involved in the trade negotiations with China, the reform and oversight of the Overseas Private Investment Corporation and the Export-Import Bank of the United States, and the establishment of U.S. International Development Finance Corporation.

China

Silk was a senior negotiator in the talks that led to the U.S.-China Phase 1 Trade Agreement, focusing mainly on issues relating to financial services, energy and direct investment. He leveraged his China experience to formulate solutions to further the U.S. trade negotiating position with China, and address unfair global finance practices, including unfairly subsidized export trade and development credit subsidies. Senator Mike Crapo (then, Chairman, Senate Committee on Banking, Housing, and Urban Affairs) described Silk as “a leading expert in Chinese law and finance . . .. Since joining Treasury, Mr. Silk has been a key voice on trade negotiations, energy and infrastructure finance, export credit, and financial services.”

Energy and Infrastructure Finance

Silk designed and implemented a whole-of-government initiative using energy and infrastructure finance to foster U.S. and foreign partner economic growth and push back on China’s Belt and Road Initiative. The inter-agency program operated under the banner of America Crecé or The Americas Grow. The program was first introduced on February 2, 2018 by then Under Secretary of the Treasury for International Affairs David R. Malpass at the Center for Strategic and International Studies. The program was formally launched at the White House’s Indian Treaty Room on December 17, 2019, with speeches by then National Security Advisor Robert C. O'Brien, then Senior Advisor to the President Jared Kushner, then Secretary of the Treasury Steven T. Mnuchin, then Secretary of Commerce Wilbur Ross, then Chief Executive Officer of the U.S. International Development Finance Corporation Adam S. Boehler, and then Deputy Administrator to the U.S. Agency for International Development Bonnie Glick.

The United States entered into 15 energy and infrastructure finance frameworks under the America Crecé program with: Argentina, Bolivia, Brazil, Chile, Colombia, Dominican Republic, Ecuador, El Salvador, Guatemala, Guyana, Haiti, Honduras, Jamaica, Panama, Suriname and Uruguay.

Silk also designed and implemented a similar growth initiative in Asia that operated under the Asia EDGE program. The United States entered into seven energy and infrastructure finance frameworks under this programming, with: Japan, South Korea, Singapore, Taiwan, Vietnam, Indonesia and Thailand.

This programming resulted in a number of infrastructure projects in the Asia and the Western Hemisphere, the largest of which included the $3.5 billion DFC facility to the Government of Ecuador to assist six of its largest energy and infrastructure State-owned Enterprises, $1.15 billion Colon Gas-to-Power Project in Panama, the $1.4 billion Son My Gas-to-Power Project in Vietnam, and the $500 million 30 year refinancing for Panama’s energy utility ETESA. . As of January 2021, Asia EDGE had 57 active energy sector advocacy cases in the Indo-Pacific valued at $191.5 billion. The Trump 47 White House and State Department have signalled the launch of a new version of America Crecé, branded America Crecé 2.0.

Financial Services and Fintech

Silk served as the U.S. Treasury delegate to the Financial Stability Board’s Standing Committee on Assessment of Vulnerabilities, and also led the U.S. delegation to the U.S.-EU Financial Regulatory Forum, the U.S.-U.K. Financial Regulatory Working Group and the U.S.-India Financial Regulatory Dialogue. He was also a senior Treasury delegate to the U.S.-Japan Economic Dialogue and the annual Joint Economic Development Group with Israel. Silk also launched a series of Fintech dialogues with key international partners, including the U.S.-Israel Joint Fintech Dialogue, which took place in Israel in March 2020, and led the U.S.-U.K. Financial Innovation Partnership focused on Fintech issues.

CARES Act — Aviation Stimulus

Within days of the Corona virus spreading across the world, global passenger airline traffic dropped over 90% almost overnight. In order to avert a domino effect of airline bankruptcies, Title IV of the Coronavirus Aid, Relief and Economic Security (CARES) Act established payroll support payment (PSP1) and loan programs with allocations of $78 billion to assist certain aviation businesses and businesses critical to maintaining national security. The Consolidated Appropriations Act of 2021 increased PSP allocations by an additional $18 billion (PSP2) on December 27, 2020. Treasury awarded $24.9 billion in PSP1 payments to passenger air carriers, $827 million to cargo carriers, and $2.8 billion to certain contractors, and $14.8 billion to passenger air carriers and $895 million to certain contractors in PSP2 payments. Payroll support payments under this program have benefitted over 600,000 American workers. Silk served on the senior leadership team at Treasury that designed and administered this program.

== Published work ==
=== Books ===
Silk's book A Seat at the Table: An Inside Account of Trump's Economic Revolution was published by Bombardier Books in September 2025. The book presents Silk's journey as the first Chassidic Jew to be confirmed by the Senate for a senior Federal Government role, by recounting his role in the negotiations that led to the U.S.-China Phase I Trade Agreement, design of infrastructure finance frameworks in Latin America and Asia, representing the U.S. on finreg and fintech matters globally and crafting of the CARES Act programming to support the airlines during COVID.

He also published two books on Chinese environmental protection law titled: Environmental Law and Policy in the People's Republic of China and China's marine environmental protection law: The dragon creeping in murky waters. In addition, Silk published Taiwan Trade and Investment Law.

In 2021, Silk co-authored with Singaporean banker Seth Tan Dancing with Giants: A Lawyer and Banker Share Their Passion for Infrastructure Finance. The book chronicles their experiences over the last several decades working on some of the largest cross-border infrastructure projects on almost every continent and at the highest levels of government and corporate organizations.

In addition to his books on finance, Silk published a three volume, 2,000 page translation of the classic Kedushas Levi, written by Rabbi Levi Yitzchok of Berditchev, published by ArtScroll in September 2023. This is the first complete English translation of this work, which is the most widely studied Chassidic commentary on Torah—arranged according to the weekly Torah portion—and the Jewish holidays, expanding upon earlier Hasidic philosophy, as well as Talmud and Midrash.

=== Articles ===
Silk has written numerous articles addressing topics such as Chinese business expansion, Taiwan's investment law, China's state secrets law, post-Mao environmental protection, and infrastructure policy in the U.S.

== Personal life ==
Silk and his wife, Yocheved, reside in Borough Park, Brooklyn.

When sworn in as Deputy Assistant Secretary, Silk used an ancient Tikkun kor'im originally owned by Rebbe Mordechai of Nadvorna, from his grandfather's ancestral hometown.

He speaks five languages Cantonese Chinese, English, Mandarin Chinese, Hebrew, and Yiddish.
