= Darrin Williams =

American lawyer and politician

Member of the Community Development Advisory Board
- Incumbent
- Assumed office September 15, 2021
- President: Joe Biden

Speaker Pro Tempore of the Arkansas House of Representatives
- In office March 2012 – December 2012
- Speaker: Robert S. Moore Jr.

Member of the Arkansas House of Representatives from the 36th district
- In office January 2009 – January 2015
- Succeeded by: Charles Blake

Deputy Attorney General of Arkansas
- In office January 12, 1999 – January 3, 2003
- Governor: Mike Huckabee
- Attorney General: Mark Pryor

Personal details
- Born: Darrin Lavell Williams Danville, Arkansas, U.S.
- Party: Democratic
- Education: Hendrix College (BA); Vanderbilt University (JD); Georgetown University (LLM)

Darrin L. Williams is an American bank executive and former lawyer and politician from the U.S. state of Arkansas. A member of the Democratic Party, Williams is a former member of the Arkansas House of Representatives from District 36. He was term-limited and ineligible to run for re-election in 2014. He was House Speaker Pro Tempore for the term from March 2012 to December 2012.

Williams currently serves as CEO of Uplift Financial Development Corporation, formerly known as Southern Bancorp.

== Biography ==
Williams is from Little Rock, Arkansas. When Williams was a teenager, Bill Clinton, then the governor of Arkansas, appointed him to a school consolidation board. He attended Little Rock Central High School and was student body president in 1986. He then received his bachelor's degree from Hendrix College, his Master of Laws degree from Georgetown University Law Center, and his Juris Doctor from Vanderbilt University School of Law. During this time, he worked as an intern for Bill McCuen, the Secretary of State of Arkansas, and David Pryor, then a member of the United States Senate. Williams worked as a deputy director of the Democratic National Committee during the Clinton presidency.

Williams worked for Mark Pryor as his chief of staff, while Pryor was Attorney General of Arkansas, and as his deputy attorney general. He ran for the Arkansas House in Pulaski County for the first time in 2008. He was also a partner at the law firm Carney Williams Bates Pulliam & Bowman.

In September 2021, President Joe Biden appointed Williams to the Community Development Advisory Board.
