= Assistant Secretary of the Treasury for International Markets =

US global development finance minister

Assistant Secretary of the Treasury for International Trade and Development
- Flag of an Assistant Secretary of the Treasury
- Department of the Treasury
- Style: The Honorable
- Reports to: Under Secretary of the Treasury for International Affairs
- Nominator: President of the United States
- Constituting instrument: Foreign Investment and National Security Act of 2007
- Formation: July 26, 2007
- First holder: Neel Kashkari
- Salary: $155,500 (2010)
- Website: Official website

The Assistant Secretary of the Treasury for International Trade and Development is a senior official in the United States Department of the Treasury who heads a portfolio of the department's offices on international financial services issues, trade and investment policy, banking and securities, and U.S. relations with multilateral development banks.

The Assistant Secretary is appointed by the President and confirmed by the Senate.

== Overview ==
The Assistant Secretary heads the Office of International Trade and Development leads Treasury's work on trade and investment policy, international development finance, international energy and infrastructure finance, export credit policy, technical assistance, and U.S. engagement with the multilateral development banks. The Assistant Secretary also supports Treasury's board responsibilities at the U.S. International Development Finance Corporation and the Millennium Challenge Corporation.

The Assistant Secretary for International Trade and Development leads the development of policies on U.S. participation in the World Bank, and the other multilateral development banks (including the Inter-American Development Bank, the African Development Bank, the Asian Development Bank, and the European Bank for Reconstruction and Development).

The position was created on July 26, 2007, as part of the Foreign Investment and National Security Act of 2007. The position has changed names twice: it was originally called Assistant Secretary of the Treasury for International Affairs, then changed to Assistant Secretary of the Treasury for International Markets and Development, before settling on its current name.

== List of Assistant Secretaries of the Treasury for International Trade and Development ==
| Name | Assumed office | Left office | President appointed by | Secretary served under |
|---|---|---|---|---|
| Neel Kashkari | July 2008 | May 1, 2009 | George W. Bush | Henry Paulson |
| Marisa Lago | February 2010 | January 20, 2017 | Barack Obama | Timothy Geithner |
| Marisa Lago | February 2010 | January 20, 2017 | Barack Obama | Jack Lew |
| Heath Tarbert | October 10, 2017 | July 15, 2019 | Donald Trump | Steven Mnuchin |
| Mitchell Silk | July 15, 2019 | January 20, 2021 | Donald Trump | Steven Mnuchin |
| Alexia Latortue | January 13, 2022 | January 20, 2025 | Joe Biden | Janet Yellen |
| Francis Brooke | October 7, 2025 | September 22, 2026 | Donald Trump | Scott Bessent |

== See also ==
- Assistant Secretary of the Treasury
