= Brian Quintenz =

American financial manager and policy advisor

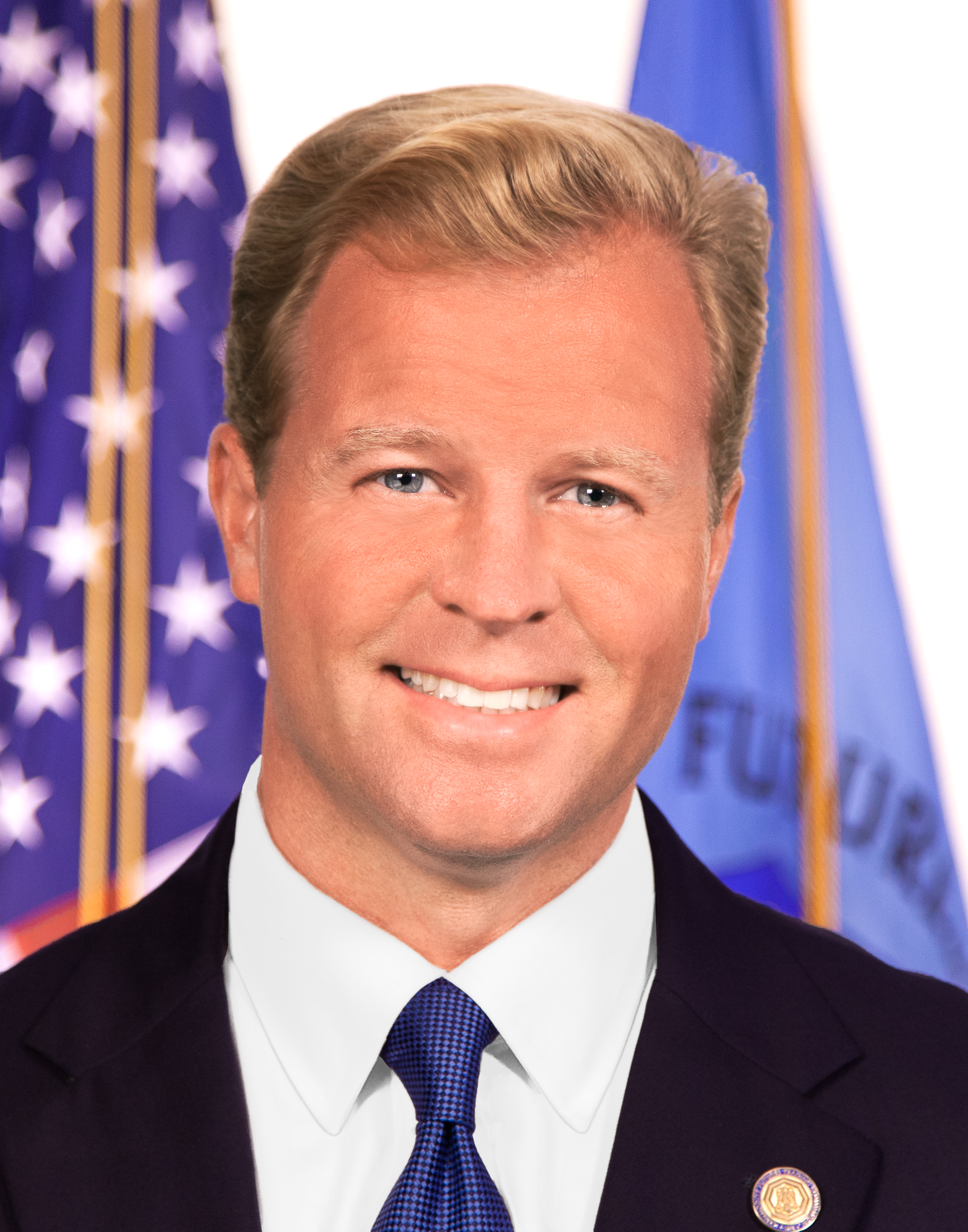
- Official portrait, 2017

Commissioner of the Commodity Futures Trading Commission
- In office August 15, 2017 – August 31, 2021
- President: Donald Trump; Joe Biden
- Preceded by: Scott D. O'Malia
- Succeeded by: Kristin N. Johnson

Personal details
- Party: Republican
- Education: Duke University (BA); Georgetown University (MBA)

Brian Quintenz is an American financial manager and policy advisor who served as commissioner of the U.S. Commodity Futures Trading Commission from 2017 to 2021. On February 11, 2025, President Trump nominated Quintenz to be CFTC Chairman. In September 2025, Quintenz's nomination was withdrawn by the White House.

== Education ==
Quintenz graduated from Duke University with a degree in public policy and received his MBA from Georgetown University McDonough School of Business.

== Career ==
Early in his career, Quintenz was a Rose International consultant and was a senior associate at Hill-Townsend Capital. He worked for U.S. Representative Deborah Pryce from 2001 to 2007, starting as a staff assistant before being promoted to senior policy advisor.

He is the former head of Saeculum Capital Management, an investment firm which he founded in 2013. In March 2016, Quintenz was nominated by President Barack Obama to be a commissioner on the Commodity Futures Trading Commission. His nomination, which required confirmation by the U.S. Senate, was not voted on before Congress ended its session for the year.

In early 2017, President Donald Trump withdrew Quintenz's nomination to the Commodity Futures Trading Commission before renominating him to serve the remainder of a five-year term expiring on April 13, 2020. Quintenz was confirmed by the U.S. Senate on August 3, 2017, and began service on the commission on August 15. He resigned effective August 31, 2021.

Quintenz joined Andreessen Horowitz's crypto venture team in December 2022 and was named its global head of policy.

In February 2025, President Donald Trump nominated Quintenz to serve as the next Chairman of the CFTC. His nomination was withdrawn on September 30, 2025, after opposition was expressed by Cameron and Tyler Winklevoss, who had regulatory dealings before the CFTC. The Winklevoss twins are two Donald Trump allies who entered into business partnerships with Trump's sons, Eric Trump and Donald Trump Jr.
