= Alexia Latortue =

American government official

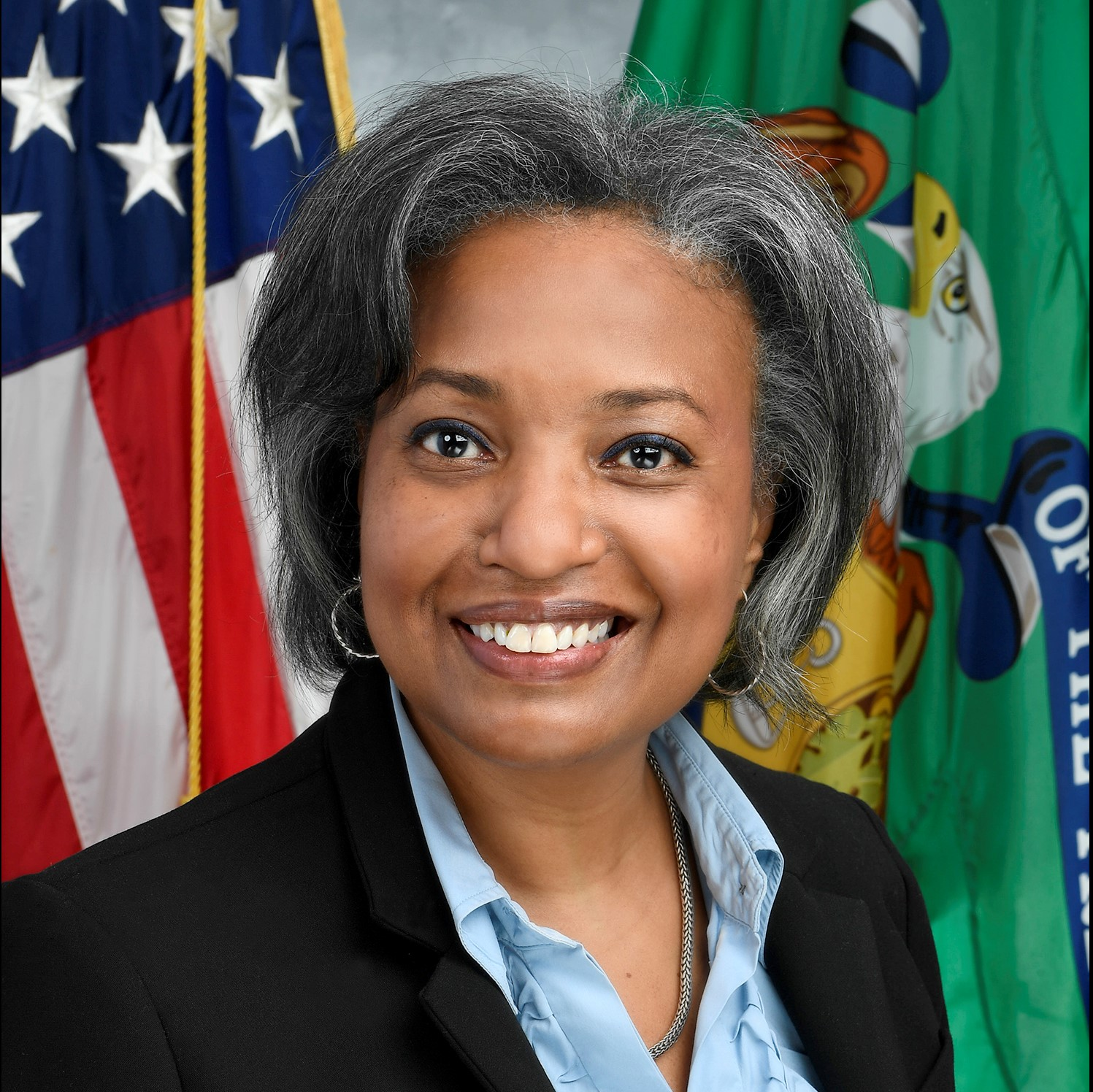

Assistant Secretary of the Treasury for International Markets
- In office January 13, 2022 – January 20, 2025
- President: Joe Biden
- Preceded by: Mitchell Silk
- Succeeded by: Francis Brooke

Personal details
- Relations: Gérard Latortue (father)
- Education: Georgetown University (BS); Tufts University (MA)

Alexia Marie Gabrielle Latortue is an American development official who served as the assistant secretary of the treasury for international markets in the Biden administration from 2022 to 2025.

== Early life and education ==
Latortue was raised in Puerto Rico, West Africa, and Austria. Her father, Gérard Latortue, served as the prime minister of Haiti from 2004 to 2006 after the 2004 Haitian coup d'état. She earned a Bachelor of Science degree from Georgetown University and a Master of Arts from the Fletcher School at Tufts University.

== Career ==
From 1997 to 2002, Latortue served as a development specialist for Development Alternatives Incorporated. From 2003 to 2013, she was the deputy CEO of the Consultative Group to Assist the Poor. In 2013, she joined the United States Department of the Treasury, serving as principal deputy assistant secretary for international development policy. From 2017 to 2021, she served as the managing director for corporate strategy at the European Bank for Reconstruction and Development. She has served as deputy CEO of the Millennium Challenge Corporation since March 2021.

=== Biden administration ===
On August 6, 2021, President Joe Biden nominated Latortue to be an assistant secretary of the treasury for international markets within the United States Department of the Treasury. The Senate Banking Committee held hearings on her nomination on September 21, 2021. Latortue was favorably reported out of the committee on October 5, 2021. The entire Senate confirmed Latortue's nomination by voice vote on December 18, 2021.

== See also ==
- Department of the Treasury appointments by Joe Biden
