= Jill E. Sommers =

American government official (born c. 1969)

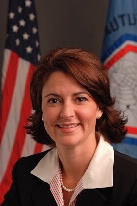
- Official portrait, 2007

Commissioner of the Commodity Futures Trading Commission
- In office August 8, 2007 – July 8, 2013
- President: George W. Bush; Barack Obama

Personal details
- Born: c. 1969
- Party: Republican
- Spouse: Mike Sommers
- Education: University of Kansas

Jill E. Sommers is a former commissioner of the Commodity Futures Trading Commission. She was sworn into office on August 8, 2007 to a term that expired April 13, 2009. She was nominated on July 20, 2009 by President Barack Obama to serve a five-year second term, and confirmed by the United States Senate on October 8, 2009.

== Career ==
=== Early career and derivatives industry (1991–2007) ===
Sommers began her career in Washington, D.C., in 1991 on the staff of Senator Robert J. Dole (R-KS), working in various legislative capacities until 1995. Following her time on Capitol Hill, she worked as a legislative aide for two Washington consulting firms specializing in agricultural and commodity issues, Clark & Muldoon, P.C., and Taggart and Associates.

In 1998, Sommers transitioned into financial market regulation, joining the Chicago Mercantile Exchange (CME). She served in its Washington government affairs office and rose to become Managing Director of Regulatory Affairs, a position she held until 2004. During her tenure in the position, she oversaw legislative and regulatory strategy, including work surrounding the Commodity Futures Modernization Act of 2000. From 2005 to 2006, she served as Policy Director and Head of Government Affairs for the International Swaps and Derivatives Association (ISDA).

=== Commodity Futures Trading Commission (2007–2013) ===
Nominated by President George W. Bush, Sommers was sworn in as a Commissioner of the CFTC on August 8, 2007, to fill a term that would expire in April 2009. President Barack Obama subsequently nominated her for a full five-year second term in July 2009, and was confirmed by the Senate on October 8, 2009.

During her tenure at the CFTC, Sommers participated in rulemaking under Title VII of the Dodd–Frank Wall Street Reform and Consumer Protection Act and oversaw the agency's inquiry into the collapse of MF Global following Chairman Gary Gensler's recusal. She also held two concurrent interagency and advisory leadership roles:

- Global Markets Advisory Committee (GMAC): Appointed on February 4, 2008, to serve as chairman and designated federal official of the committee, which advises the Commission on regulatory challenges facing global exchanges, firms, and market users.
- Financial Literacy and Education Commission: Served as the CFTC's official designee to the Treasury-chaired commission.

In January 2013, Sommers announced her resignation ahead of the expiration of her term, formally stepping down from the Commission on July 8, 2013.

=== Private sector consulting and corporate governance (2013–present) ===
Following her departure from federal service, Sommers returned to the private sector as a regulatory consultant and corporate director across traditional derivatives exchanges, proprietary trading firms, and digital asset infrastructure:

- Regulatory consulting: In May 2014, Sommers joined Patomak Global Partners, a financial services consultancy, as a Senior Advisor. She was promoted to Chair of the firm's Derivatives Practice Group in February 2023, serving at the firm until February 2025 before continuing independent advisory work as principal of Jill Sommers LLC.
- Exchange and market governance: Shortly after leaving the CFTC, she joined the board of BATS Global Markets (later Cboe Options, Futures Exchange, and SEF) in August 2013, serving until August 2022, and sat on the board of directors of Cboe Global Markets from May 2018 to June 2022. She also served on the boards of the National Futures Association (NFA) and proprietary trading firm Allston Holdings LLC (beginning in July 2014).
- Digital assets and recent appointments: Between August 2022 and January 2026, Sommers served as an independent director on the board of LedgerX (later rebranded as MIAXdx following its acquisition by Miami International Holdings). She joined the boards of MIAX Futures (Minneapolis Grain Exchange) in February 2024, IMC Trading in January 2025, Bloomberg SEF in April 2025, Canton Strategic Holdings, Inc. (formerly Tharimmune, Inc.) in February 2026, and the parent board of Miami International Holdings (MIAX) in March 2026. She was also appointed Lead Independent Trustee of Robinhood Ventures Fund I upon its inception in 2026.
- Public advisory and nonprofit boards: In 2024, she was appointed to the U.S. Department of the Treasury's Financial Research Advisory Committee (FRAC). She has also served on the boards of the Ethics & Compliance Initiative and the literacy nonprofit Everybody Wins! D.C.

== Personal information ==
A native of Fort Scott, Kansas, Sommers holds a bachelor of arts degree from the University of Kansas. Her husband, Mike Sommers, is president and CEO of the American Petroleum Institute and former chief of staff to Speaker of the United States House of Representatives John Boehner.
