= Ron Borzekowski =

American economist

Director of the Office of Financial Research
- Nominee
- Assuming office TBA
- President: Joe Biden
- Succeeding: James Martin (acting)

Personal details
- Education: Stanford University (BA, PhD); Harvard University (MPP)

Ron Borzekowski is an American economist who is the nominee to serve as director of the Office of Financial Research (OFR) in the United States Department of the Treasury.

== Education ==
Borzekowski earned a Bachelor of Arts in political science and mathematics from Stanford University, a Master of Public Policy from the Harvard Kennedy School, and a PhD in economics from Stanford University.

== Career ==
From 2009 to 2011, Borzekowski served as a senior economist for the Federal Reserve Board of Governors. From 2010 to 2011, he served as a researcher at the Financial Crisis Inquiry Commission.

Borzekowski worked at the Consumer Financial Protection Bureau (CFPB) from 2011 to 2019, serving as a supervisory economist, deputy assistant director for research, and assistant director for research.

From 2019 to 2022, Borzekowski was the director of Amazon Web Services (AWS) for economics. In June 2022, he joined Yale University as director of the school's newly created Data-Intensive Social Science Center.

In 2023, he was nominated to serve as director of the Department of the Treasury's Office of Financial Research.
