= United States Commodity Futures Trading Commission =

Government agency

- Seal

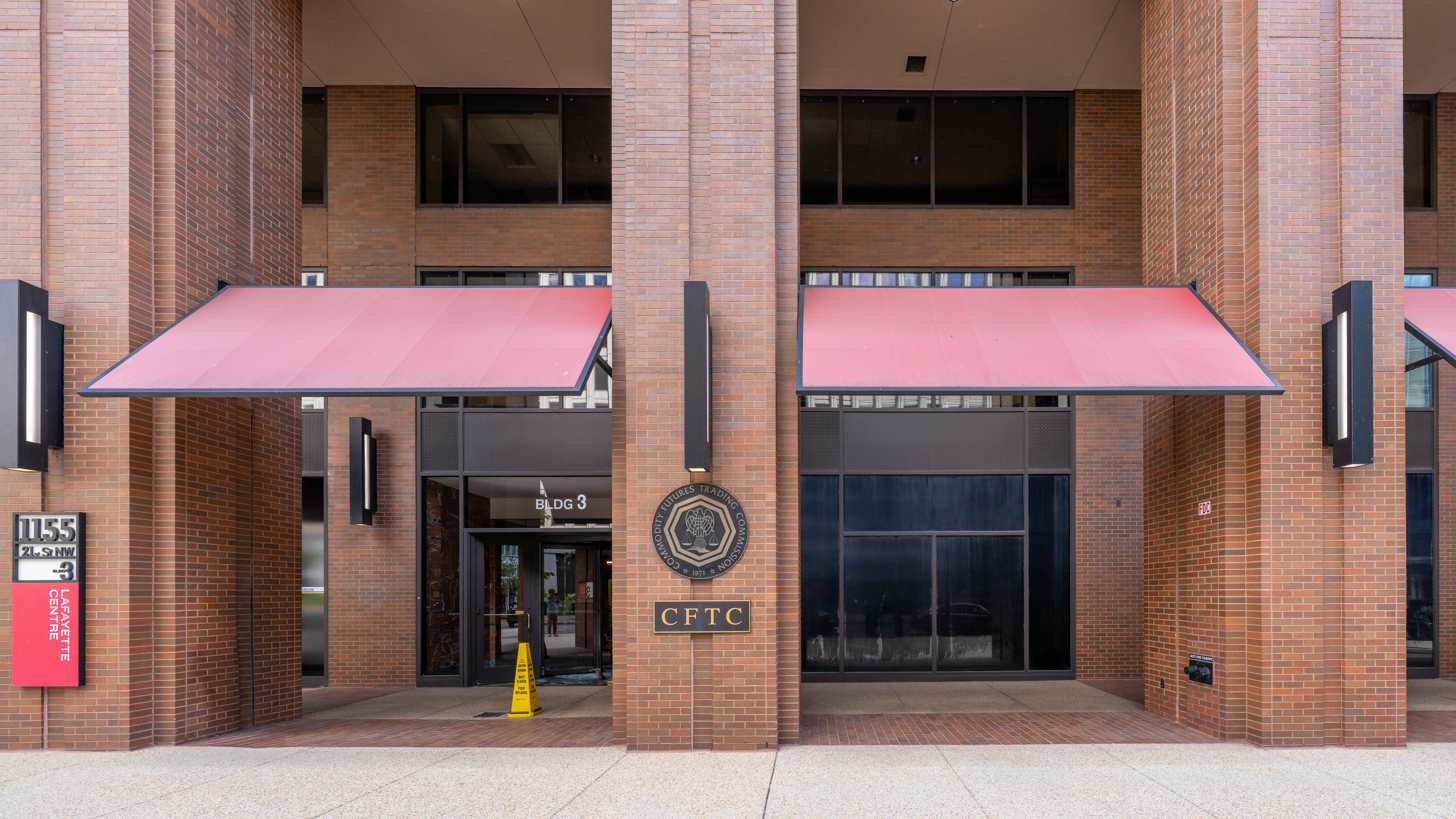
- Entrance to Headquarters in Washington, D.C.

Agency overview
- Formed: October 23, 1974
- Preceding agency: Commodity Exchange Authority
- Jurisdiction: Federal government of the United States
- Headquarters: 1155 21st Street, NW, Washington, D.C.
- Employees: 550 (2026)
- Agency executive: Michael Selig, Chairman
- Website: cftc.gov

The United States Commodity Futures Trading Commission (CFTC) is an independent agency of the United States federal government. Created in 1974, the commission regulates the United States derivatives markets, which includes futures, swaps, and certain kinds of options.

The Commodity Exchange Act (CEA), 7 U.S.C. § 1 et seq., prohibits fraudulent conduct in the trading of futures, swaps, and other derivatives. The stated mission of the CFTC is to promote the integrity, resilience, and vibrancy of the U.S. derivatives markets through sound regulation. After the 2008 financial crisis and since 2010 with the Dodd–Frank Wall Street Reform and Consumer Protection Act, the CFTC has been transitioning to bring more transparency and sound regulation to the multitrillion-dollar swaps market.

The agency was accused during the second Trump administration of weak regulation and even obstructing investigations into prediction markets and cryptocurrency businesses, two industries closely tied with the Trump family businesses. The reporting suggested that the agency had been made ineffective.

== History ==
Futures contracts for agricultural commodities have been traded in the U.S. for more than 150 years and have been under federal regulation since the 1920s. The Grain Futures Act of 1922 set the basic authority and was changed by the Commodity Exchange Act of 1936 (7 U.S.C. 1 et seq.).

Since the 1970s, trading in futures contracts has rapidly expanded beyond traditional physical and agricultural commodities into a vast array of financial instruments, including foreign currencies, U.S. and foreign government securities, and U.S. and foreign stock indices.

Congress created the CFTC in 1974 as an independent federal regulatory agency. The Commodity Futures Trading Commission Act of 1974 (P.L. 93-463) created the CFTC to replace the U.S. Department of Agriculture's Commodity Exchange Authority. The Act made extensive changes to the Commodity Exchange Act (CEA) of 1936, which itself amended the original Grain Futures Act of 1922. (7 U.S.C. 1 et seq.). In 1975, the first members were selected, and William T. Bagley became its first chairman.

The CFTC's mandate was renewed and expanded in December 2000 when Congress passed the Commodity Futures Modernization Act of 2000, which instructed the Securities and Exchange Commission (SEC) and the CFTC to develop a joint regulatory regime for single-stock futures, the products of which began trading in November 2002.

In 2010, the Dodd–Frank Wall Street Reform and Consumer Protection Act expanded the CFTC's regulatory authority into the swaps markets. The swaps markets currently have a notional value of more than $400 trillion.

The CFTC had 760 employees at its peak in 2015, but approximately 550 by March 2026.

Under the second Donald Trump administration, the CFTC workforce was cut by a quarter by April 2026. The agency was at its smallest size in 15 years. These cuts happened amid major controversies surrounding suspected insider trading on betting markets (such as Kalshi and Polymarket), as well as suspicious trades related to world politics; issues that the CFTC would be involved in regulating. The CFTC sharply curtailed regulatory enforcement against cryptocurrency companies and prediction markets. Within the first two years of the second Trump administration, the CFTC announced no new enforcement cases against major cryptocurrency firms, which stands in contrast to the more than 80 cases pursued by the CFTC under the Joe Biden administration. The lax enforcement of cryptocurrency firms and predictions took place under the leadership of CFTC chair Caroline Pham and CFTC senior counsel Brigitte Weyls, both of whom immediately went to work for cryptocurrency companies and prediction markets after leaving the CFTC. According to a May 2026 report in The New York Times, two officials who raised questions about three regulated prediction market companies' ties to the Trump family's business empire were placed on leave, barred from their offices and placed under internal investigation. Three other officials trying to enforce cryptocurrency laws were also removed from office. The Times' reporting concluded that the agency was being "steamrolled by industries it regulates".

== Regulated markets ==
The CFTC oversees the derivatives markets by encouraging their competitiveness and efficiency, ensuring their integrity, protecting market participants against manipulation, abusive trading practices, fraud, and ensuring the financial integrity of the clearing process. The CFTC generally does not directly regulate the safety and soundness of individual firms, with the exception of newly regulated swap dealers and major swap participants, for whom it sets capital standards pursuant to Dodd–Frank. Through oversight, the CFTC enables the derivatives markets to serve the function of price discovery and offsetting price risk.

As of 2014 the CFTC oversees 'designated contract markets' (DCMs) or exchanges, swap execution facilities (SEFs), derivatives clearing organizations, swap data repositories (SDRs), swap dealers, futures commission merchants, commodity pool operators and other intermediaries. The CFTC coordinates its work with foreign regulators, such as its UK counterpart, the Financial Conduct Authority, which supervises the London Metal Exchange.

=== Over-the-counter derivatives ===
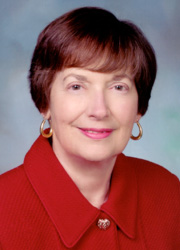
Brooksley Born

In 1998 CFTC chairperson Brooksley E. Born lobbied Congress and the President to give the CFTC oversight of 'off-exchange markets' for over-the-counter (OTC) derivatives in addition to its existing oversight of exchange-traded derivatives, but her warnings were opposed by other regulators.

Two actions by the CFTC in 1998 led some market participants to express concerns that the CFTC might modify the "Swap Exemption" and attempt to impose new regulations on the swaps market. First, in a February 1998 comment letter addressing the SEC's "broker-dealer lite" proposal, the CFTC stated that the SEC's proposal would create the potential for conflict with the Commodity Exchange Act (CEA) to the extent that certain OTC derivative instruments fall within the ambit of the CEA and are subject to the exclusive statutory authority of the CFTC.

In May 1998 the CFTC issued a 'concept release' requesting comment on whether regulation of OTC derivatives markets was appropriate and, if so, what form such regulation should take. Legislation enacted in 1999 at the request of the US Treasury, the Federal Reserve Board, and the SEC limited the CFTC's rulemaking authority with respect to swaps and hybrid instruments until March 30, 1999, and froze the pre-existing legal status of swap agreements and hybrid instruments entered into in reliance on the 'Swap Exemption', the 'Hybrid Instrument Rule', the 'Swap Policy Statement, or the 'Hybrid Interpretation'. The text of that act read: "...the Commission may not propose or issue any rule or regulation, or issue any interpretation or policy statement, that restricts or regulates activity in a qualifying hybrid instrument or swap agreement". Shortly after Congress had passed this legislation prohibiting CFTC from regulating derivatives, Born resigned. She later commented the failure of Long-Term Capital Management and the subsequent bailout as being indicative what she had been trying to prevent. (Note: Born was the focus of an October 2009 Frontline documentary titled "The Warning" and was also chronicled in the documentary Inside Job. The two films recount her attempts to investigate and regulate the OTC derivatives market (PBS Frontline "The Warning"))

=== Regulating digital currencies ===
In March 2014 the CFTC acknowledged it was considering the regulation of Bitcoin. The CFTC has since taken the position that Bitcoin is a commodity under the CEA. In October 2019, former CFTC Chairman Heath Tarbert, now Chief Legal Officer of Citadel Securities, declared that ether was also a commodity under the CEA.

In 2015, the CFTC ruled that for purposes of trading, cryptocurrencies were legally classified as commodities. However, in view of market volatility and other factors, the CFTC noted several risks associated with trading virtual currencies. In 2017, the CFTC cited the US SEC's warning against digital token sales and initial coin offerings (ICOs) that can "improperly entice investors with promises of high returns". In recent years, the CFTC has expanded its efforts to civilly prosecute fraud and misappropriation in the digital asset markets.

In November 2026 the New York Times reported career CFTC officials had considered an investigation into the Trump memecoin for possible fraud, but dropped the matter after concluding that then-agency chair Caroline Pham would not have approved the necessary subpoenas.

=== History and regulation of prediction markets (2020-2026) ===
In the early 2020s, the CFTC's regulatory scope underwent a significant transformation as prediction markets transitioned from niche academic platforms to mainstream financial venues. This era was defined by the rapid growth of "event contracts" derivatives that allow retail participants to trade on the outcome of real world events ranging from elections to sporting results.

=== Emergence of Kalshi and Polymarket ===
The modern era of consumer prediction markets began with the launch of Kalshi in 2021, which became the first "Designated Contract Market" (DCM) dedicated to event contracts. Unlike earlier platforms like PredictIt, which operated under restrictive "no-action" letters for academic purposes, Kalshi sought full federal registration to offer legally cleared contracts to the general public.

Concurrently, Polymarket, a decentralized platform based on the Polygon network, gained massive global traction. In January 2022, the CFTC issued a landmark enforcement action against Polymarket, fining the company $1.4 million and ordering it to wind down its U.S. operations for failing to register as a DCM. This forced Polymarket to "geo-block" U.S. users for nearly four years, even as it became the world's largest prediction market by volume, processing over $20 billion in cumulative trades by late 2025.

=== Expansion of CFTC oversight and legal challenges ===
Between 2023 and 2025, the CFTC significantly expanded its oversight, though its authority was frequently challenged in federal court. In 2023, the Commission attempted to block Kalshi from offering contracts on U.S. congressional control, arguing that such contracts constituted "gaming" and were contrary to the public interest. However, in a 2024 ruling in KalshiEX LLC v. CFTC, the U.S. District Court for the District of Columbia ruled that the CFTC had exceeded its statutory authority, holding that political events did not inherently constitute "gaming" under the Commodity Exchange Act.

Following this victory, prediction markets expanded aggressively into sports betting, climate change, and economic indicators. By late 2025, the CFTC shifted toward a "deregulatory pivot" under new leadership, dropping its appeal in the Kalshi case and clearing the way for Polymarket to re-enter the U.S. market through a registered intermediary.

=== Growth and institutional adoption ===
The prediction market sector grew over 130-fold between 2024 and 2025, with monthly volumes reaching $13 billion by the end of 2025. Major financial firms including Robinhood, Webull, and Interactive Brokers integrated Kalshi's event contracts into their platforms, making prediction trading as accessible to retail investors as traditional stock trading.

Despite this growth, the CFTC remains locked in jurisdictional disputes with state regulators. While federal courts in Nevada and New Jersey have ruled that the CFTC has "exclusive jurisdiction" over DCM event contracts, other states like Maryland and Massachusetts have secured court orders to block sports-related trading, alleging violations of state gambling laws.

In May 2026, the CFTC under the second Donald Trump administration filed a lawsuit to stop Minnesota from implementing a ban on prediction markets.

== Organization ==
Based in Washington, D.C., the CFTC maintains regional offices in Chicago, New York and Kansas City, Missouri. The Commission consists of five Commissioners appointed by the President of the United States to serve staggered five-year terms. The commissioners may continue to serve until their successor is confirmed, but not beyond the expiration of the next session of Congress subsequent to the expiration their term. The President, with the consent of the United States Senate, designates one of the commissioners to serve as chairman. No more than three commissioners at any one time may be from the same political party.

=== Current commissioners ===
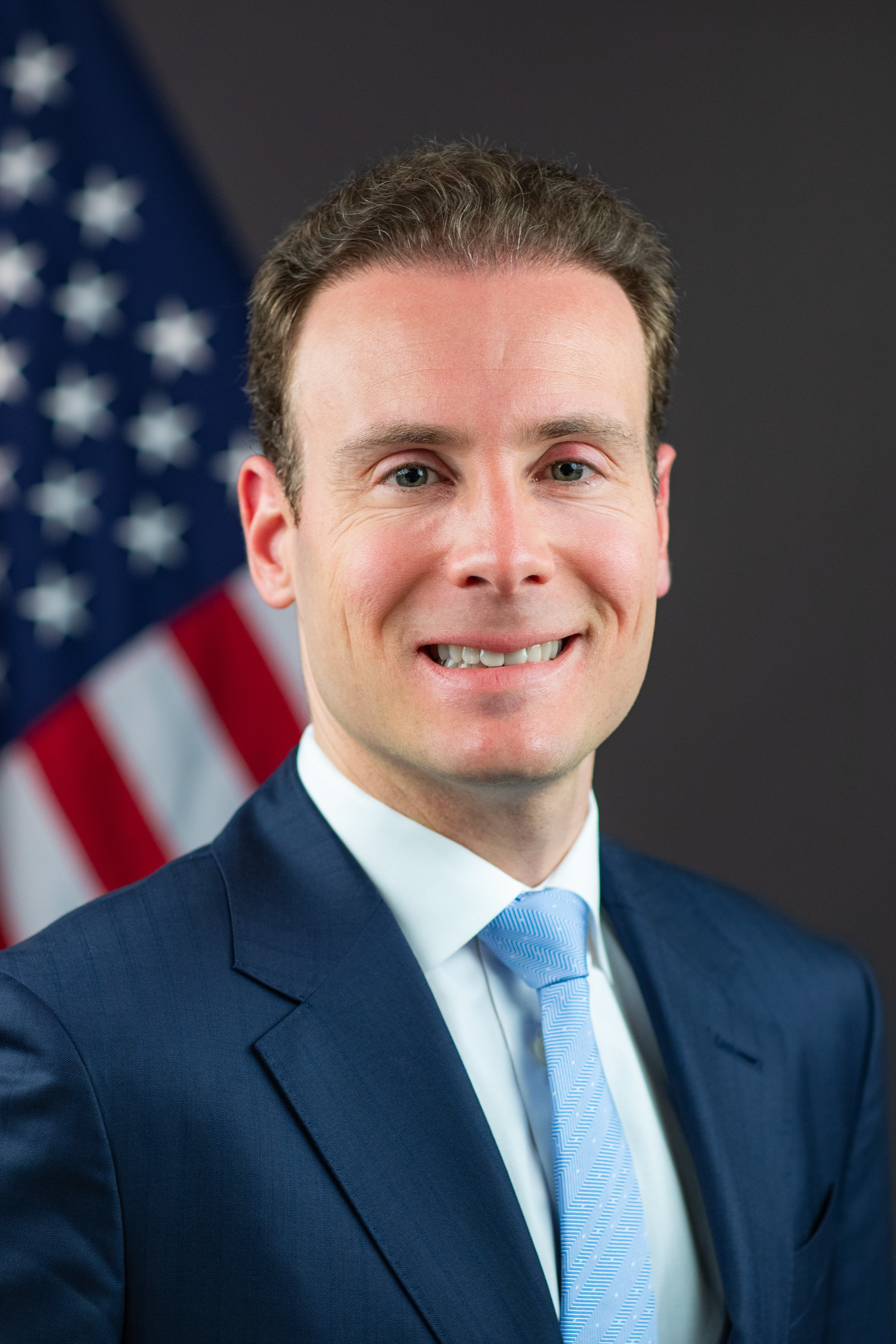
Chairman Michael Selig

The current CFTC commissioners as of December 22, 2025:

Position	Name	Party	Took office	Term expires
Chairman	Michael Selig	Republican	December 22, 2025	April 13, 2029
Member	Vacant	—	—	April 13, 2027
Member	Vacant	—	—	April 13, 2028
Member	Vacant	—	—	April 13, 2030
Member	Vacant	—	—	June 19, 2031

=== Nominations ===
President Trump has nominated the following to fill a seat on the commission. They await Senate confirmation.

Name	Party	Term expires	Replacing
Nathan Anonick	Republican	June 19, 2031	Rostin Behnam
Matt Rowland	Democratic	April 13, 2028	Summer Mersinger

=== Major operating units ===
==== Division of Enforcement ====
The Division of Enforcement (DOE) investigates and prosecutes alleged violations of the Commodity Exchange Act and CFTC regulations. Violations may involve commodity futures or option trading on domestic commodity exchanges, or the improper marketing of commodity investments. The Division may, at the direction of the commission, file complaints before the agency's administrative law judges or in the U.S. District Courts. Alleged criminal violations of the Commodity Exchange Act or violations of other Federal laws which involve commodity futures trading may be referred to the Justice Department for prosecution. The Division also provides expert help and technical assistance with case development and trials to U.S. Attorneys' Offices, other Federal and state regulators, and international authorities.

==== Division of Market Oversight ====
The Division of Market Oversight (DMO) has regulatory responsibility for initial recognition and continuing oversight of trade execution facilities, including new registered futures exchanges, swap execution facilities, and swap data repositories. The regulatory functions of the Division include, among other things, rule enforcement reviews, reviews of new products and product- and market-related rule amendments, and associated product and market-related studies. The Division was previously responsible for market and trade practice surveillance.

==== Market Participants Division ====
Formerly known as the Division of Swap Dealer and Intermediary Oversight, the Market Participants Division (MPD) primarily oversees derivatives market intermediaries, including commodity pool operators, commodity trading advisors, futures commission merchants, introducing brokers, major swap participants, retail foreign exchange dealers, and swap dealers, as well as designated self-regulatory organizations. MPD conducts the registration, compliance, and business conduct standards of intermediaries, swap dealers and major swap participants. The division also oversees the agency's customer education initiatives.

==== Division of Clearing and Risk ====
The Division of Clearing and Risk (DCR) oversees derivatives clearing organizations (DCOs) and other market participants in the clearing process. These include futures commission merchants, swap dealers, major swap participants, and large traders. DCR monitors the clearing of futures, options on futures, and swaps by DCOs, assesses DCO compliance with Commission regulations, and conducts risk assessment and surveillance. DCR also makes recommendations on DCO applications and eligibility, rule submissions, and which types of swaps should be cleared. As of 2019, Clark Hutchison serves as Director of the Division of Clearing and Risk.

=== List of past commissioners ===
This list is sourced from the CFTCs website.

- Caroline Pham (term of service 04/14/22 – 12/22/25)
- Kristin N. Johnson (term of service 03/20/22 – 09/03/25)
- Christy Goldsmith Romero (term of service 03/20/22 – 05/31/25)
- Summer K. Mersinger (term of service 03/20/22 – 05/31/25)
- Rostin Behnam (acting chairman 01/21/21 – 01/04/22; chairman 01/04/22 – 01/20/25; term of service 09/06/17 – 02/07/25)
- Dawn DeBerry Stump (term of service 09/05/18 – 04/14/22)
- Dan M. Berkovitz (term of service 09/07/18 – 10/15/21)
- Brian D. Quintenz (term of service 08/15/17 – 08/31/21)
- Heath Tarbert (chairman 07/15/2019 – 01/21/2021; term of service 07/15/2019 – 03/05/2021)
- J. Christopher Giancarlo (acting chairman 01/20/17 – 08/03/17; chairman 08/03/17 – 04/13/19; term of service 06/06/14 – 06/05/19)
- Sharon Y. Bowen (term of service 06/09/14 – 09/29/17)
- Timothy Massad (term of service 6/5/14 – 02/17/17)
- Mark P. Wetjen (term of service 10/25/11 – 08/28/15)
- Scott D. O'Malia (term of service 10/19/09 – 08/08/14)
- Bart Chilton (term of service 08/08/07 – 03/21/14)
- Gary Gensler (chairman 05/26/09 – 01/3/14; term of service 05/26/09 – 01/3/14)
- Jill E. Sommers (term of service 08/08/07 – 07/08/13)
- Michael V. Dunn (acting chairman 1/20/09 – 5/25/09; term of service 11/21/04 – 10/24/11)
- Walter L. Lukken (acting chairman 6/27/07 – 01/20/09; term of service 08/07/02 – 07/10/09)
- Reuben Jeffery, III (chairman 07/11/05 – 6/27/07; term of service 07/11/05 – 06/27/07)
- Frederick W. Hatfield (term of service 12/06/04 – 12/31/06)
- Sharon Brown-Hruska (acting chairman 08/24/04 – 07/10/05; term of service 08/07/02 – 07/28/06)
- James E. Newsome (acting chairman 01/20/01 – 12/27/01; chairman 12/27/01 – 07/23/04; term of service 08/10/98 – 07/23/04)
- Thomas J. Erickson (term of service 06/21/99 – 12/01/02)
- Barbara P. Holum (acting Chairwoman 12/22/93 – 10/07/94; term of service 11/28/93 – 12/09/03)
- David D. Spears (acting chairman 06/02/99 – 08/10/99; term of service 09/03/96 – 12/20/01)
- Brooksley E. Born (Chairwoman 08/26/96 – 06/01/99)
- John E. Tull, Jr. (acting chairman 01/27/96 – 08/25/96; term of service 11/24/93 – 02/27/99)
- Joseph B. Dial (term of service 06/20/91 – 11/13/97)
- Mary L. Schapiro (Chairwoman 10/13/94 – 01/26/96) (term of service 10/13/94 – 01/26/96)
- Sheila C. Bair (acting Chairwoman 08/22/93 – 12/21/93) (term of service 05/02/91 – 06/16/95)
- William P. Albrecht (acting chairman 01/22/93 – 08/20/93) (term of service 11/22/88 – 08/20/93)
- Wendy L. Gramm (term of service 02/22/88 – 01/22/93)
- Fowler C. West (term of service 10/06/82 – 01/20/93)
- Kalo A. Hineman (acting chairman 07/27/87 – 02/22/83) (term of service 01/12/82 – 06/19/91)
- Robert R. Davis (terms of service 10/03/84 – 04/30/90)
- William Rainer (term of service 08/11/99 – 01/19/01)
- William E. Seale (term of service 11/16/83 – 09/01/88)
- Susan M. Philips (Chairwoman 11/17/83 – 07/24/87; acting Chairwoman 05/28/83 – 11/16/83) (term of service 11/16/81 – 07/24/87)
- Philip McBride Johnson (chairman 6/8/81 – 5/01/83; term of service 06/06/81 – 05/01/83)
- James M. Stone (chairman 05/04/79 – 06/08/81) (term of service 05/04/79 – 01/31/83)
- Read P. Dunn (term of service 04/15/75 – 11/13/81)
- David G. Gartner (term of service 05/19/78 – 10/05/82)
- Robert L. Martin (term of service 06/20/75 – 08/31/81)
- Gary L. Seevers (acting chairman 12/06/78 – 05/03/79) (term of service 04/15/75 – 06/01/79)
- Bill Bagley (term of service 04/15/75 – 11/15/78)
- John V. Rainbolt (term of service 04/15/75 – 05/18/78)

=== Notable events of past commissioners ===
Roy Lavik served as the CFTC (Commodity Futures and Trading Commission) Inspector General from 1990 until 2023. On May 3, 2023, the Wall Street Journal Reports that Mr. Lavik was suspended by the CFTC as the Inspector General after an oversight body alleging "Substantial Misconduct". Complaints of misconduct go back as far as late 2018. Allegations include:

- Divulging the identity of whistleblowers on multiple occasions
- Misappropriating around $165,000 in funds for a hire that did little or no work
- Violating agency security policies by allowing others to use his username and password to access sensitive systems

== Funding/budget ==
Unlike the other four main financial regulators, the CFTC does not have self-funding. A transaction fee has been "requested" for several years but Congress has not taken any legislative action. During the government shut down in October 2013, SEC and Federal Reserve stayed open, but "futures and most swaps markets were left with essentially no cop on the beat".

In 2007, the CFTC's budget was $98 million and it had 437 full-time equivalent employees (FTEs). After 2008, funding increased by 80% to $205 million and 687 FTEs for fiscal year (FY) 2012, but was cut to $180.4 million and 682 FTEs for FY 2013. In 2013 CFTC's performance was severely affected by limited resources and had to delay cases. The current, FY 2014 funding of $215 M did not keep up with CFTC's increasing swaps market oversight and regulation, equivalent to tens of trillions of dollars in formerly dark market trading, according to outgoing Commissioner Bart Chilton in his last speech. The Obama administration's latest budget proposal for FY 2015 requested $280 M, which is $35 M less than the request for the previous year, and would fund "100 less employees than we need" per Chilton, who called the budget "woefully insufficient" for CFTC's more than 40-fold increased purview.

In February 2014, Commissioner Scott D. O'Malia dissented from the FY 2014 spending plan saying that it did not allocate enough funding to new technology investments, but allocated too much to swap dealer oversight, duplicating the work of the self-regulatory National Futures Association. In March 2014 he dissented from the FY 2015 budget request stating CFTC "makes an unrealistic request for new staff and funding in this budget request without a firm understanding of its mission priorities, specific goals, and corresponding personnel and technology needs."

In December 2019, the CFTC secured funding of $284 million for FY2020, an increase of nearly 6 percent from the $268 million appropriated for FY2019. Chairman Tarbert commented that this "fully matched" the CFTC's request, the first time that had happened in "nearly a decade".

== Primary exchanges monitored ==
- Chicago Board Options Exchange
- Chicago Board of Trade
- Chicago Mercantile Exchange
- COMEX
- Kansas City Board of Trade
- Minneapolis Grain Exchange
- North American Derivatives Exchange
- New York Mercantile Exchange
- New York Board of Trade
- OneChicago

== See also ==
- CFTC Whistleblower Program
- Commodity
- Digital Commodities Consumer Protection Act
- CFTC report
- Federal Trade Commission
- Forex scam
- Futures Industry Association, trade organization
- Hunter Wise Commodities
- List of financial supervisory authorities by country
- Managed futures account
- Securities market participants (United States)
- Title 17 of the Code of Federal Regulations
