= Rostin Behnam =

American lawyer and government official

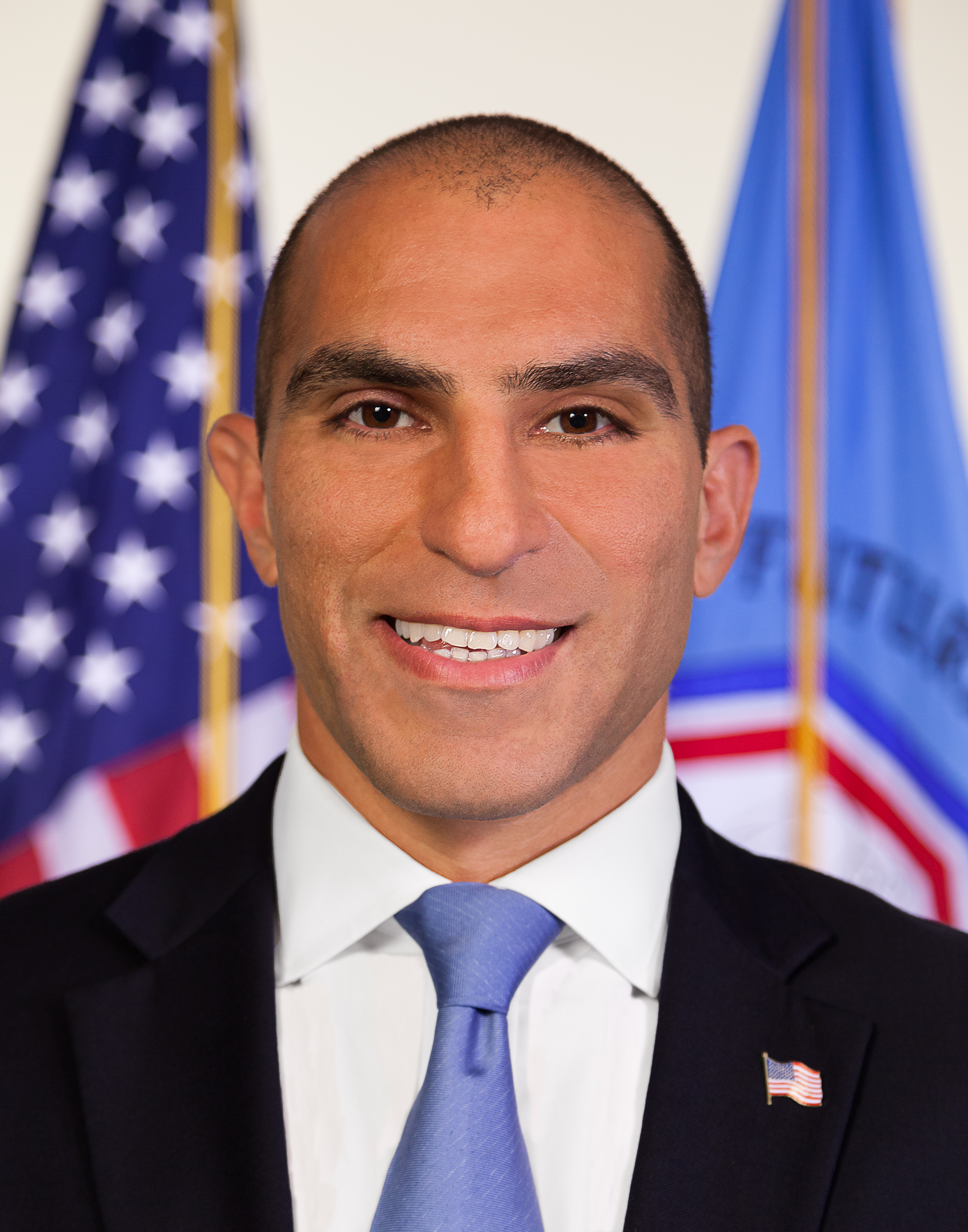

Chair of the Commodity Futures Trading Commission
- In office January 21, 2021 – January 20, 2025
- President: Joe Biden
- Preceded by: Heath Tarbert
- Succeeded by: Caroline Pham (acting)

Commissioner of the Commodity Futures Trading Commission
- In office September 6, 2017 – February 7, 2025
- President: Donald Trump; Joe Biden; Donald Trump
- Preceded by: Mark Wetjen
- Succeeded by: vacant

Personal details
- Born: February 16, 1978 (age 48) Stratford, New Jersey, U.S.
- Party: Democratic
- Education: Georgetown University (BA); Syracuse University (JD)

Rostin Behnam (born February 16, 1978) is an American lawyer and government official who served as the 15th chairman of the Commodity Futures Trading Commission (CFTC) from 2021 to 2025. Initially appointed as a commissioner by President Donald Trump in 2017, he was later designated acting chairman in 2021 by President Joe Biden and subsequently confirmed as chairman for a full term. Before joining the CFTC, he held roles in financial regulation and policy.

== Early life and education ==
Behnam was born in Stratford, New Jersey, and raised in Franklin Lakes, New Jersey, along with his elder brother and sister. Behnam’s parents, both of Persian descent, worked in medicine. His mother was a midwife.

== Career ==
Behnam was first appointed to the U.S. Commodity Futures Trading Commission (CFTC) as a Commissioner on April 4, 2017, by President Donald Trump. His work largely focused on issues related to market integrity, risk management, and financial stability. He became well known for his advocacy on addressing climate-related financial risks in derivatives markets and broader economic systems.

In March 2021, following the election of President Joe Biden, Behnam was nominated to serve as Chairman of the CFTC, and his nomination was confirmed by the U.S. Senate in September 2021.

Behnam announced his resignation from his role as Chairman of the CFTC in February 2025.

=== Artificial Intelligence ===
During his tenure as Chairman of the Commodity Futures Trading Commission (CFTC), Behnam focused on integration of artificial intelligence (AI) in derivatives markets. He established the CFTC’s AI Task Force to evaluate AI-related use cases and risks, resulting in the agency’s first advisory on AI use by registered entities. During his tenure, the CFTC appointed its first Chief Artificial Intelligence Officer and launched an enterprise-wide analytics and AI strategy to improve oversight, enforcement, and resource allocation. Behnam advocated for a technology-neutral regulatory approach that balanced innovation with market integrity and compliance with existing laws.

=== LIBOR Transition ===
Behnam played a central role in guiding the U.S. derivatives market through the transition away from the London Interbank Offered Rate (LIBOR). As sponsor of the CFTC’s Market Risk Advisory Committee (MRAC), he initiated the Interest Rate Benchmark Reform Subcommittee to support the move toward alternative reference rates, particularly the Secured Overnight Financing Rate (SOFR).

=== Data and Cyber ===
Behnam advanced the CFTC’s data infrastructure and cyber resilience capabilities during his chairmanship. He led efforts to modernize internal data architecture, supported staff upskilling in analytics and machine learning, and emphasized the need for real-time monitoring tools to address evolving market and cyber risks. His keynote remarks consistently drew analogies between data use and long-distance endurance training, advocating for foundational investments that enabled the agency to handle emerging technologies and threats with greater agility.

=== Government service ===
Behnam’s major responsibilities included advising Senator Stabenow on the implementation of the Dodd-Frank Wall Street Reform and Consumer Protection Act and related matters affecting the Treasury Department, the U.S. prudential regulators (safety and soundness), and the Securities and Exchange Commission. Behnam also focused on legislative issues regarding agricultural biotechnology and crop protection issues.

Behnam worked alongside Chairwoman Stabenow during her successful effort in leading passage of the bipartisan 2014 U.S. Farm Bill. During that time, Behnam focused on the new and evolving risks for the agricultural economy and strengthening legacy risk management programs. Stabenow’s unique focus on risks related to climate change, highlighted by the numerous climate related disasters agricultural producers and rural communities faced leading up to 2014, helped garner support for the inclusion of a wide range of programs in the final law. The 2014 Farm Bill enhanced the federal crop insurance program, revised commodity programs, and retroactively authorized multiple disaster programs beginning in FY2012. Many of these same programs were strengthened and included in the 2018 U.S. Farm Bill.

Behnam played a key role in drafting the 2016 GMO labeling bill.

=== Climate-related Financial Risk ===
Behnam is an advocate for addressing climate-related financial risks in the derivatives markets and economy. He led the creation of the Climate-Related Market Risk Subcommittee within the CFTC’s Market Risk Advisory Committee, resulting in the 2020 report Managing Climate Risk in the U.S. Financial System, the first such report from a U.S. government entity. He also testified before the House Select Committee on the Climate Crisis and emphasized the role of market regulators in mitigating climate risk.

In December 2023, Behnam spoke at COP28, announcing the CFTC’s proposal for federal guidelines on voluntary carbon credit derivatives. His announcement received positive response from Treasury Secretary Janet Yellen and U.S. Special Envoy on Climate John Kerry.

=== Post-government career ===
In February 2026, Behnam was appointed as global head of public policy & corporate affairs at Bloomberg L.P.

In January 2026, Behnam was appointed to the board of governor of Financial Industry Regulatory Authority.

In February 2025, Behnam joined Georgetown University's Psaros Center for Financial Markets and Policy as a Distinguished Fellow. The center describes his work as focusing on the intersection of financial markets and public policy.

In 2025, Behnam continued to participate in congressional discussions on financial regulation and digital assets. A biography submitted to the U.S. House of Representatives identified him as a Distinguished Fellow at Georgetown and described his work on cryptocurrency regulation, artificial intelligence and derivatives-market policy during his CFTC chairmanship.

In 2026, Behnam participated in a panel of Georgetown's Financial Markets Quality Conference examining prediction markets, alongside discussions of tokenization, market structure and financial technology.

=== Policy positions and areas of focus ===
Behnam's public work has focused on derivatives-market regulation, financial-market risk and the regulatory challenges created by technological change. As CFTC chairman, he advocated stronger customer protections, improved market data and reporting, risk management and regulatory coordination. He also emphasized the need for the CFTC to have an appropriate regulatory framework for digital commodities and emerging financial technologies.

His tenure also included efforts to increase the agency's technological capacity and address new risks associated with artificial intelligence, digital assets and changing market structures. In his final address as chairman, Behnam emphasized market oversight, customer protection, technology and cooperation with domestic and international regulators.

=== Work at Senate ===
Prior to his CFTC service, Behnam served as senior counsel on the Senate Committee on Agriculture, Nutrition, and Forestry for U.S. Senator Debbie Stabenow of Michigan. He has also worked on a proprietary equities trading desk, practiced law in New York City and with the Bureau of Securities in the state of New Jersey’s Office of Attorney General, and co-founded a short-lived regional commuter airline.

== Views and opinions ==
An advocate for the financial reform efforts after the 2008 financial crisis, Behnam supported completion and ongoing revision of rules implementing the 2010 Dodd-Frank Wall Street Reform and Consumer Protection Act.

Behnam has led initiatives to address ongoing and emerging risks related to LIBOR reform, climate-related market risk, retail participation in the digital asset commodity markets, risk concentration within financial market infrastructure, and diversity, equity, and inclusion (DEI) in the CFTC and larger derivatives and financial markets. He is an advocate for federal regulation of the digital asset markets, calling on the White House for leadership and testifying before Congress on the subject.

== Personal life ==
Behnam lives in Baltimore with his wife and three children.
