= David Nason =

American lawyer, government official and corporate executive

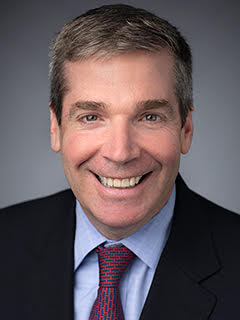

Assistant Secretary of the Treasury for Financial Institutions
- In office March 2007 – March 2009
- President: George W. Bush; Barack Obama
- Preceded by: Wayne A. Abernathy
- Succeeded by: Michael S. Barr

Personal details
- Born: David George Nason; October 6, 1970 (age 56) Providence, Rhode Island, U.S.
- Party: Republican
- Spouse: Nicole Nason
- Children: 3
- Education: American University (BS, BA, JD)

David George Nason (born October 6, 1970) is an American lawyer, government official and corporate executive from Washington, DC. He served as the president and CEO of GE Energy Financial Services, a unit of General Electric (GE) from 2013 to 2018. Previously at GE, he was the Chief Regulatory Officer and Compliance Leader at GE Capital. Nason is one of 190 GE officers globally. From 2005–2009 he served as Assistant Secretary for Financial Institutions under Treasury Secretary Henry M. Paulson, during which time he was a key architect of the federal government's response to the 2008 financial crisis.

In 2019, he joined the Teachers Insurance and Annuity Association of America (TIAA) as Executive Vice President and Chief Risk & Compliance Officer. He is now Chief Operating Officer of TIAA and President of TIAA Wealth Management.

== Early career ==
=== Covington & Burling, 1996–2002 ===
From 1996 to 2002, Nason was an attorney in the Washington law firm of Covington & Burling, where he worked on a wide array of corporate transactions, including public and private securities offerings, merger agreements and corporate reorganizations.

Before joining Covington & Burling, he served as a law clerk to the Honorable Judge Marvin J. Garbis of the U.S. District Court for the District of Maryland.

== Government service ==
=== Securities and Exchange Commission, 2002–2005 ===
Before joining the Treasury Department, Nason spent three years as counsel to Securities and Exchange Commissioner Paul S. Atkins. At the SEC, Nason assisted in implementing the Sarbanes-Oxley Act of 2002, including creation of the Public Company Accounting Oversight Board, corporate governance and listing requirements modifications, and financial accounting rules and policy. He advised the SEC on investment management matters and on securities offering reform. In addition, Nason managed all of the Enron enforcement actions for Commissioner Atkins.

=== U.S. Treasury Department, 2005–2009 ===
Nason joined the U.S. Department of the Treasury in October 2005 as Deputy Assistant Secretary for Financial Institutions. In March 2007, President George W. Bush nominated him for promotion to Assistant Secretary for Financial Institutions, and he was unanimously confirmed by the U.S. Senate.

As a member of Treasury Secretary Henry M. Paulson's senior team, Nason played a pivotal role in creating, developing and implementing the Treasury's response to the 2008 financial crisis. He co-developed the Capital Purchase Program of the Troubled Asset Relief Program (TARP), which injected more than $200 billion into approximately 700 banks. Nason also spearheaded the creation of the Treasury's Temporary Guarantee Program for Money Market Mutual Funds, a $3 trillion insurance program that generated $1.2 billion in fees and incurred no losses. Early in his tenure, Nason led Treasury's financial regulatory reform efforts, including the publication of Treasury's Blueprint for a Modernized Financial Regulatory Structure. Nason also played a leading role in the Treasury's efforts to enhance the regulation and supervision of Fannie Mae, Freddie Mac and the Federal Home Loan banks.

At Treasury, Nason was known as a "mini-policy think tank," "pragmatic" and "one of the department's most important advisers."

Andrew Ross Sorkin's bestselling book Too Big to Fail (Viking 2009) says Nason was Treasury's "resident policy-making brain" who had been warning since 2007 that a Bear Stearns-like run on one or more banks was likely. In his 2010 memoir On the Brink, Secretary Paulson says that Nason "had the most thorough knowledge of bank guarantees at either the Fed or Treasury," and describes the money market guarantee Nason helped design as "the single most powerful and important actions taken to hold the system together."

== Private sector ==
=== Promontory Financial Group, 2009–2010 ===
As a managing director at Promontory Financial Group, Nason advised financial institutions on strategic matters including corporate governance, risk and financial controls, due diligence, potential combinations and regulatory requirements. Nason was a frequent commentator on Bloomberg and CNBC, and a sought-after source on financial matters among other national media. In May 2009, he testified before the Senate Committee on Homeland Security & Governmental Affairs, urging Congress to modernize U.S. regulatory structures so they keep up with the financial innovations driven by rapid capital mobility, deep liquidity and technology.

In December 2009, in an opinion piece in The New York Times, Nason called for a re-examination of the Troubled Asset Relief Program (TARP) repayment standards.

=== GE Capital, 2010–2013 ===
In August 2010, Nason was named senior vice president and chief regulatory and compliance officer for GE Capital. In this role, Nason led the global regulatory and compliance team and is preparing GE Capital for the changing regulatory environment in markets around the world.

=== GE Energy Financial Services, 2013–2018 ===
David Nason was president and CEO of GE Energy Financial Services, where he led GE's energy investments worldwide. GE Energy Financial Services has 35+ years of experience managing energy assets through multiple economic cycles, and a global portfolio that spans conventional and renewable power, and oil and gas infrastructure projects. Nason chaired the business’ investment committee and was responsible for a $14 billion portfolio of investments in both debt and equity.

=== Teachers Insurance and Annuity Association of America (TIAA), 2019–Present ===
TIAA, a leading financial services provider, announced in September 2019 that David G. Nason joined the company as Executive Vice President and Chief Risk and Compliance Officer. In this newly created position, Nason led the combined Risk Management and Compliance functions for the company which assists TIAA as its risk and compliance needs evolve in a dynamic market.

He is now Chief Operating Officer of TIAA and President of TIAA Wealth Management.

== Honors and awards ==
For Nason's service during the 2008 financial crisis and his contributions to regulatory reform, he was given the Alexander Hamilton Award, the Treasury's highest honor.

In 2009, Nason was designated a Young Global Leader by the World Economic Forum., aligning him with others who were recognized for their commitment to shaping the global future.

Also in 2009, Nason received the American University's Kogod School of Business's Community Leadership Award, which honors those who have demonstrated leadership in business and who have influenced both their company and their community.

=== Board seats ===
In May 2007, Nason was appointed by President George W. Bush and confirmed by the Senate to serve on the board of directors of the National Cooperative Bank (NCB), an institution chartered by Congress in 1978 to serve the financial needs of cooperatives.

In 2008, Nason was designated by Secretary Paulson to serve on the board of the Securities Investor Protection Corporation (SIPC), a federal non-profit corporation that protects securities investors from financial harm if a broker-dealer company fails.

Nason serves on the Board of Directors of TIAA Bank, the Board of Directors of IntraFi Network, and on the Board of Advisors for the Hospital for Special Surgery in New York City.

== Personal life ==
Nason was born and raised in Providence, Rhode Island. His father was a UPS driver. Nason earned a B.S./B.A. in finance from The American University in 1992 and a J.D., summa cum laude, from The American University's Washington College of Law in 1995.

Nason is married to Nicole Nason, a former assistant secretary at the U.S. Department of Transportation who served as the administrator at the National Highway Traffic Safety Administration from May 2006 to September 2008 and currently serves as Administrator of the Federal Highway Administration. They reside in Virginia.

Government offices
Preceded by Emil Henry	Assistant Secretary of the Treasury for Financial Institutions; 2007–2009	Succeeded by Michael S. Barr
