= Jeanette Quick =

American attorney

Deputy Assistant Secretary of the Treasury for Financial Institutions
- In office December 2023 – January 2025
- President: Joe Biden

Personal details
- Education: University of California, Berkeley (BA); Georgetown University (JD)

Jeanette Quick is an American attorney and former government official who served as the Deputy Assistant Secretary of the Treasury for Financial Institutions in the Biden Administration and deputy commissioner of investor protection at the California Department of Financial Protection and Innovation for California Governor Gavin Newsom. Her work at Treasury focused on studying opportunities and risks presented by artificial intelligence within the financial sector.

Quick was valedictorian of Simi Valley High School at the age of 16.

Quick earned her undergraduate degree from University of California, Berkeley and a J.D. from Georgetown University Law Center. She is also an author of theater reviews and a poet.

== Career ==
Quick began her legal career at the Office of the Comptroller of the Currency, where she served in the New York and DC offices. In 2011, she moved to the legislative branch to work for Chairman Tim Johnson and then Chairman Sherrod Brown of the US Senate Committee on Banking, Housing, and Urban Affairs.

In 2017, Quick left public service to work for Scratch and then as head of legal, public policy, and compliance at the US payments company Gusto. In 2020, she ran for public office to serve on the board of trustees for the City College of San Francisco, but did not win.

In 2022, Governor Newsom appointed Quick as deputy commissioner of investor protection at the California Department of Financial Protection and Innovation. In that role, she led the organization's cryptocurrency unit and special projects focused on protecting consumers.

In December 2023, Quick joined the Department of Treasury as a Deputy Assistant Secretary of the Treasury for Financial Institutions. She oversaw the Office of Financial Institutions Policy and the Federal Insurance Office. Quick led work focused on AI in financial services, focused on assessing risks and opportunities associated with the technology.
