= Actus =

Actus may refer to:

- In Ancient Rome:
  - Actus (unit of length), unit of length
  - Actus, path which could only have a horse cart
- Actus purus, a term employed in scholastic philosophy to express the absolute perfection of God
- Actus tragicus, another name for the Bach cantata Gottes Zeit ist die allerbeste Zeit, BWV 106
- Actus Tragicus (comics), a group of five Israeli comics artists
- A French acronym for Chadian Action for Unity and Socialism, a communist political party in Chad
- An acronym for Algorithmic Contract Types Unified Standards, a standard that represents financial instruments by their underlying algorithms

== See also ==
- Actus reus
