= Systemic Risk Council =

The Systemic Risk Council was formed in 2012 by The Pew Charitable Trusts and CFA Institute to help ensure the effective implementation of the Dodd–Frank Wall Street Reform and Consumer Protection Act and related measures related to mitigating systemic risk.

== Charter ==
“This new council is composed of experts with a thorough understanding of the issues, and we are pleased to support their efforts to find nonpartisan and independent recommendations. The reforms to our nation’s financial system enacted by Congress and signed by the president in 2010 were an important first step. The task now is to implement these reforms, especially those related to systemic risk.” Rebecca W. Rimel, president and CEO of The Pew Charitable Trusts

- “Despite the magnitude of the financial crisis, prospects for major reform of regulatory systems are inadequate and vague ” John D. Rogers, president of the CFA Institute
- “The great challenge is to devise a system to identify risks that threaten market stability before they become a danger to the general public. As evidenced by the 2008 crisis and even recent headlines, we need a more effective and efficient early-warning system to detect issues that jeopardize the functioning of U.S. financial markets before they disrupt credit flows to the real economy. And two of the most critical tasks are how to impose greater market discipline on excess risk taking and effectively end the doctrine too-big-to-fail.” Sheila Bair, chair of the Systemic Risk Council.
- “nothing has been finalized. Financial Stability Oversight Council is M.I.A. Office of Financial Research is barely functional. The Volcker Rule is mired in controversy. Securitization reform is stalled. They haven’t even proposed new bank capital rules. The public is becoming cynical about whether the regulators can do anything right, which is undermining support for reforms.” Sheila Bair, chair of the Systemic Risk Council.

== Plans ==
The council issued a call to action on June 18, 2012 at The Pew Charitable Trusts in Washington, D.C., detailing the objectives and future plans for the Systemic Risk Council.

- "Our overriding concern stems from the lack of progress made by the members of the Financial Stability Oversight Council (FSOC) and the Office of Financial Research (OFR) to address several critical issues as mandated by the Dodd-Frank Wall Street Reform and Consumer Protection Act (Dodd-Frank), enacted in 2010. That concern increases each day that the implementation of systemic risk reform languishes. A sense of complacency has made reforms for effective oversight seem less urgent despite escalating problems elsewhere in the global financial system. In many ways, the financial system faces larger potential challenges today than it did in the run-up to the 2008 crisis, given the troubled state of the European Union and uncertainties at home related to fiscal and monetary policy. It is essential that the FSOC show leadership in coordinating the rule-writing process to promote the development of cohesive, consistent regulations and provide clear and transparent explanations of the reforms in a way that is understandable to the general public. We have created this Council to assist in that effort."

== Members ==
- Chair Sheila Bair, The Pew Charitable Trusts, Former FDIC Chair
- Senior Advisor Paul Volcker, Former Federal Reserve Chair
- Members
  - Brooksley Born, Former U.S. Commodity Futures Trading Commission Chair
  - Bill Bradley, Former U.S. Senator (D-NJ)
  - William H. Donaldson, Former U.S. SEC Chair
  - Harvey Goldschmid, Columbia Law School, Former U.S. SEC Commissioner
  - Jeremy Grantham, Co-founder & Chief Investment Strategist, Grantham Mayo Van Otterloo (GMO)
  - Chuck Hagel, former Secretary of Defense, Former U.S. Senator (R-NE)
  - Richard J. Herring, The Wharton School, University of Pennsylvania
  - Simon Johnson (economist), MIT Sloan School of Management
  - Hugh F. Johnston, Exec. VP & CFO, PepsiCo http://www.pepsico.com/Download/Pepsico_Johnston.pdf
  - Ira Millstein, Legal Counsel to SRC; Chair, Columbia Law School, Center for Global Markets and Corporate Ownership http://www.weil.com/iramillstein/
  - Maureen O'Hara (professor), Cornell University Johnson School of Management
  - Paul O'Neill (Secretary of the Treasury), CEO, Alcoa, Former U.S. Treasury Secretary
  - John S. Reed, Former Chairman and CEO of Citicorp and Citibank
  - John Rogers, CFA, President and CEO, CFA Institute http://www.cfainstitute.org/about/press/experts/Pages/john_rogers.aspx
  - Alan K. Simpson, Former U.S. Senator (R-WY)
  - Chester S. Spatt, Professor of Finance, Carnegie Mellon Tepper School of Business http://public.tepper.cmu.edu/facultydirectory/FacultyDirectoryProfile.aspx?id=124

== See also ==
- The Pew Charitable Trusts
- CFA Institute
- Systemic risk
- Category:Systemic risk
- Dodd–Frank Wall Street Reform and Consumer Protection Act
- Financial Stability Oversight Council
- Office of Financial Research
