= Graham Steele (American attorney) =

American attorney

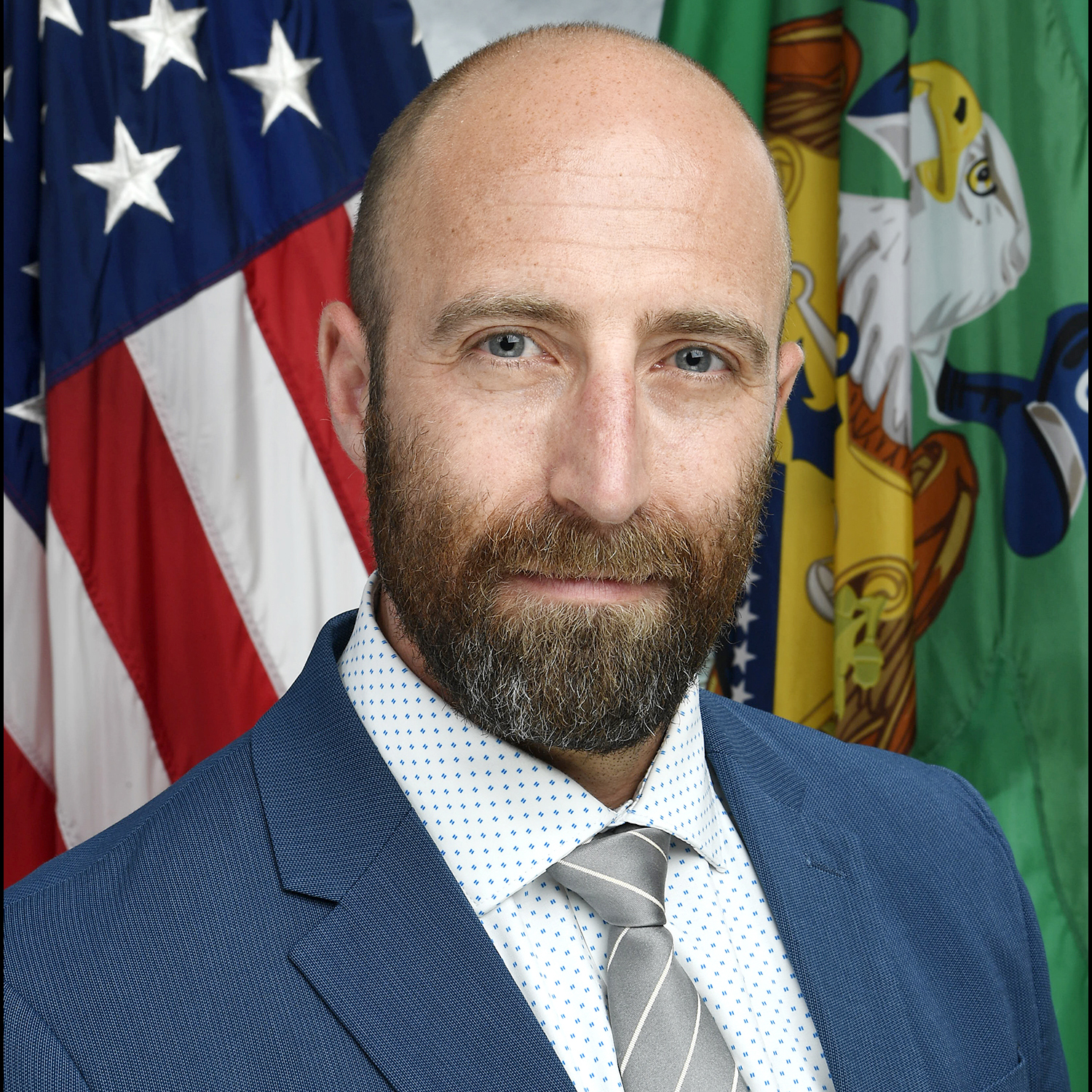

Assistant Secretary of the Treasury for Financial Institutions
- In office December 3, 2021 – January 19, 2024
- President: Joe Biden
- Preceded by: Bimal Patel
- Succeeded by: Luke Pettit

Personal details
- Born: Graham Scott Steele
- Party: Democratic
- Education: University of Rochester (BA); George Washington University (JD)

Graham Scott Steele is an American attorney, policy advisor, and government official. In July 2021, Steele was nominated by President Joe Biden to serve as Assistant Secretary of the Treasury for Financial Institutions. He was confirmed by the Senate and served in the position until January 2024.

Steele previously served as director of the Corporations and Society Initiative at the Stanford Graduate School of Business (GSB). Prior to this, Steele served in a variety of political roles, including as Democratic chief counsel on the Senate Banking Committee and as an aide to Senator Sherrod Brown of Ohio.

== Early life and education ==
Originally from Brookline, Massachusetts, Steele attended the University of Rochester for his undergraduate education, where he received a degree in political science in 2002. Steele studied law at George Washington University Law School in Washington, D.C., and joined the Massachusetts State Bar after graduation. His childhood nicknames were "Granimal" and "The Colonel."

== Career ==
Steele began his career as a policy counsel at Public Citizen, a consumer advocacy organization. Prior to joining the GSB, served on the staff of the Federal Reserve Bank of San Francisco and as legislative assistant to Senator Sherrod Brown, who currently chairs the Senate Banking Committee. Steele was a senior fellow at the American Economic Liberties Project (AELP), an anti-monopoly organization.

=== Assistant Secretary of the Treasury for Financial Institutions ===
==== Nomination ====
On July 19, 2021, Steele was nominated as Assistant Secretary of the Treasury for Financial Institutions, a position that oversees the federal Office of Financial Institutions. Steele's nomination was praised by environmentalist group Evergreen Action, which stated in a press release that Steele "understands the systemic risk that climate change poses to the financial system, and is committed to leading federal regulators in confronting these dangers." Brown, Steele's former employer, also endorsed the nomination, stating that Steele's support for combatting income inequality makes him a strong fit for the role.

On September 21, 2021, the Senate Banking Committee held hearings on Steele's nomination. The committee voted to favorably report Steele's nomination to the Senate floor on October 5, 2021. On November 16, 2021, the entire Senate confirmed Steele's nomination in a vote of 53–42.

=== Tenure ===
In November 2023, it was reported that Steele would resign from the position. He formally left the position in January 2024.

== Views ==
Steele is considered a member of the progressive wing of the Democratic Party, having supported the presidential campaign of Elizabeth Warren in 2020. Steele has indicated his opposition to the renomination of Jerome Powell as Chair of the Federal Reserve.

=== Climate policy ===
In a March 2020 paper published in the Cornell Journal of Law and Public Policy, Steele argued that the Dodd–Frank Wall Street Reform and Consumer Protection Act of 2010 (Dodd-Frank) law gave federal officials the power to use macroprudential regulation to address climate-related financial risks. According to Steele, federal bodies with this power include the Financial Stability Oversight Council as well as the Federal Reserve.

According to a Wall Street Journal article about his nomination, Steele believes that the Federal Reserve "could use its authority to limit fossil-fuel investments based on their prospective risks to financial stability..."

=== Derivatives regulations ===
In a 2019 letter to the Federal Deposit Insurance Corporation (FDIC), Steele argued in favor of restricting derivatives trading to minimize the risk the market poses to the global economy.
