= Bimal Patel =

Bimal Patel may refer to:

- Bimal Patel (architect) (born 1961), Indian architect and urban planner.
- Bimal Patel (attorney), American attorney and former assistant secretary of the Treasury Department.
- Bimal N. Patel, Indian legal scholar and university director.
