= Christopher Campbell =

American political aide

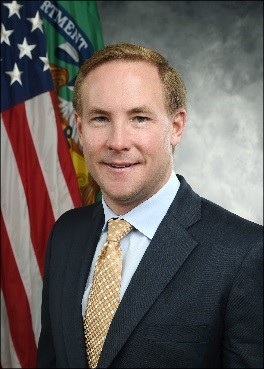

Assistant Secretary of the Treasury for Financial Institutions
- In office September 25, 2017 – July 31, 2018
- President: Donald Trump
- Preceded by: Cyrus Amir-Mokri
- Succeeded by: Bimal Patel

Personal details
- Born: Hemet, California
- Party: Republican
- Education: University of California, Santa Barbara; Thunderbird School of Global Management

Christopher Campbell is a senior executive-level business strategist, former American political aide, and senior government official who previously served as Assistant Secretary of the Treasury for Financial Institutions. He was unanimously confirmed as Assistant Secretary by the United States Senate in 2017. Prior to assuming his Department of Treasury role, Campbell was the majority staff director for the United States Senate Committee on Finance and a senior staff member on the United States Senate Committee on the Judiciary.

== Early career ==
Campbell successfully consulted on a handful of winning U.S. political campaigns for candidates for federal office including several campaigns for former U.S. Senator Orrin Hatch. Additionally Campbell owned a business-consulting firm that specialized in business strategy with clients from all sized companies, from all regions of the country, and from a wide variety of industries.

== U.S. Senate ==
Campbell was the majority staff director to the U.S. Senate Committee on Finance. He designed, managed, and coordinated the U.S. Senate agenda in the areas of international and domestic taxation, international trade, Medicare (United States), Medicaid, Social Security, the U.S. National Debt, and oversight of three presidential cabinet secretaries. He was named by Roll Call Newspaper as one of the 50 most influential staffers on Capitol Hill seven years running and recognized as a bipartisan problem-solver. Previously, he served as legislative director to former U.S. Senator Orrin G. Hatch, where he coordinated and managed the senator's legislative activities.

== U.S. Treasury ==
Campbell was unanimously confirmed by the US Senate to serve as the Assistant Secretary of the Treasury for Financial Institutions from 2017 to 2018. In that role, he was responsible for coordinating the department's efforts regarding financial institutions legislation and regulation, legislation affecting Federal agencies that regulate or insure financial institutions and securities markets legislation and regulation. Specific policy and program areas of oversight included government-sponsored enterprises, critical infrastructure protection (cyber security) and compliance policy, the Federal Insurance Office (FIO), and small business, community development, and affordable housing policy. Campbell was the Treasury board representative on the boards of the Pension Benefit Guarantee Corporation (PBGC) and the Financial Industry's Critical Infrastructure Group. Campbell regularly met with the heads of the 15 federal financial regulators. Campbell oversaw the Deputy Assistant Secretaries for Financial Institutions Policy and Small Business, Community Development and Affordable Housing, and Cyber Security in addition to a staff of 300.

== U.S. International Development Finance Corporation (DFC) ==
As a Special Government Employee (SGE), in 2025, Campbell served as Senior Advisor in a temporary role at U.S. International Development Finance Corporation (DFC), a U.S. government agency, to help the agency expand its critical mission of advancing United States Interests around the world by mobilizing private capital for development projects by providing financial tools like loans, loan guarantees, political risk insurance, and equity investments in sectors like mining, energy, infrastructure, health, and businesses.

== Post-Treasury ==
Campbell is the Founder and CEO of Incamera Solutions, a global strategic advisory firm. Prior to that, Campbell was a Senior Advisor and former Chief Policy Strategist at Kroll. Campbell is a frequent television commentator on issues impacting the economy. Additionally Campbell is a director of several companies including: Apterra, tZERO, National Digital Trust Company, and is a Board Advisor to many global companies like CrossRiver Bank. Campbell is a Professor of Practice at his alma mater, Thunderbird School of Global Management. He also serves as a strategic advisor and consultant to several large national and international organizations. He is a member of the Council on Foreign Relations.

== Media Appearances: Expert Analysis ==
Campbell regularly appears on world-wide economically geared media outlets and on American cable news programs. He is regularly called upon to serve as an expert economic and political commentator on cable and network news shows as well as CNN, Fox News Channel, CNBC, Bloomberg and the BBC among others. He has also published economic commentary in exclusive venues, such as Fox News. Appearances include: CNBC's Squwak Box, CNBC's Worldwide Exchange, Cheddar TV and many more.
