= Sheila Bair =

American academic and government official (born 1954)

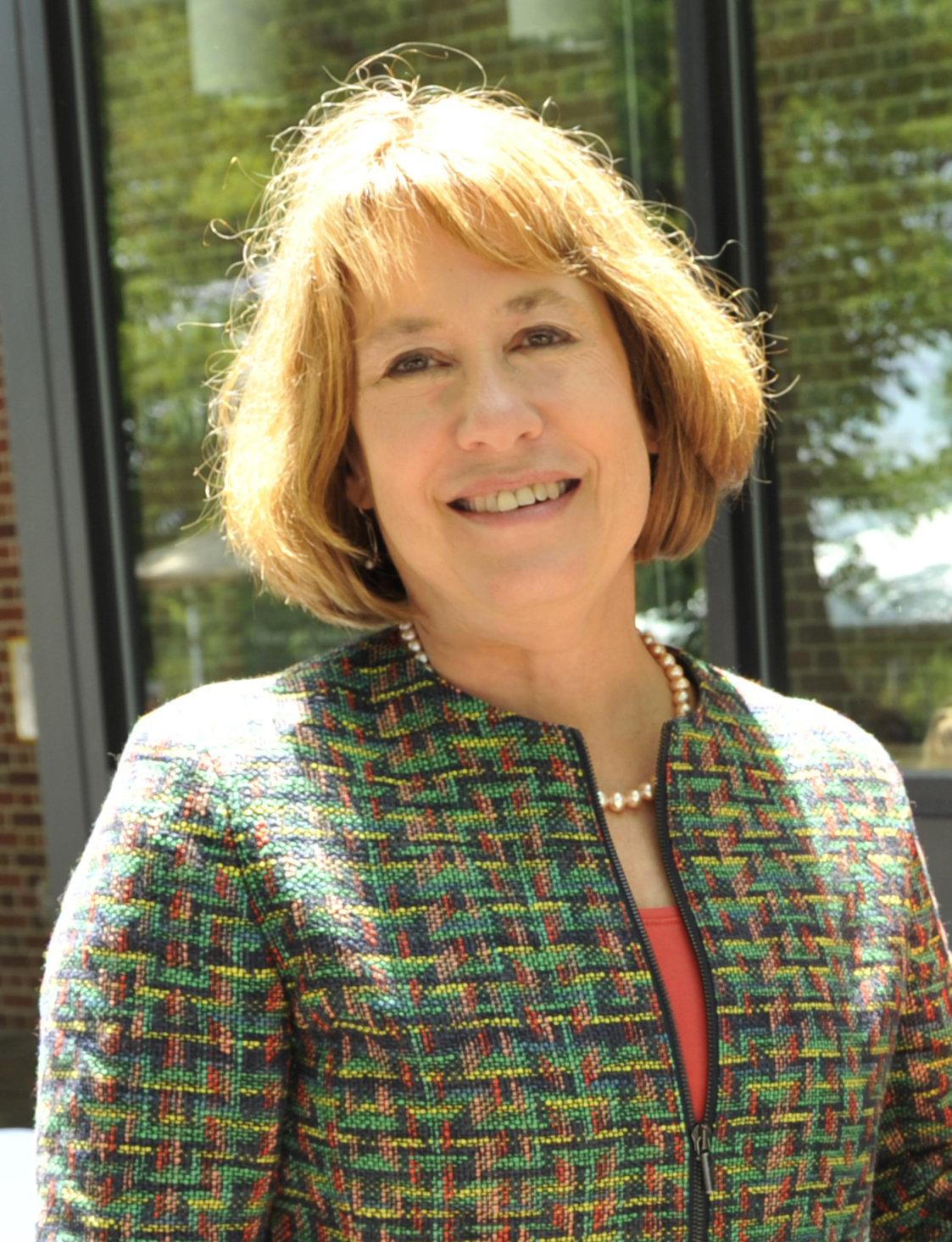
- Bair in 2016

President of Washington College
- In office August 1, 2015 – June 30, 2017
- Preceded by: Jack Griswold
- Succeeded by: Kurt Landgraf

Chair of the Federal Deposit Insurance Corporation
- In office June 26, 2006 – July 8, 2011
- President: George W. Bush; Barack Obama
- Preceded by: Martin Gruenberg (acting)
- Succeeded by: Martin Gruenberg

Assistant Secretary of the Treasury for Financial Institutions
- In office July 2001 – June 2002
- President: George W. Bush
- Preceded by: Gregory Baer
- Succeeded by: Wayne Abernathy

Chair of the Commodity Futures Trading Commission Acting
- In office August 21, 1993 – December 21, 1993
- President: Bill Clinton
- Preceded by: William Albrecht (acting)
- Succeeded by: Barbara Holum (acting)

Personal details
- Born: Sheila Colleen Bair; April 3, 1954 (age 72) Wichita, Kansas, U.S.
- Party: Republican
- Spouse: Scott Cooper
- Children: Two
- Education: University of Kansas (BA, JD)

Sheila Colleen Bair (born April 3, 1954) is an American former government official who was the 19th Chair of the U.S. Federal Deposit Insurance Corporation (FDIC) from 2006 to 2011. Shortly after taking charge of the FDIC, Bair began warning of the potential systemic risks posed by the growing trend of subprime-mortgage-backed bonds, and then later assumed a prominent role in the government's response to the 2008 financial crisis. She was appointed to the post for a five-year term on June 26, 2006 by George W. Bush to serve through July 8, 2011. She was subsequently the 28th president of Washington College in Chestertown, MD, the first female head of the college in its 234-year history, a position she held from 2015 until her resignation in 2017.

== Early life ==
Bair is a native of Independence, Kansas. Born to a Lutheran Christian family, her father Albert (1916–2008), who was of German descent, was a surgeon and her mother, Clara (née' Brenneman) (1921–2017), was a nurse and housewife. Her father also served on the Independence School Board and Independence City Council. She received her bachelor's degree in philosophy from the University of Kansas in 1975, and worked as a bank teller for a brief period, before receiving a J.D. from the University of Kansas School of Law in 1978. In 1981, she was recruited by Senator Bob Dole, a Republican from her state, to serve as counsel on his staff in Washington.

In 1990, Bair ran for the United States House of Representatives to succeed retiring Congressman Bob Whittaker. She narrowly lost the Republican primary to banker Dick Nichols.

== Career ==
=== Pre-FDIC Career ===
Prior to her appointment at the FDIC, Bair was the Dean's Professor of Financial Regulatory Policy for the Isenberg School of Management at the University of Massachusetts Amherst, a post she had held since 2002. She also served as Assistant Secretary for Financial Institutions at the U.S. Department of the Treasury (2001 to 2002), during which time she was awarded The Treasury Medal, an honor that recognized her work in stabilizing the financial infrastructure following the 9/11 attacks and her efforts in developing consumer-focused financial policies. She also served as Senior Vice President for Government Relations of the New York Stock Exchange (1995 to 2000), a Commissioner and Acting Chair of the Commodity Futures Trading Commission (1991 to 1995), and Research Director, Deputy Counsel and Counsel to Kansas Republican Senate Majority Leader Bob Dole (1981 to 1988).

While an academic, Bair also served on the FDIC's Advisory Committee on Banking Policy. Bair also pursued a seat in the U.S. Congress (she lost the 1990 Republican nomination in the 5th Kansas district by 760 votes to Dick Nichols). Bair began her career in the General Counsel's office of the former U.S. Department of Health, Education, and Welfare.

=== FDIC Tenure ===
Bair was appointed to chair the U.S. Federal Deposit Insurance Corporation (FDIC) by President George W. Bush on June 26, 2006. She left the FDIC on July 8, 2011, when her five-year term expired.

During her tenure as FDIC Chair, Bair received multiple prestigious awards and recognitions. In 2009, she was presented the John F. Kennedy Profile in Courage Award in recognition of the political courage she demonstrated in sounding early warnings about conditions that contributed to the global financial crisis. Bair was named a Distinguished Kansan of the Year in 2008, was named Forbes’ 2nd Most Powerful Woman in the World in both 2008 and 2009, and was a recipient of LCCR’s Hubert H. Humphrey Civil Rights Award in 2009. She was also named "the little guy's protector in chief" by TIME magazine, named to the TIME 100 List in 2009 and was featured in the 2010 article, The New Sheriffs Of Wall Street, appearing on the cover. She also received the Better Business Bureau’s Presidents’ Award in 2010 and was the recipient of Jump$tartCoalition’s Federal Leadership Award in 2010.

=== Post-FDIC Career ===
Bair became a senior advisor to The Pew Charitable Trusts in August 2011. She is chair emerita of the Systemic Risk Council, a volunteer effort formed by the CFA Institute and the Pew Charitable Trusts to monitor and comment on regulation.

Bair continued to receive recognition following her FDIC tenure. In November 2011, she was named one of Seven Top American Leaders by the Washington Post and Harvard Kennedy School for Public Leadership. In 2012, BYU Marriott School of Business named her 'Administrator of the Year'. Also in 2012, the Women’s Bar Association of the District of Columbia (WBA), in conjunction with the Women’s Bar Association Foundation (WBAF), recognized Sheila Bair with the Janet Reno Torchbearer Award. The same year, Bair was an honoree of the Council for Economic Education’s Visionary Award. In 2013, Bair was awarded The National Academy of Public Administration’s Elliot L. Richardson Prize for Excellence in Public Service. In 2016, the FDIC honored Bair with the dedication and naming of a new auditorium. That same year, The Daily Record named her an Influential Marylander Honoree for her work in education. In 2026, Bair received the Truman Medal for Economic Policy. Also in 2026, she was the recipient of the Jump$tart Coalition Odom Award.

In May 2015, Bair was appointed president of Washington College, becoming the first female head of the college in its 234-year history. During her tenure as president, Bair helped implement several debt-reducing programs aimed at making a degree more affordable, including "Fixedfor4," which guarantees tuition costs will not rise for students during their four years at college, and "Dam the Debt," which awards scholarships to graduating seniors to help pay off federal student loans. Bair resigned on June 30, 2017, citing the demands of the job and insufficient time with her family.

Since leaving government service, Bair has served on a number of corporate boards. Her past board memberships include Bunge Limited, Lion Electric, and Fannie Mae., where she was named the first woman Chair of the board of directors. Bair previously was on the boards of Host Hotels & Resorts, the state-run Industrial and Commercial Bank of China (2017 to 2020), Thomson Reuters and Santander. She was criticized for joining the board of Santander, a Spanish banking group, which critics viewed as inconsistent with her public views on the revolving door. She has also served on a number of nonprofit boards, including as a founding director of the Volcker Alliance, the Center for Responsible Lending, the RAND Corporation, and the National Women's Law Center.

=== Current Roles ===
In 2021, Ms. Bair was appointed a trustee of Economists for Peace and Security, a group of economists and public servants concerned about issues of peace, conflict, war, and the world economy.

She currently serves on the Santander International Advisory Board, Ripple Stable Coin Advisory Board, Jiko Advisory Board, and is a member of the Wealthfront Banking Advisory Group. Bair also serves as Senior Adviser Center for Financial Stability and remains Founding Chair and Senior Advisor of the Systemic Risk Council.

She is a member of CNBC’s Global Financial Wellness Advisory Board, a member of FoolProof Foundation Walter Cronkite Committee, and is a frequent contributor to Financial Times.

== 2008 Financial Crisis ==
Bair assumed a prominent role in the government's response to the 2008 financial crisis, working alongside and sometimes publicly opposing Treasury Secretary Hank Paulson and Tim Geithner, then president of the New York Federal Reserve. She also helped shape the resulting Dodd–Frank Wall Street Reform and Consumer Protection Act of 2010.

Shortly after taking charge of the FDIC in June 2006, Bair began warning of the potential systemic risks posed by the growing trend of subprime-mortgage-backed bonds. In the spring of 2007 she met privately with industry executives, urging them to modify adjustable-rate mortgages rather than allow homes to go into foreclosure, which could set off a cascading effect throughout the economy. In October 2007, Bair took her argument public with an op-ed in The New York Times.

Within the Bush administration, Bair's mortgage modification argument was initially at odds with the Treasury Secretary who believed such action would have little effect. Bair also resisted many of the government bailouts of insolvent banks; rather she argued that the government should impose greater accountability by forcing those institutions to sell off bad assets, replace management and re-privatize them, more akin to how the FDIC handles smaller banks. Bair argued that when companies are viewed as "too big to fail" it leads to reckless behavior because there is an implicit guarantee of government support. Bair favored "market discipline," meaning shareholders and bondholders would take losses when an institutional fails.

Bair fought against the Federal Reserve's adoption of the Basel II advanced approaches, which would have allowed large banks to use their own internal models to help set their regulatory capital requirements. In the aftermath of the crisis, Bair pressed the Basel Committee on Banking Supervision to adopt strong capital and leverage standards. She successfully argued for international adoption of 'Leverage Ratio' – a strict capital requirement applying to all of a bank's assets to complement more subjective capital standards based on the perceived riskiness of a bank's assets.

The Troubled Asset Relief Program included a mortgage-relief plan partially modeled on Bair's loan-modification ideas. Following the crisis, the Dodd–Frank Wall Street Reform and Consumer Protection Act was drafted with a number of provisions Bair sought, including the FDIC's expanded powers to seize large financial institutions, place agency examiners on-site within banks, recover pay from executives deemed responsible for an institution's failure, and the requirement of banks to create a 'Living Will' as a guide for orderly resolution.

In a fictional TV movie about the crises, Patricia Randell played Bair in the 2011 HBO movie Too Big to Fail, based on the popular book of the same name by New York Times journalist Andrew Ross Sorkin.

== 2020 COVID-19 pandemic ==
In March 2020, Bair called for the Federal Reserve to focus on getting credit flowing to U.S. businesses affected by the spreading coronavirus and workers losing their jobs. In an op-ed for the Financial Times, Bair called for the Federal Reserve and other central banks to require systemically important banks to suspend discretionary bonuses, dividends and shareholder buybacks in order to impede losses while expanding their balance sheets to support increased borrowing from businesses hurt by the pandemic. The Bank of England and European Central Bank subsequently pressed their banks to do so.

== Publications ==
Bair is a frequent contributor to the Financial Times, regularly providing expert opinion columns on topics such as banks, loans, and financial policy.

Her memoir of the financial crisis, Bull by the Horns: Fighting to Save Main Street from Wall Street and Wall Street from Itself, was published September 25, 2012. The book was a New York Times and Wall Street Journal best seller.

Bair has also written several books for young children in a series published by Albert Whitman called Money Tales. Her books encourage savings and teach money basics. They include: Rock, Brock and the Savings Shock (2006), Isabel's Car Wash (2011), Princess Persephone Loses the Castle (2021), Billy the Borrowing Blue Footed Booby (2023), Daisy Bubble: A Price Crash on Galapagos (2023), Princess Persephone and the Money Wizards (2023), Princess Persephone’s Dragon Ride Stand (2024), and Shark Scam (2025).

She has also written books for teens, including Bullies of Wall Street about the 2008 financial crisis and her latest book, How Not to Lose a Million Dollars (2026), which provides guidance to young adults on how to navigate the financial system, avoid traps, and build wealth.

- Bair, Sheila (2012). Bull by the horns : fighting to save Main Street from Wall Street and Wall Street from itself. New York: Free Press. ISBN 9781451672480. LCCN 2012039342.
- Bair, Sheila; illustrated by Judy Stead (2008). Isabel's car wash. Morton Grove, Illinois: Albert Whitman & Co. ISBN 9780807536520. LCCN 2007030956.
- Bair, Sheila; illustrated by Barry Gott (2006). Rock, Brock, and the savings shock. Morton Grove, Illinois: Albert Whitman & Co. ISBN 9780807570944. LCCN 2005026974.
- Bair, Sheila (2015). The Bullies of Wall Street. New York: Simon & Schuster. ISBN 9781481400879. LCCN 2014005948.
- Bair, Sheila; illustrated by Amy Zhing (2021). Billy the Borrowing Blue-Footed Booby. Morton Grove, Illinois: Albert Whitman & Co. ISBN 9780807508121. LCCN 2020054961.
- Bair, Sheila; illustrated by Manuela López (2021). Princess Persephone Loses the Castle. Morton Grove, Illinois: Albert Whitman & Co. ISBN 9780807566473. LCCN 2020054722.
- Bair, Sheila; illustrated by Amy Zhing (2022). Shark Scam. Morton Grove, Illinois: Albert Whitman & Co. ISBN 9780807508114. LCCN 2021056880.
- Bair, Sheila; illustrated by Manuela López (2022). Princess Persephone's Dragon Ride Stand. Morton Grove, Illinois: Albert Whitman & Co. ISBN 9780807566466. LCCN 2021056842.

== Personal life ==
Bair is married to Scott P. Cooper and has two children, Preston and Colleen.

Political offices
Preceded by Robert R. Davis	Commissioner of the Commodity Futures Trading Commission; 1991–1995	Succeeded by David D. Spears
Preceded by William Albrecht; Acting	Chairperson of the Commodity Futures Trading Commission; Acting; 1993	Succeeded by Barbara Holum; Acting
Preceded by Gregory Baer	Assistant Secretary of the Treasury for Financial Institutions; 2001–2002	Succeeded by Wayne Abernathy
Preceded by Martin Gruenberg; Acting	Chairperson of the Federal Deposit Insurance Corporation; 2006–2011	Succeeded by Martin Gruenberg
