= Cyrus Amir-Mokri =

American politician

Cyrus Amir-Mokri سيروس اميرمکری
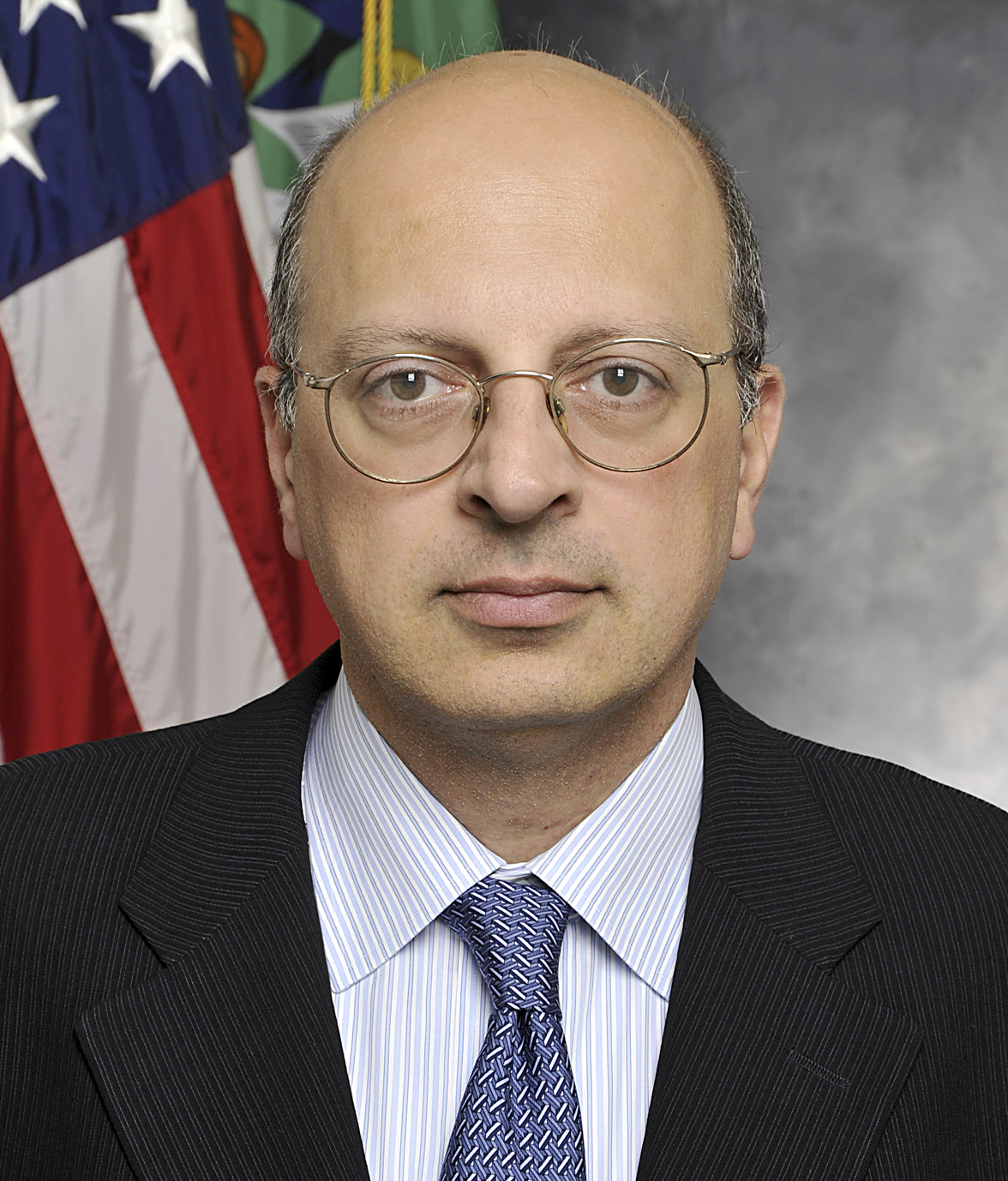

Assistant Secretary of the Treasury for Financial Institutions
- In office November 1, 2011 – November 1, 2014
- President: Barack Obama
- Preceded by: Michael Barr
- Succeeded by: Christopher Campbell

Personal details
- Born: 1964 (age 61–62) Tehran, Imperial State of Iran
- Party: Democratic
- Education: Harvard University (BA); University of Chicago (MA, PhD, JD)

Cyrus Amir-Mokri (Persian: سیروس امیرمکری) was the Assistant Secretary for Financial Institutions at the U.S. Treasury Department. He resigned from Treasury in April 2014.

Amir-Mokri was a senior legal and policy advisor to the Chairman of the Commodity Futures Trading Commission. He participated in the legislative process that led to the passage of the Dodd-Frank Act and the subsequent implementation through rulemaking. He also served as the agency's deputy representative to the Financial Stability Oversight Council and as liaison for inter-agency affairs. Amir-Mokri's previous experience in government was to serve as law clerk to Bruce M. Selya of the United States Court of Appeals for the First Circuit.

Before serving in government, Mr. Amir-Mokri was a partner at the law firm of Skadden, Arps, Slate, Meagher & Flom LLP, resident in its New York City office. He concentrated in complex commercial litigation and participated in many of the firm's high-profile litigation matters.

Currently he is working as General Counsel and Managing Director at JPMorgan Chase in New York.

Amir-Mokri is a recipient of the Ellis Island Medal of Honor, which is awarded for outstanding contributions by immigrants to the United States.

== Personal life ==
Amir-Mokri has lived in the United States since 1981 since his family immigrated from Iran following the 1979 Iranian revolution.

After attending Wayland Academy in Beaver Dam, Wisconsin for one year, Amir-Mokri attended Harvard College, graduating in 1986 with a degree in biochemistry. Amir-Mokri then studied history at the University of Chicago, where he concentrated principally on diplomatic and on modern Middle Eastern history. A recipient of a Mellon Foundation dissertation year fellowship, he authored a doctoral dissertation on Iranian constitutional history. Upon completing his doctoral studies, Amir-Mokri attended the University of Chicago Law School, from which he was graduated in 1995.

Government offices
Preceded by Michael Barr	Assistant Secretary of the Treasury for Financial Institutions; 2011–2014	Succeeded by Christopher Campbell
