= William P. Albrecht =

American economist (1935–2024)

Commissioner of the Commodity Futures Trading Commission
- In office November 22, 1988 – August 20, 1993
- Appointed by: Ronald Reagan; George H. W. Bush
- Preceded by: William E. Seale
- Succeeded by: John E. Tull Jr.

Chairman of the Commodity Futures Trading Commission (acting)
- In office January 22, 1993 – August 20, 1993
- Preceded by: Wendy Lee Gramm
- Succeeded by: Sheila Bair

Personal details
- Born: January 7, 1935; Pittsburgh, Pennsylvania, U.S.
- Died: October 30, 2024 (aged 89); Iowa City, Iowa, U.S.
- Political party: Democratic
- Spouse: Fran Jaecques (m. 1976)
- Children: 8
- Parents: William Price Albrecht Sr. (father); Jane Moses (mother)

William Price Albrecht Jr. (January 7, 1935 – October 30, 2024) was an American economist who served as a commissioner of the Commodity Futures Trading Commission from 1988 to 1993, including as acting chairman in 1993.

== Early life ==
Albrecht was born in Pittsburgh, Pennsylvania, on January 7, 1935, the son of William Price and Jane Moses Albrecht. His father was a professor of English at the University of New Mexico and the University of Kansas. The younger Albrecht received a bachelor's degree in philosophy from Princeton University in 1956 and served in the U.S. Navy from 1956 to 1961 before receiving a master's degree in economics from the University of South Carolina in 1962. He received another master's degree in economics in 1963 and a doctorate in economics in 1965 from Yale University.

== Career ==
Albrecht was hired by the University of Iowa, serving as an assistant professor (1965–1970), associate professor (1970–1982), and professor (1982–2007) of economics. While there, he served as an associate dean of the College of Business Administration from 1984 to 1988, the founder and director from 1999 to 2005 of the university's Institute for International Business, and the Justice Professor of International Business from 2000 to 2007. He also served as a visiting professor at the University of the Andes in Venezuela in 1986. Among a variety of academic works, he published a trio of economics textbooks (Economics, Macroeconomic Principles, and Microeconomic Principles), which were each published in four editions by Prentice Hall in the 1970s and 1980s.

He ran for Iowa's 1st congressional district in 1970, losing the Democratic nomination to State Representative Edward Mezvinsky, who went on lose to incumbent Republican Fred Schwengel, though Mezvinsky would win in a rematch in 1972. Albrecht went on to serve as a legislative assistant to U.S. Senator Dick Clark in 1974.

On October 13, 1988, President Ronald Reagan nominated Albrecht as a Democratic commissioner of the Commodity Futures Trading Commission. He received a recess appointment from Reagan on November 22, 1988, and Reagan renominated him to the post at the beginning of the following congress. President George H. W. Bush withdrew and resubmitted his nomination in August 1989, and he was confirmed by the senate on November 19, 1989, for a term expiring April 13, 1993. On January 22, 1993, Chairwoman Wendy Lee Gramm resigned from the commission, and Albrecht was selected by his fellow commissioners as acting chairman. He made it known that he was interested in being reappointed to the panel to become its chair on a permanent basis, but he faced criticism from fellow Democrats in congress, including Glenn English and Dick Durbin, over several deregulatory actions taken by the commission. After it became clear that he would not be renominated by President Bill Clinton, Albrecht resigned on August 20, 1993. While serving as the commission's delegate to the International Organization of Securities Commissions, he also faced criticism for having a high volume of international travel.

== Personal life and death ==
Albrecht married Fran Jaecques in Iowa City, on July 4, 1976. They had eight children. He died in Iowa City on October 30, 2024, at the age of 89.

== Electoral history ==
=== 1970 ===
United States House of Representatives, Iowa's 1st congressional district, 1970 primary Source:
Party	Candidate	Votes	%
Democratic	Edward Mezvinsky	8,806	43.93
Democratic	William P. Albrecht	6,213	31.00
Democratic	William Strout	5,024	25.06
Democratic	scattering	2	0.01
Total votes		20,045	100

== Works ==
- Albrecht, William P. (1962). Child Labor Legislation in South Carolina (Master's thesis). University of South Carolina.
- Albrecht, William P. (1965). The Relationship Between Wage Changes and Unemployment in Metropolitan and Industrial Labor Markets (Doctoral thesis). Yale University.
- Albrecht, William P. (March 1966). "The Prospects for Price Stability in 1966". Iowa Business Digest. 37.
- Albrecht, William P. (Winter 1970). "Intermarket and Intertemporal Differences in the Relationship Between Wage Changes and Unemployment". Mississippi Valley Journal of Business and Economics. 6 (2).
- Knoke, William; Albrecht, William P. (Winter 1970). "Economics of the Sweetener Industry". MSU Business Topics. 18 (4): 43–48.
- Kovarsky, Irving; Albrecht, William P. (1970). Black Employment: The Impact of Religion, Economic Theory, Politics, and Law. Iowa State University.
- Albrecht, William P.; Pogue, Thomas F.; Barnard, Jerald R. (1971). Iowa State Economic Development Policy Study. University of Iowa.
- Albrecht, William P. (1974). Economics. Prentice Hall.
- Albrecht, William P. (1974). Study Guide and Workbook: Economics. Prentice Hall.
- Albrecht, William P. (1977). "Why Regulation Fails". The Journal of Economics: 235–236.
- Albrecht, William P.; Pogue, Thomas (1978). "Changes in Taxes and Transfers: Implications for Stagflation". The Journal of Economics: 1–5.
- Albrecht, William P.; Pogue, Thomas (June 1978). "AFDC Tax Rates, Work Incentives, and Welfare Reform: A Comment". National Tax Journal. 31 (2): 91–95. doi:10.1086/NTJ41863111.
- Albrecht, William P. (1979). Macroeconomic Principles. Prentice Hall.
- Albrecht, William P. (1979). Microeconomic Principles. Prentice Hall.
- Albrecht, William P. (1980). "The New Regulation and the Theory of Economic Regulation". The Journal of Economics: 9–12.
- Albrecht, William P. (1982). "Welfare Reform: An Idea Whose Time Has Come and Gone". Welfare Reform in America: Perspectives and Prospects. Springer Publishing.
- Albrecht, William P. (September 1983). "The Deficit: Malignant or Benign?". The Iowa Economic Forecast.
- Albrecht, William P. (1987). "La Contribucion de Keynes a la Ciencia Economica". Instituto de Investigaciones Económicas y Sociales.
- Albrecht, William P. (Fall 1988). "The World's Largest Debtor". Iowa Business.
- Albrecht, William P. (May–June 1990). "Much Ado About Margins". FIA Review: 27–29.
- Albrecht, William P. (May 13, 1990). "Leave the Stock Index Futures Alone". The New York Times.
- Albrecht, William P. (June 1990). "A Trader's Fable: Once Upon a Time in Marketland". Commodities Law Letter: 6–7.
- Albrecht, William P. (1992). "Commodity Futures Trading Commission". The New Palgrave Dictionary of Money and Finance. Palgrave Macmillan.
- Albrecht, William P. (1993). "Regulatory Reform: A Research Agenda". Research Frontiers in Futures and Options: An Exchange of Ideas. University of Illinois Press.
- Albrecht, William P. (May–June 1993). "Cross Registration Border Check". Futures Industry: 15–17.
- Albrecht, William P. (August 1993). "How Many Regulators? How Many Regulations?". Managed Account Reports: 21–22.
- Albrecht, William P.; Bronfman, Corinne; Messenheimer, Harold C. (1995). "Regulatory Regimes: The Interdependence of Rules and Regulatory Structure". The Industrial Organization and Regulation of the Securities Industry. University of Chicago Press.
- Albrecht, William P. (1995). "Comment on Institutional and Regulatory Influences on Price Discovery in Cash and Futures Bond Markets". The Industrial Organization and Regulation of the Securities Industry. University of Chicago Press.
- Albrecht, William P. (Fall 1995). "Regulation of Exchange-Traded and OTC Derivatives: The Need for a Comparative Institution Approach". The Journal of Corporation Law. 21 (1): 111–129.
- Albrecht, William P. (1997). "Emerging Asian Markets: Evolution of Derivatives Exchanges". Catalyst Institute Update.
- Albrecht, William P. (March 1998). "Should International Capital Flows Be Regulated?". The Financial Regulator. 2 (4): 26–29.
- Albrecht, William P. (February–March 1999). "Reforming US Regulatory Structure". Futures Industry: 14–16.
- Albrecht, William P. (May 1999). "The Evolution of Derivatives Exchanges in Asia's Emerging Markets: Some Observations and Lessons". Futures and Derivatives Law Report. 19 (3): 1–12.
- Albrecht, William P. (February 2001). "The Development of Derivative Products in Asian Capital Markets". ASAF Electronic Journal: 8–13.
