= Wendy Lee Gramm =

American politician

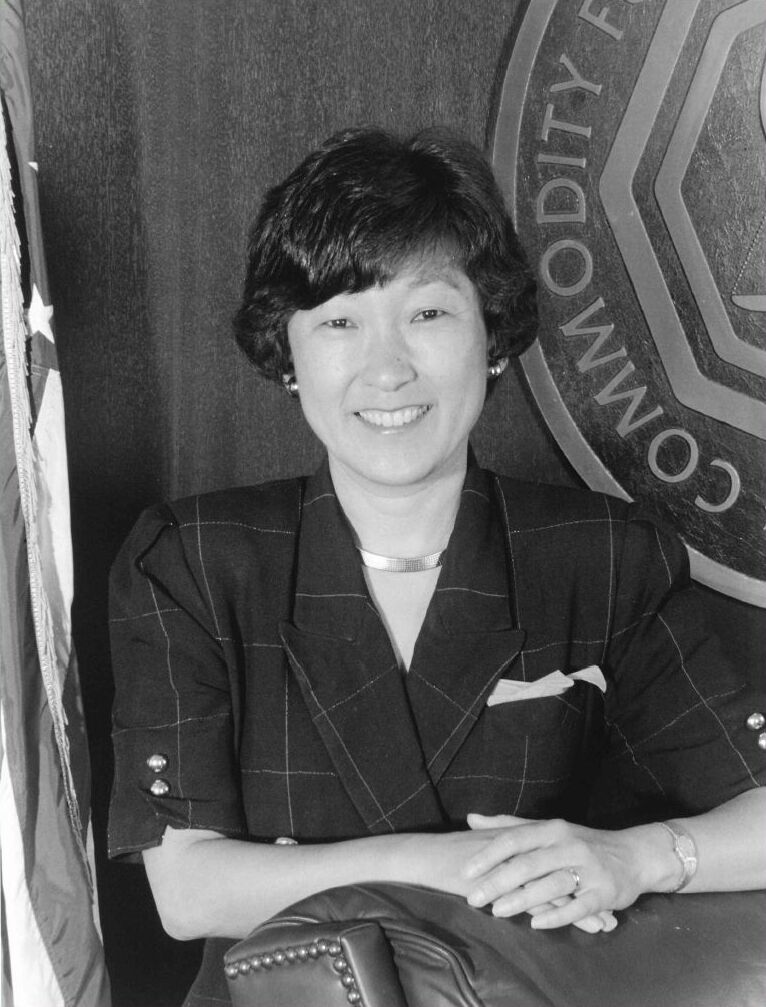
- Official portrait, 1988

Member of the Commodity Futures Trading Commission
- In office April 15, 1985 – April 15, 1995
- President: Ronald Reagan; George H. W. Bush; Bill Clinton

Chairperson of the Commodity Futures Trading Commission
- In office February 22, 1988 – January 22, 1993
- President: Ronald Reagan; George H. W. Bush; Bill Clinton
- Preceded by: Susan M. Phillips
- Succeeded by: William P. Albrecht (Acting)

Personal details
- Born: Wendy Lee; January 10, 1945 (age 81) Territory of Hawaii
- Spouse: Phil Gramm
- Education: Wellesley College (BA); Northwestern University (PhD)
- Occupation: Economist, scholar

Wendy Lee Gramm (born January 10, 1945) is an American economist who led the Commodity Futures Trading Commission during the Reagan administration. She is also the wife of former United States Senator Phil Gramm. Gramm has gained notoriety for her role in the Enron scandal.

== Early life ==
Wendy Lee Gramm was born in Hawaii and is of Korean and Native Hawaiian ancestry. She received a B.A. degree in economics from Wellesley College in 1966 and a Ph.D. in economics from Northwestern University in 1971. In her role at the Mercatus Center, Gramm generally called for deregulation of the energy industry. For eight years, Gramm taught in the Department of Economics at Texas A&M University and later served on the Texas A&M University System Board of Regents.

== Career ==
Wendy Lee Gramm held several positions in the Reagan administration: executive director of the Presidential Task Force on Regulatory Relief, head of the White House Office of Management and Budget's regulatory review office, director of the Federal Trade Commission's Bureau of Economics, head of the Office of Management and Budget's Office of Information and Regulatory Affairs (OIRA) from 1985 to 1988, and head of the Commodity Futures Trading Commission from 1988 to 1993. After a lobbying campaign from Enron and the election of Bill Clinton, Gramm nearly lost her chair seat, but the CFTC exempted Enron from regulation in trading of energy derivatives. Six days later, she resigned from CFTC, took a seat on the Enron board of directors, and served on its audit committee.

Her husband's 1996 presidential bid was cut short by a political scandal arising from his past investments in the porn industry, which led the New York Post to nickname him "Porno Gramm".

While on the board of directors, she received donations from Enron to support the Mercatus Center. According to Public Citizen, Enron paid between $915,000 and $1.85 million in salary from 1993 to 2001. Enron also became the biggest donor to Phil Gramm's political actions. Just under $100,000 went to his campaigns between 1999 and 2001. In 1999, the Gramm–Leach–Bliley Act was passed, which repealed part of the Glass–Steagall Act of 1933, prohibiting any institution from acting as any combination of an investment bank, a commercial bank, and an insurance company. It allowed over-the-counter trading of derivatives, which had previously been restricted to regulated exchanges.

In 1998, she declared "In my view, there are no systemic problems in the OTC derivatives market”. In 1999, she sold her shares of Enron ($300,000), asserting that being a director and a shareholder of the company constituted a conflict of interest.

Prior to George W. Bush's election, Phil Gramm introduced the Commodity Futures Modernization Act which deregulated the trading of derivatives.

After news of the Enron scandal became public in October 2001, Gramm and the other directors of the energy company were named in several investor lawsuits, many of which have been settled. In particular, Gramm and other Enron directors agreed to a $168 million settlement in a suit from the University of California. As part of it, the directors agreed to collectively pay $13 million to settle claims of insider trading. The remainder of the settlement was to be paid by insurance.

After Enron, she became head of the Regulatory Studies Program of the Mercatus Center. She expressed no regrets regarding the Enron debacle, which she considered a success. On November 1, 2007, she became the chairperson of the Texas Public Policy Foundation. In 2011, she appeared on a television spot with her husband, calling on Texans to shoulder the burden of the economic crisis. On October 1, 2019, she resigned as the chairman of the Texas Public Policy Foundation.

Gramm also served as a director of the Independent Women's Forum, a conservative women's group. She has sat on the boards of Enron Corporation, Iowa Beef Processors, Invesco Funds, Longitude, the Chicago Mercantile Exchange, and State Farm Insurance Companies.

Ronald Reagan once described Gramm as "[his] favorite economist."

== Personal life ==
Wendy Lee Gramm met her husband when she was interviewed by him as a Ph.D. student for a position at Texas A&M University. Phil Gramm, a senior professor three years older than Wendy, expressed his interest in her after the interview. Six weeks later, she arrived on campus, and they wed.

She has two sons: Jeff, who is in the indie-rock band Aden, and Marshall, a professor of economics at the Presbyterian-affiliated Rhodes College, Thoroughbred owner and player.
