= Algorithmic Contract Types Unified Standards =

System for financial contracts

Algorithmic Contract Types Unified Standards (ACTUS) is an attempt to create a globally accepted set of definitions and a way of representing almost all financial contracts. Such standards are regarded as important for transaction processing, risk management, financial regulation, the tokenization of financial instruments, and the development of smart contracts for decentralized finance (DeFi) using blockchain technology. ACTUS is used as a reference standard by the Office of Financial Research (OFR), an arm of the US Treasury.

== History ==
The difficulty of defining and analyzing financial data were described by Willi Brammertz and his co-authors in a 2009 book, Unified Financial Analysis: The missing links of finance. The simplicity of the problem is described in an ECB paper, "Modelling metadata in central banks". This cites the issue of how financial institutions have tried to overcome data silos by building enterprise-wide data warehouses. However, while these data warehouses physically integrate different sources of data, they do not conceptually unify them. For example, a single concept like notional value still might be captured in various ways in fields that might be labeled 'nominal value', 'current principal', 'par value' or 'balance'. Standardization of data would improve internal bank operations, and offer the possibility of large-scale financial risk analytics by leveraging Big Data technology. Key to this is the idea of "contract types".

The concepts were expanded upon by Brammertz and Allan I. Mendelowitz in a 2018 paper in the Journal of Risk Finance. They describe the need for software that turns natural language contracts into algorithms – smart contracts – that can automate financial processes using blockchain technology. Financial contracts define exchanges of payments or cashflows that follow certain patterns; in fact 31 patterns cover most contracts. Underlying these contracts there must be a data dictionary that standardizes contract terms. In addition, the smart contracts need access to information representing the state of the world and which affects contractual obligations. This information would include variables such as market risk and counterparty risk factors held in online databases that are outside the blockchain (sometimes called "oracles").

The idea of the standardized algorithmic representation of financial contracts, however, is independent of and predates blockchain technology and digital currencies. In fact, also Nick Szabo's definition of smart contracts dates back to 1994. However, it is highly relevant for blockchains or distributed ledgers and the concept of smart contracts. Brammertz and Mendelowitz argue in a 2019 paper that without standards, the chaos around data in banks today would proliferate on blockchains, because every contract could be written individually. They further argue that of the four conditions set by Szabo, blockchains will usually fulfill only one, namely observability.

The authors argue that the adoption of a standard for smart contracts and financial data would reduce the cost of operations for financial firms, provide a computational infrastructure for regulators, reduce regulatory reporting costs, and improve market transparency. Also, it would enable the assessment of systemic risk by directly quantifying the interconnectedness of firms.

These ideas led to the ACTUS proposal for a data standard alongside an algorithmic standard. Together, these can describe most financial instruments through 31 contract types or modular templates. The ACTUS Financial Research Foundation and the ACTUS Users Association develop the structure to implement the ideas. The also control the intellectual property and development approaches. Specifications are developed, maintained, and released on GitHub.

In October 2021, ACTUS was added as the second reference after ISO 20022 to a database run by the Office of Financial Research, an arm of the US Treasury. ACTUS is being used to help define five asset classes (equities, debt, options, warrants, and futures) in the OFR's financial instrument reference database (FIRD). A third reference, the Financial Information eXchange (FIX) messaging standard, was added a year later. In 2023, ACTUS became a liaison member of ISO TC68 / SC9.

== ACTUS implementation ==
ACTUS has been implemented as a set of royalty-free, open standards for representing financial contracts. The standards combine three elements. First, a concise data dictionary that defines the terms present in a particular type of financial contract. Second, a simple but complete taxonomy of the fundamental algorithmic contract type patterns. These incorporate the parts of the data dictionary that apply to a given contract type. Finally, the reference code in Java which calculates the cash flow obligations which are established by the contract so they can be accurately projected, analyzed and acknowledged by all parties over the life of the contract.

Providing an open standard for the data elements and algorithms of contracts provides consistency first within financial institutions and second when sharing data among organizations in the finance industry. This data may be used to consolidate the views of product lines within a firm, to manage obligations between institutions, or to meet reporting obligations set by regulators. In addition, ACTUS can assist in the tokenization of financial instruments, and the development of smart contracts for decentralized finance (DeFi) using blockchain. For example, ACTUS contracts have been coded in the Marlowe smart contracts language.
