= Robert R. Davis =

Robert R. "Bob" Davis

Commissioner of the Commodity Futures Trading Commission
- In office October 3, 1984 – April 30, 1990
- President: Ronald Reagan; George H. W. Bush
- Preceded by: Philip M. Johnson
- Succeeded by: Sheila Bair

Personal details
- Born: April 3, 1949 (age 75); Atlanta
- Political party: Republican
- Education: Virginia Tech (B.A., M.A., Ph.D.)

Robert R. Davis (born April 3, 1949) is an American economist and trade association executive. A longtime executive at the American Bankers Association and its predecessor, America's Community Bankers, Davis served for five and a half years as a member of the Commodity Futures Trading Commission.

== Early life and education ==
Davis was born in Atlanta in 1949. He studied at Virginia Tech, receiving his B.A. in 1972, an M.A. in 1974, and a Ph.D. in economics in 1977. During the 1975–76 school year, he was a visiting assistant professor of economics at Vanderbilt University.

== Government service ==
From 1977 to 1979, Davis was a financial economist at the Federal Deposit Insurance Corporation. He worked at Harris Trust and Savings Bank in Chicago as international economist from 1979 to 1984, at which time he returned to Washington to work as senior economist on the Joint Economic Committee.

President Ronald Reagan announced his intent to nominate Davis for a seat on the CFTC in July 1984. Davis was confirmed by a voice vote in the Senate on September 28, 1984, and took his seat on the Commission on October 3. At the CFTC, Davis worked to update regulations on hedging and risk management, initiated a review of OTC derivatives and swaps, and helped oversee the regulatory response to the 1987 stock market crash.

== Private sector ==
After leaving the CFTC in April 1990, Davis joined the New York Mercantile Exchange as senior vice president. In 1993, he joined America's Community Banks—a trade group for thrifts and mutual banks—as executive vice president and director of government relations. At ACB, Davis led the organization's policy engagement on the Gramm–Leach–Bliley Act, the Deposit Insurance Funds Act of 1996, and the 1996 tax bill.

After ACB merged into the American Bankers Association in 2007, Davis remained as executive vice president overseeing housing and mortgage market policy development, GSE policy, minority bank issues, bank fraud and risk management, as well as mutual institutions. Before his retirement in 2020, Davis spearheaded an award-winning ABA initiative based on the MStar risk mapping tool to establish a shared classification for cybersecurity risks and scenarios.
