= Michael Barr (U.S. official) =

American legal academic (born 1965/1966)

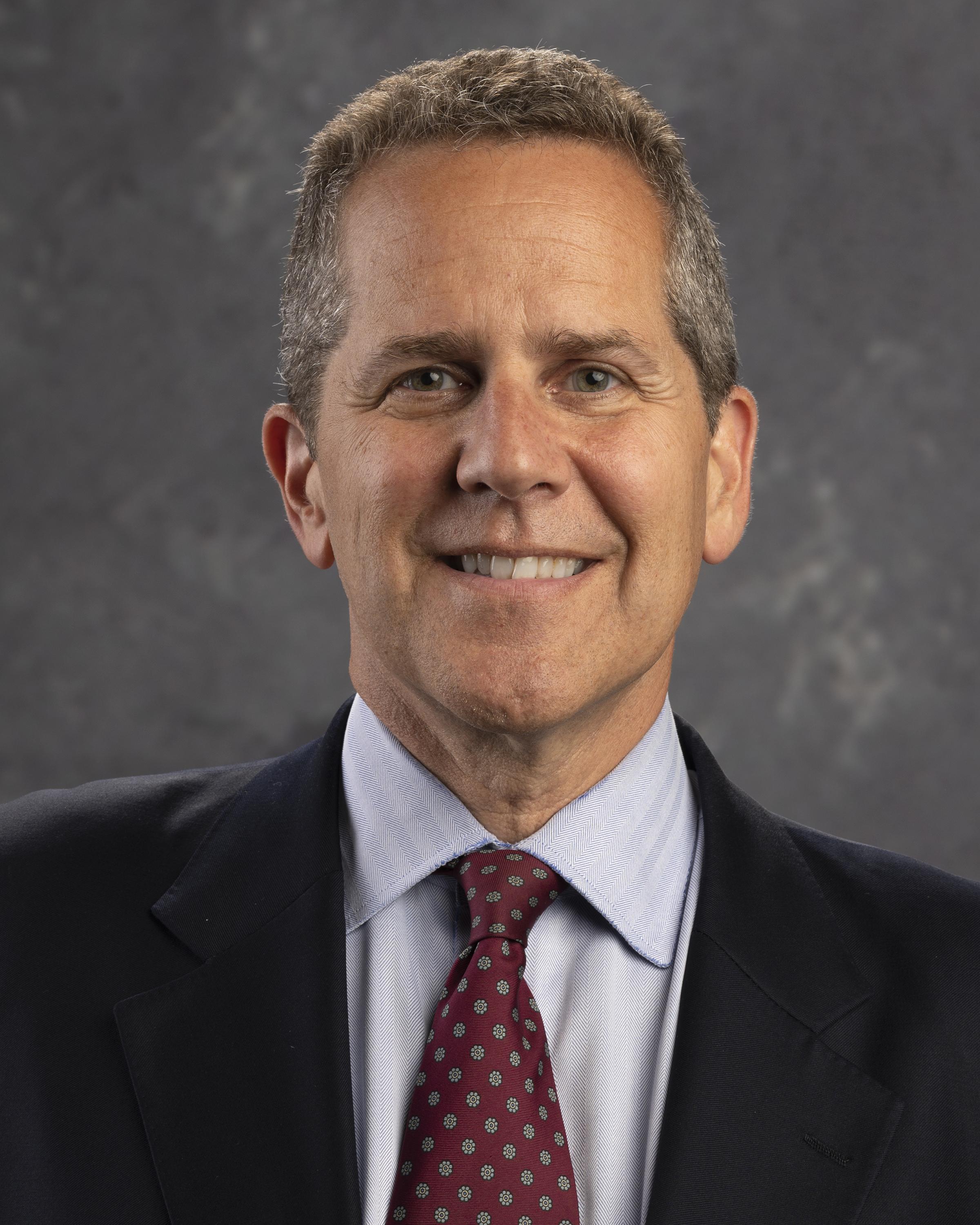
- Official portrait, 2022

Vice Chair of the Federal Reserve for Supervision
- In office July 19, 2022 – February 28, 2025
- President: Joe Biden; Donald Trump
- Preceded by: Randal Quarles
- Succeeded by: Michelle Bowman

Member of the Federal Reserve Board of Governors
- Incumbent
- Assumed office July 19, 2022
- President: Joe Biden; Donald Trump
- Preceded by: Randal Quarles

Under Secretary of the Treasury for Domestic Finance
- Acting; May 2009 – March 27, 2010
- President: Barack Obama
- Preceded by: Anthony Ryan (acting)
- Succeeded by: Jeffrey A. Goldstein

Assistant Secretary of the Treasury for Financial Institutions
- In office May 2009 – January 2011
- President: Barack Obama
- Preceded by: David Nason
- Succeeded by: Cyrus Amir-Mokri

Personal details
- Born: Michael Solomon Barr; October 6, 1965 (age 60) Washington, D.C., U.S.
- Party: Democratic
- Spouse: Hannah Smotrich
- Children: 3
- Education: Yale University (BA, JD); Magdalen College, Oxford (MPhil)

Michael Solomon Barr (born October 6, 1965) is an American legal scholar who has been serving as a member of the Federal Reserve Board of Governors since 2022. Barr served as second Vice Chair for Supervision of the Federal Reserve from 2022 to 2025. From 2009 to 2011, he was assistant secretary of the treasury for financial institutions under President Barack Obama. At the University of Michigan, he has been serving as faculty member since 2001, professor of law since 2006, professor of public policy since 2014, on leave while serving as governor of the Federal Reserve.

Previously, Barr served as dean at the University of Michigan Gerald R. Ford School of Public Policy and faculty director of the University of Michigan's Center on Finance, Law, and Policy. Barr is a fellow of the National Academy of Public Administration.

== Early life and education ==
Barr attended Yale College and graduated summa cum laude with honors in history in 1987. At Yale, he won the New Prize for public service and the Gries Prize for his senior history thesis, "The Black Consciousness Movement in South Africa". He went on to earn his M.Phil. in international relations in 1989 as a Rhodes Scholar at Magdalen College, Oxford. His thesis was on Panama–United States relations.

Barr returned to Yale Law School to earn a Juris Doctor in 1992. He was a co-recipient of the American Immigration Lawyers Association (AILA) Human Rights Award and recipient of the Charles G. Albom Prize for appellate advocacy during his time at Yale Law School.

== Career ==
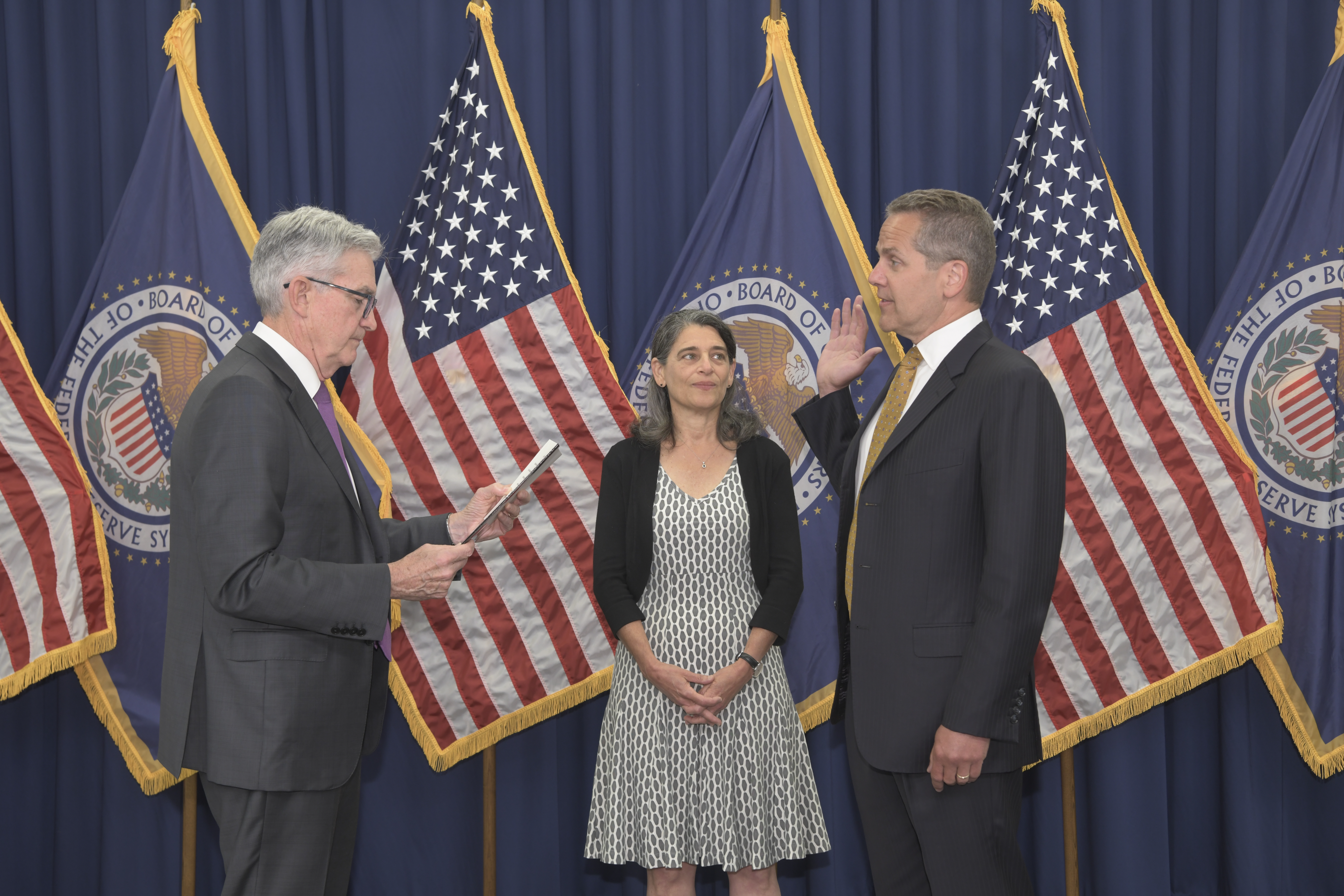
Barr (right) sworn in as vice chair of the Federal Reserve for Supervision in 2022

=== Government ===
After graduating from Yale in 1992, Barr worked as a law clerk for Judge Pierre N. Leval in the U.S. District Court for the United States District Court for the Southern District of New York. He moved to the U.S. Supreme Court to clerk for Associate Justice David Souter in 1993. In 1994, he joined the Policy Planning Staff of the United States Department of State as a special advisor and counselor. From 1995 to 1997, he was a special assistant to Secretary Robert Rubin, and then deputy assistant secretary of the Treasury for community development policy from 1997 to 2001. At the Treasury Department, he helped to design the Community Development Financial Institutions Fund and established the Office of Community Development. Barr was concurrently a special advisor to President Bill Clinton from 1999 to 2001. In the Clinton administration, he also worked to protect the Community Reinvestment Act and launch the New Markets Tax Credit. He formed an interagency working group to advance fair lending across the banking agencies and the Department of Justice.

From 2009 to 2010, while on leave from the University of Michigan Law School, Barr returned to the Department of the Treasury as assistant secretary of the treasury for financial institutions. In this position, he was a key architect of the Dodd–Frank Wall Street Reform and Consumer Protection Act of 2010. He played a central role in developing the Consumer Financial Protection Bureau and policies to expand access to capital for small businesses. He also helped to develop and enact the Credit CARD Act of 2009. In 2010, he was awarded the Alexander Hamilton Award for Distinguished Leadership, the Treasury's highest honor. He was considered for a position on the Federal Reserve Board of Governors in 2014 and as director of the Consumer Financial Protection Bureau in 2010. He was a proponent of the Volcker Rule, rules limiting the pre-emption of state consumer protection laws, and the closure of the industrial loan company loophole. Because the Dodd-Frank Act faced significant opposition from regulators, moderates and the financial sector, Barr was described as "Wall Street's nemesis" by Bloomberg Businessweek.

In November 2020, Barr was named a volunteer member of the Joe Biden presidential transition Agency Review Team to support transition efforts related to the United States Department of the Treasury. In January 2021, The Wall Street Journal reported that Biden was expected to pick Barr as Comptroller of the Currency.

=== Academia and research ===
Returning to the University of Michigan, Barr established and directed the Center on Finance, Law, and Policy, a university-wide interdisciplinary research center on financial policy and regulation, financial products and services, and management of financial institutions.

In 2015, Barr helped to create the Entrepreneurs of Color Fund, which provides loan capital to minority entrepreneurs in Detroit. He also co-founded the Detroit Neighborhood Entrepreneurs Project (DNEP) at the University of Michigan in 2016. The DNEP is an interdisciplinary clinic that connects students and faculty from the law school, the Stephen M. Ross School of Business, the Penny W. Stamps School of Art & Design and the University of Michigan College of Engineering to help entrepreneurs develop their small businesses.

On August 1, 2017, Barr began a five-year appointment as the Joan and Sanford Weill Dean of Public Policy at the University of Michigan's Gerald R. Ford School of Public Policy. He is a non-resident scholar at the Brookings Institution and is an advisor to the Clinton Global Initiative. He has been a visiting professor at the University of Pennsylvania Law School. In 2014, he was named the Roy F. and Jean Humphrey Proffitt Professor of Law.

Barr has completed research in the areas of financial regulation and financial inclusion. He has published over 100 books and articles on the topic. His books also suggest public policy recommendations for making the financial system more stable and fairer for low-income people. His first book, Building Inclusive Financial Systems, published in 2007, is about the obstacles that households, the rural poor and micro-enterprises face when trying to meet their financial needs.

In 2009, Barr published Insufficient Funds, which was co-edited by the former Ford School dean, Rebecca Blank. The book is about the results of a 1,000-person, in-depth field research study conducted in Detroit. It found that low-income families pay more for financial services and supplement mainstream banking services with alternative lenders, such as payday lenders and pawn shops.

Barr's book, No Slack: The Financial Lives of Low-Income Americans, was published in 2012 and is also about the Detroit research study. It contains anecdotes from the interviewees and recommendations for improving the financial health of low- and moderate-income people.

In 2016, Barr co-authored a law school casebook with Margaret E. Tahyar and Howell Jackson called Financial Regulation: Law & Policy. A second edition was published in 2018, and a third in 2021.

=== Federal Reserve ===
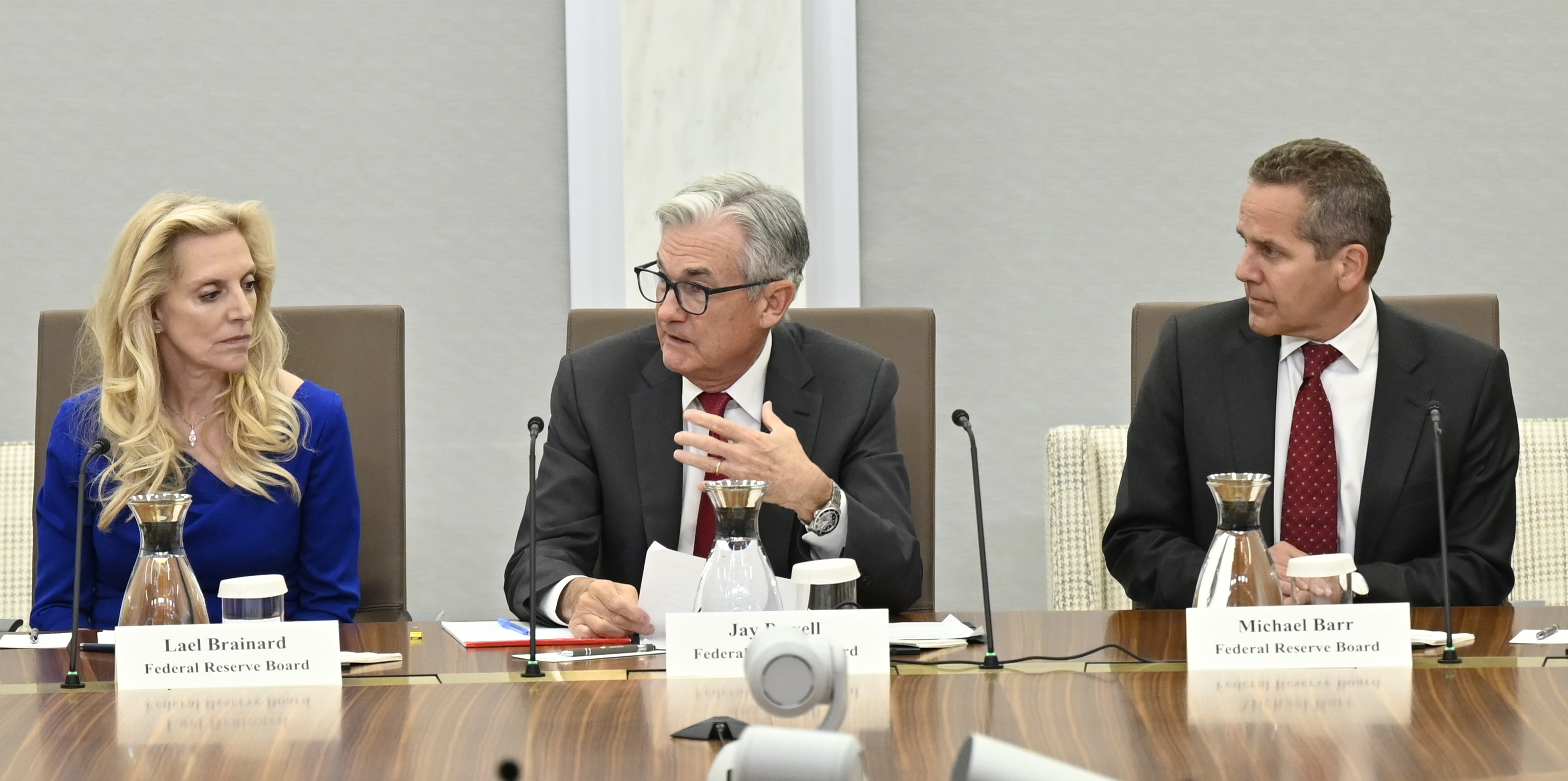
Barr (right) with Federal Reserve Vice Chair Lael Brainard and Chair Jerome Powell in 2022

On April 15, 2022, Barr was announced by President Joe Biden as his nominee for the Federal Reserve, to take the position of Vice Chair for Supervision of the Federal Reserve, following the failed nomination of Sarah Bloom Raskin. Barr was confirmed 66–28 as both Federal Reserve governor and vice chair for supervision on July 13, 2022, and sworn in on July 19, 2022.

On January 6, 2025, the Federal Reserve Board announced that Barr would be resigning from his position as Vice Chair for Supervision effective on February 28, 2025 and that he would continue to serve as a governor. Barr remains on leave from the University of Michigan.

== Political positions ==
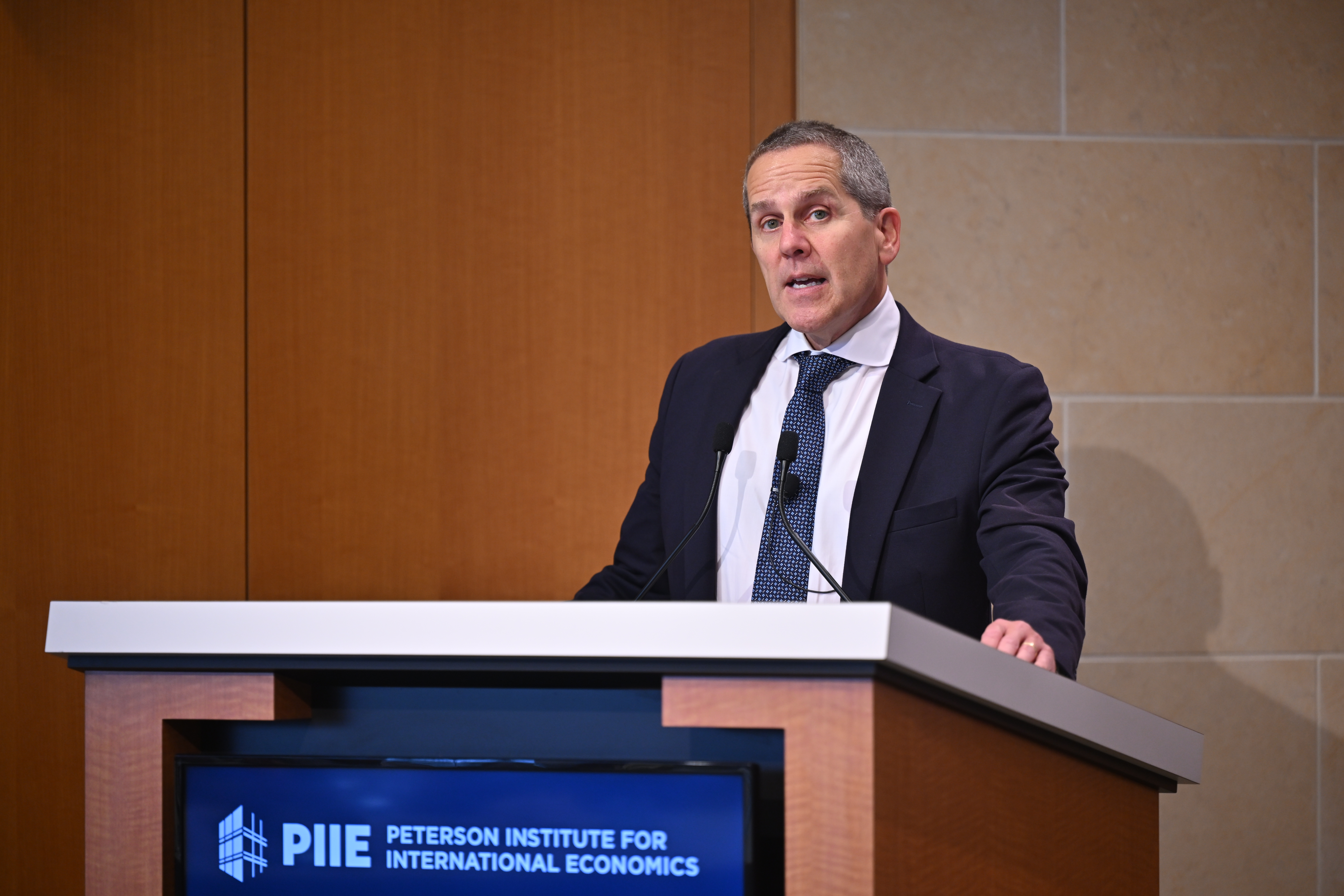
Barr speaks at the Peterson Institute for International Economics in 2025

While at the Department of the Treasury, Barr publicly opposed tougher derivatives regulations, resulting in criticism from the progressive wing of the Democratic Party. Barr opposed what he saw as efforts to overturn financial regulations put in place by the Dodd–Frank Act during American trade talks with the European Union. Barr has defended the legacy of former Treasury Secretary Timothy Geithner, arguing that he helped "save this Nation, and the global economy, from another Great Depression."

== Personal life ==
Barr is married to graphic designer Hannah Smotrich, with whom he has three children. Barr has served as an advisor to multiple public policy organizations and initiatives, including the Brookings Institution, the Federal Deposit Insurance Corporation (FDIC) Advisory Committee on Economic Inclusion, the Bill & Melinda Gates Foundation, and the Washington Center for Equitable Growth. In addition to his academic work, Barr serves as a non-resident senior fellow at the Center for American Progress, a liberal think tank.

== See also ==
- List of law clerks for the third seat of the Supreme Court of the United States

Political offices
Preceded by David Nason	Assistant Secretary of the Treasury for Financial Institutions; 2009–2011	Succeeded by Cyrus Amir-Mokri
Preceded by Anthony Ryan; Acting	Under Secretary of the Treasury for Domestic Finance; Acting; 2009–2010	Succeeded by Jeffrey A. Goldstein
Government offices
Preceded by Randal Quarles	Member of the Federal Reserve Board of Governors; 2022–present	Incumbent
Preceded by Randal Quarles	Vice Chair of the Federal Reserve for Supervision; 2022–2025	Succeeded by Michelle Bowman
