= Emil Henry =

American business leader and public policy expert

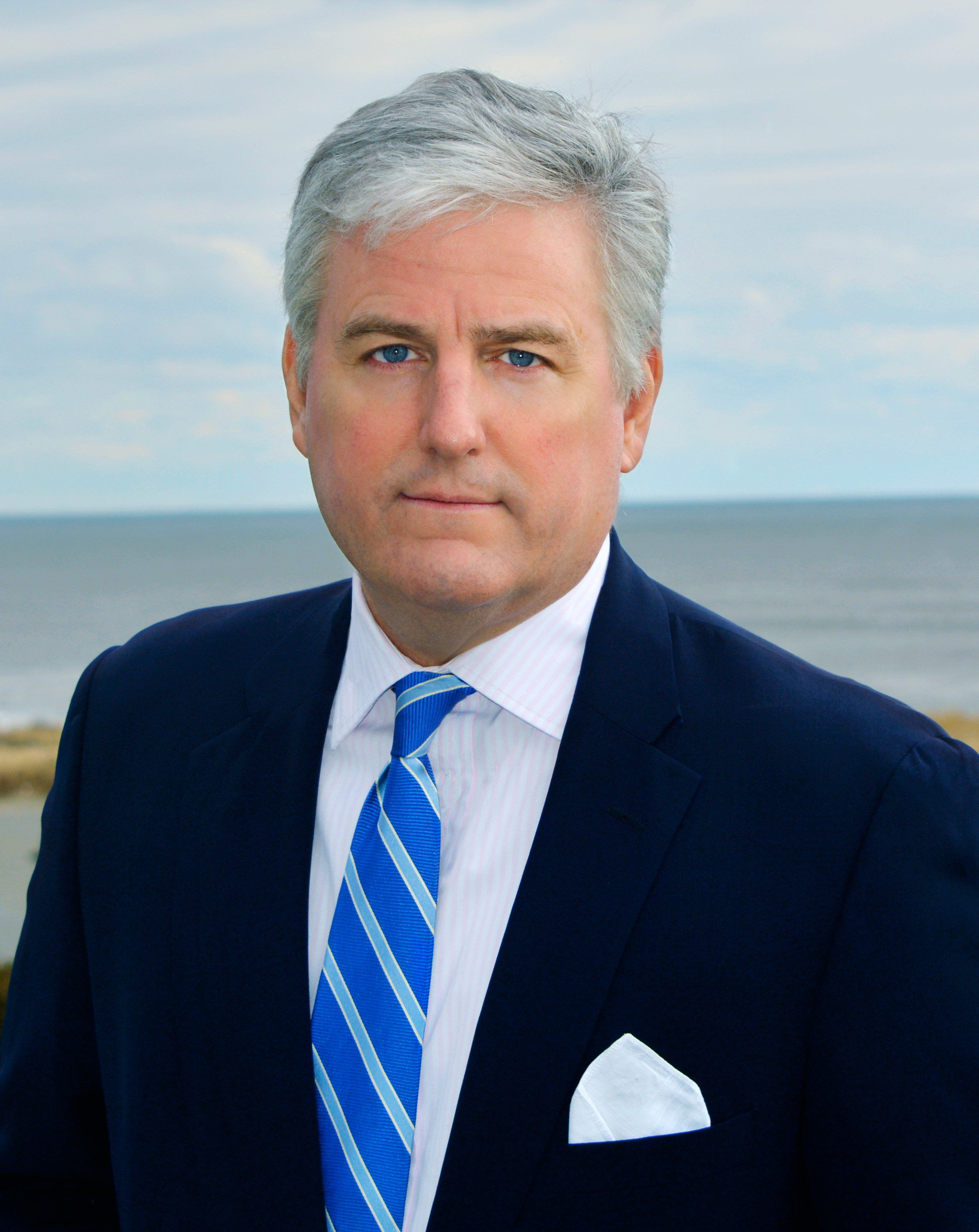
Emil Henry

Emil W. Henry, Jr. (born December 28, 1960) is an American business leader and public policy expert on economics, financial institutions, capital markets, and financial regulation. He is a former Assistant Secretary for Financial Institutions of the U.S. Treasury Department serving from 2005 to 2007 under Secretaries John Snow and Hank Paulson. He is the CEO and Managing Partner of Henry Tiger LLC and Tiger Infrastructure Partners, a private equity firm.

Upon his departure from the Treasury, Hank Paulson awarded Henry the U.S. Treasury Department's highest honor, the Alexander Hamilton Award.

Henry holds a bachelor's degree from Yale University and an MBA from Harvard Business School.

== Early life and education ==
Henry was born in Memphis, Tennessee. He graduated from Yale University in 1983 with a B.A. in Economics, cum laude, and from the Harvard Business School in 1987.

At Yale, Henry was a member of the famed The Whiffenpoofs, America's oldest a cappella singing group.

Henry met his wife, Jody Cregan Henry, at Yale University where she also graduated in 1983. They live in New York City and East Hampton, NY and have three children: Madeleine, Parker, and Emil III.

His parents, also from Memphis, have been politically active. Henry's father, E. William Henry, served as Chairman of the Federal Communications Commission from 1962-66.

His mother, Sherrye Patton Henry, a well-known author, radio personality and feminist activist, was appointed by President Clinton to head the Women's Business Ownership of the SBA. For 15 years she hosted the Sherrye Henry Program on WOR radio in New York City. She hosted WOMAN! On WCBS-TV. She was author of “The Deep Divide, Why Women Resist Equality”.

== Business career ==
Henry has been a financial executive for over 30 years. He is currently CEO of private equity firm Henry Tiger LLC and Tiger Infrastructure Partners in which hedge fund titan Julian Roberston was a seed investor. From 2007-2008, Henry was the Global Head of a Lehman Brothers’ private equity investment business. From 1990-2005, Henry was a partner and Chairman of Asset Management for Gleacher Partners, a global investment firm. From 1987-1990 Henry was a member of the principal investment arm of Morgan Stanley in New York City where he executed private equity investments.

== Government Service and Political Activities ==
Henry is politically active and a prominent member of the Republican Party.

Henry was appointed by President George W. Bush as Assistant Secretary of the Treasury for Financial Institutions. In October, 2005, Henry was unanimously confirmed by the U.S. Senate. As a member of Secretary Snow's and Secretary Paulson's senior team, Henry led a number of initiatives including the Treasury Department's activities in financial, capital markets, and regulatory policy. He coordinated the President's Working Group on Financial Markets, developed administration policy on hedge funds and derivatives, and led initiatives to reform Fannie Mae and Freddie Mac and overall financial regulatory structure. He led the Department's efforts to develop emergency response protocols in the event of a financial crisis.

Henry was an ardent reformer of the GSEs, Fannie Mae and Freddie Mac, and is recognized as the first public official to outline publicly and prior to the financial crisis the systemic risks presented by the GSEs.

Henry was designated by Secretary Paulson to serve on the boards of the National Gallery of Art in Washington, DC and the Securities Investor Protection Corporation Securities Investor Protection Corporation (SIPC), which oversees member broker-dealers and restores funds to investors from bankrupt and otherwise financially troubled US brokerage and securities firms.

Upon Henry's departure from the Treasury, Secretary Paulson said “Emil is a consummate team player. He has always put the Department and his duties as a public servant before himself.” and praised him for taking on the additional duties of the Assistant Secretary for Financial Markets. “One job is a handful; two an unprecedented commitment. He managed both jobs with excellence”, Paulson said.

Henry has been active in Republican politics including the 2012 Romney presidential campaign where he was an economic adviser, media surrogate, and member of the transition team. He was a delegate for Mitt Romney at the 2012 Republican National Convention in Tampa Florida.

In 2009, Ed Cox, the New York State Republican Chairman, reached out to Henry to consider running for Governor and courted him intensively. The potential for a strong Henry candidacy prompted Cox to lobby Rudy Giuliani to consider running for US Senate rather than Governor. .

== Notable Statements ==
Henry has given numerous speeches, lectures and interviews and has been profiled in television and print media on a variety of financial and political topics. Among the places he's been interviewed or published commentary are CNN, FOX, MSNBC, CNBC, Bloomberg, the Wall St. Journal, National Review, The American Spectator, and The Financial Times.

In a June, 2006 speech before the Housing Policy Council, Henry correctly warned of the potential for a financial crisis with the GSEs (Fannie Mae and Freddie at the center): “…these types of concerns are not simply theoretical. Like the case of a single gunshot setting off an avalanche, there are times when even seemingly modest or localized events in particular financial markets can trigger adverse consequences of enormous proportions”... “we at the Treasury are confident we are not simply "crying wolf"”, and “Do we really want to be faced with unwarranted and irresponsible calls for bailing out another failed GSE?”.

The GSEs were bailed out in October 2008.

In an April 2006 speech, Henry correctly questioned whether “our large financial institutions properly value and disclose their derivative exposure”.

Government offices
Preceded by Wayne A. Abernathy	Assistant Secretary of the Treasury for Financial Institutions; 2005-07	Succeeded by David Nason
