= Allan I. Mendelowitz =

American economist

Allan I. Mendelowitz is the former chairman and director of the Federal Housing Finance Board, which regulates the Federal Home Loan Bank System.

== Biography ==
Mendelowitz received his undergraduate degree from Columbia University in 1966 and his master's and Ph.D. from Northwestern University in 1971.

In 1980, he was the representative of the Comptroller General on the Chrysler Corporation Loan Guarantee Board. He also has been a Brookings Institution Economic Policy Fellow and was a faculty member of the economics department at Rutgers University.

He served as managing director for International Trade, Finance and Economic Competitiveness of the General Accounting Office from 1981 to 1995. From 1996 to 1998, he was executive vice president of the Export–Import Bank of the United States.

On September 28, 1999, Mendelowitz was named executive director of the Trade Deficit Review Commission by Commission Chairman Murray Weidenbaum. In this position, he directed the staff of the commission and assisted the members in preparing the commission's report on the causes and consequences of trade deficit.

In June 2000, he was nominated to the Federal Housing Finance Board by President Bill Clinton. He served as the board's chairman from December 2000 to June 2001. He was reappointed to the board by President George W. Bush and served for two terms until the board's dissolution.

In 2009, he was co-leader of the Committee to Establish the National Institute of Finance and helped write the legislation to create the Office of Financial Research within the United States Department of the Treasury.
