= Office of Financial Research =

Office in the U.S. Treasury Department

- OFR
- Seal of the U.S. Department of the Treasury

Agency overview
- Formed: July 21, 2010; 16 years ago
- Jurisdiction: Federal government of the United States
- Headquarters: 717 14th Street, NW Washington, DC 20005
- Employees: 196(2025)
- Annual budget: US$88.1 million (FY 2023)
- Agency executive: Lincoln Foran, Acting Director
- Parent agency: United States Department of the Treasury
- Key document: Dodd–Frank Wall Street Reform and Consumer Protection Act
- Website: www.financialresearch.gov

The Office of Financial Research (OFR) is an independent bureau reporting to the United States Department of the Treasury. Created in the aftermath of the 2008 financial crisis, the OFR monitors and collects data to identify risks across the financial system.

It was established by the Dodd–Frank Wall Street Reform and Consumer Protection Act, whose passage in 2010 was a legislative response to the 2008 financial crisis and the Great Recession. The OFR is funded by fees from large financial institutions.

The OFR is tasked with (1) collecting and standardizing data, (2) performing applied research and essential long-term research; and (3) developing risk measurement and monitoring tools. The OFR is also responsible for providing support to the Financial Stability Oversight Council (FSOC).

The Republican Party has criticized the OFR as being wasteful and for having too expansive powers to collect data on financial institutions. The second Donald Trump administration has sought to massively cut the OFR's staff and operations.

== History ==
Senator Tim Scott, chair of the banking committee in the Senate, proposed eliminating the OFR in 2025.

On May 15, 2026, the Treasury Department started to restructure the OFR by eliminating up to 63 percent of its staff to focus on deregulation rather than proactive risk monitoring.

== Director ==
The director of the Office of Financial Research is appointed for a six-year term. Under the Trump presidency, the agency became less independent when the director was made subordinate to the secretary of the Treasury. The director, in consultation with the chairman of the FSOC (who is the secretary of the Treasury) proposes the OFR annual budget. The director may set salaries of the office's employees “without regard to chapter 51 or subchapter III of chapter 53 of Title 5 of the United States Code, relating to classification of positions and General Schedule pay rates”.

=== Authority ===
The director has subpoena power and may require from any financial institution (bank or non-bank) any data needed to carry out the functions of the office. However, this power has not been used or tested.

== Responsibilities ==
The Dodd-Frank Act charged the Office of Financial Research with supporting the Financial Stability Oversight Council and member agencies by:

1. Collecting data on behalf of the council, and providing such data to the council and member agencies;
2. Standardizing the types and formats of data reported and collected;
3. Performing applied research and essential long-term research;
4. Developing tools for risk measurement and monitoring;
5. Performing other related services;
6. Making the results of its activities available to financial regulatory agencies; and
7. Assisting FSOC member agencies in determining the types and formats of data authorized by the act to be collected by the member agencies.

== Resources ==
Like the FSOC, the Office of Financial Research may request, from any US department or agency "such services, funds, facilities, staff, and other support services as the Office may determine advisable. Any Federal Government employee may be detailed to the Office without reimbursement, and such detail shall be without interruption or loss of civil service status or privilege." Within the Treasury, there is a revolving fund, the Financial Research Fund into which all appropriations, fees, and assessments that the Office receives are deposited. Surplus funds may be invested. It was envisioned that within two years of its establishment the office would be self-funding.

By fiscal 2016, the bureau had 225 employees and a budget of $99 million from fees paid by banks. In 2018, the OFR went through a substantial reduction in its workforce. President Trump claimed he was saving tax payers' money even though the funding came from fees. At the end of 2018, the OFR had slightly over 100 employees.

== Financial Instrument Reference Database (FIRD) ==
In 2020, the OFR announced a Financial Instrument Reference Database (FIRD). The aim is for users to compare definitions from different industry standards to help identify inconsistencies in financial terms. Five common asset classes are covered: equities, debt, options, warrants, and futures. By 2023, the FIRD used data sources from three international bodies for these five types of assets:

- ISO 20022, the foundational source in December 2020. This included definitions of the terms and conditions of contracts, as well as the instruments themselves.
- the ACTUS Financial Research Foundation’s data dictionary (added in October 2021). There is an ACTUS Data Standard that defines a universal set of legal terms (CT attributes) that are used as parameters in financial agreements, and an Algorithmic Standard that defines the logic embedded in legal agreements that turn contract terms into actual cash flows, or business events. These are regarded as important in the tokenization of financial instruments and the development of smart contracts for decentralized finance (DeFi).
- the Financial Information eXchange (FIX) messaging standard used in financial markets for the electronic communication of indications, orders, and executions (added in November 2022).

The OFR was also working with the X9 Financial Industry Forum on Financial Terms Harmonization to collect comments on the definitions available in the FIRD.

== Workforce development ==
The Office has broad latitude in performing support services for both the Council and other Member Agencies, including data collection, applied research and essential long-term research, and developing tools for monitoring risk. The Office can also issue guidelines to standardizing the way data is reported, constituent agencies have three years to implement data standardization guidelines. In many ways, the Office of Financial Research is to be operated without the constraints of the Civil Service system. For example, it does not need to follow federal pay scale guidelines (see above), and it is mandated that the office have:

- Training and Workforce Development Plan that includes training, leadership development and succession planning
- Workplace Flexibility Plan that includes telework, flexible work schedules, job sharing, parental leave benefits and childcare assistance, domestic partner benefits
- Recruitment and Retention Plan

=== Temporary management reporting ===
For a period of five years after enactment, the Office shall submit an annual report to the Senate Committee on Banking, Housing and Urban Affairs, and the House Committee on Financial Services, what amounts to a management report, including:

- Training And Workforce Development Plan – that includes:
  - Identification of skill and technical expertise needs and action taken to meet the requirements
  - Steps taken to foster innovation and creativity
  - Leadership development and succession Planning
  - Effective use of technology by employees
- Workplace Flexibility Plan – that includes:
  - Telework
  - Flexible work schedules
  - Phased retirement
  - Reemployment annuitants
  - Parental leave benefits and childcare assistance
  - Domestic partner benefits
  - Other workplace flexibilities
- Recruitment and Retention Plan – that includes:
  - The steps necessary to target highly qualified applicant pools with diverse backgrounds
  - Streamlined employment application process
  - Timely notification of employment applications
  - Measures of hiring effectiveness

== Sections ==
=== Data and Research & Analysis Centers ===
The Office is supported by two entities:

- The Data Center, which collects, validates and maintains (and publishes some of) the data required to support the council; which may be obtained from commercial data providers, publicly available data sources and the financial entities supervised by state and federal agencies; and
- The Research and Analysis Center, which conducts independent analysis of available information to identify financially destabilizing effects, and develops and maintains independent analytical capabilities and computing resources to:
  - Develop and maintain metrics and reporting systems for risks to the financial stability of the United States
  - Monitor, investigate, and report on changes in systemwide risk levels and patterns to the Council and Congress
  - Conduct, coordinate, and sponsor research to support and improve regulation of financial entities and markets
  - Evaluate and report on stress tests or other stability-related evaluations of financial entities overseen by the member agencies
  - Maintain expertise in such areas as may be necessary to support specific requests for advice and assistance from financial regulators
  - Investigate disruptions and failures in the financial markets, report findings, and make recommendations to the Council based on those findings;
  - Conduct studies and provide advice on the impact of policies related to systemic risk; and
  - Promote best practices for financial risk management.

== Reporting ==
The Director reports to and testifies before only the Senate Committee on Banking, Housing, and Urban Affairs and the House Committee on Financial Services of the House of Representatives. Testimony shall be annual on the activities of the Office, including the work of the Data Center and the Research and Analysis Center and the assessment of significant financial and market developments and potential emerging threats to the financial stability of the Country. These reports to Congress are independent of any political influence in that "No officer or agency of the United States shall have any authority to require the Director to submit the testimony ... for approval, comment, or review prior to the submission of such testimony."

== List of directors of the Office of Financial Research ==
No.	Name	Took office	Left office
1	Richard Berner	January 2, 2013	December 31, 2017
2	Dino Falaschetti	June 27, 2019	February 28, 2022
-	James Martin (acting)	February 28, 2022	

== See also ==
- 2008 financial crisis
- Regulatory responses to the subprime crisis
- Subprime mortgage crisis solutions debate
- Wall Street reform
- Title 12 of the Code of Federal Regulations
- Macroprudential regulation
- Systemic Risk Council
- Volcker Rule
