= Wayne A. Abernathy =

American economist

Wayne A. Abernathy is a United States economist and congressional staffer who served as Assistant Secretary of the Treasury for Financial Institutions from 2002 to 2005.

== Biography ==
Wayne A. Abernathy was educated at the Johns Hopkins University, receiving a bachelor's degree in International Studies in 1978, and a master's degree in International Studies in 1980.

From 1981 to 1986, Abernathy worked as an economist with the United States Senate Committee on Banking, Housing, and Urban Affairs's Subcommittee on International Finance & Monetary Policy. From 1987 to 1989, he was a senior legislative assistant of Sen. Phil Gramm (R–Tex.). He was economist for the Senate Committee on Banking, Housing, and Urban Affairs from 1989 to 1994. From 1995 to 1998, he was the Staff Director of the Committee's Subcommittee on Securities. He then served as the full Committee's Staff Director from 1999 to 2002.

In 2002, President of the United States George W. Bush nominated Abernathy to be Assistant Secretary of the Treasury for Financial Institutions and Abernathy subsequently held this office until 2005.

Upon leaving government service in 2005, Abernathy joined the American Bankers Association as Executive Vice President for Financial Institutions Policy and Regulatory Affairs.

Government offices
Preceded by Sheila Bair	Assistant Secretary of the Treasury for Financial Institutions; 2003 — 2005	Succeeded by Emil Henry
