= Richard J. Herring =

American economist

Richard J. Herring is an American economist, currently the Jacob Safra Professor of International Banking at Wharton School of the University of Pennsylvania.

== Bibliography ==
- Richard J. Herring; Robert E. Litan (December 1, 1994). Financial Regulation in the Global Economy. Brookings Institution Press. ISBN 978-0-8157-9155-3. OCLC 246575489.
- Wharton School; Global Interdependence Center; Group of Thirty (April 30, 1986). Managing Foreign Exchange Risk: Essays Commissioned in Honor of the Centenary of the Wharton School, University of Pennsylvania. Cambridge University Press. ISBN 978-0-521-31120-5.
