= Assistant Secretary of the Treasury for Financial Institutions =

Official in the U.S. Treasury Department

- Flag of an assistant secretary of the treasury
- Incumbent; Luke Pettit since July 28, 2025
- Department of the Treasury
- Style: The Honorable
- Reports to: Under Secretary of the Treasury for Domestic Finance
- Nominator: President of the United States
- Formation: 1976
- First holder: Robert A. Gerard
- Salary: $155,500 (2010)
- Website: Official website

The assistant secretary of the treasury for financial institutions is an official in the United States Department of the Treasury who is the head of the Office of Financial Institutions (OFI). The office "helps formulate policy on financial institutions and government-sponsored enterprises, cybersecurity and critical infrastructure protection."

The post is currently held by Luke Pettit, who was nominated to the position by President Donald Trump on February 11, 2025.

== History ==
The office was formed in 1976 by Secretary of the Treasury William E. Simon as the Assistant Secretary for Capital Markets and Debt Management.

According to U.S. statute, there are ten assistant secretaries of the treasury appointed by the president of the United States with the advice and consent of the United States Senate. The assistant secretary of the treasury for financial institutions reports to the under secretary of the treasury for domestic finance, who in turn reports to the secretary of the treasury and the deputy secretary of the treasury.

== List of assistant secretaries of the treasury for financial institutions ==
Name	Assumed office	Left office	President appointed by	Secretary served under
Robert A. Gerard	1976	1977	Gerald Ford	William E. Simon
Roger C. Altman	June 13, 1977	1981	Jimmy Carter	
Roger William Mehle, Jr.	1981	1983	Ronald Reagan	
Thomas J. Healey	1983	1985	Ronald Reagan	
Charles O. Sethness	1985	1989	Ronald Reagan	
David W. Mullins, Jr.	1989	1990	George H. W. Bush	
Jerome H. Powell	1990	April 7, 1992	George H. W. Bush	
John Cunningham Dugan	1992	1993	George H. W. Bush	
Richard S. Carnell	1993	1999	Bill Clinton	Lloyd Bentsen, Robert Rubin
Gregory Baer	1999	January 20, 2001	Bill Clinton	Robert Rubin, Larry Summers
Sheila Bair	July 2001	June 2002	George W. Bush	Paul O'Neill
Wayne A. Abernathy	2003	2005	George W. Bush	John W. Snow
Emil Henry	2005	2007	George W. Bush	John W. Snow, Henry Paulson
David Nason	March 2007	March 2009	George W. Bush	Henry Paulson
Michael Barr	May 2009	January 2011	Barack Obama	Timothy Geithner
Cyrus Amir-Mokri	November 1, 2011	November 1, 2014	Barack Obama	Timothy Geithner
Christopher Campbell	September 25, 2017	July 31, 2018	Donald Trump	Steven Mnuchin
Bimal Patel	June 27, 2019	July 1, 2020	Donald Trump	Steven Mnuchin
Graham Steele	December 3, 2021	January 19, 2024	Joe Biden	Janet Yellen
Laurie Schaffer (acting)	January 19, 2024	January 20, 2025	Joe Biden	Janet Yellen
Steven Seitz (acting)	January 20, 2025	July 28, 2025	Donald Trump	Scott Bessent
Luke Pettit	July 28, 2025	Present	Donald Trump	Scott Bessent

== See also ==
- Assistant Secretary of the Treasury
