= Bimal Patel (attorney) =

American attorney

Bimal V. Patel
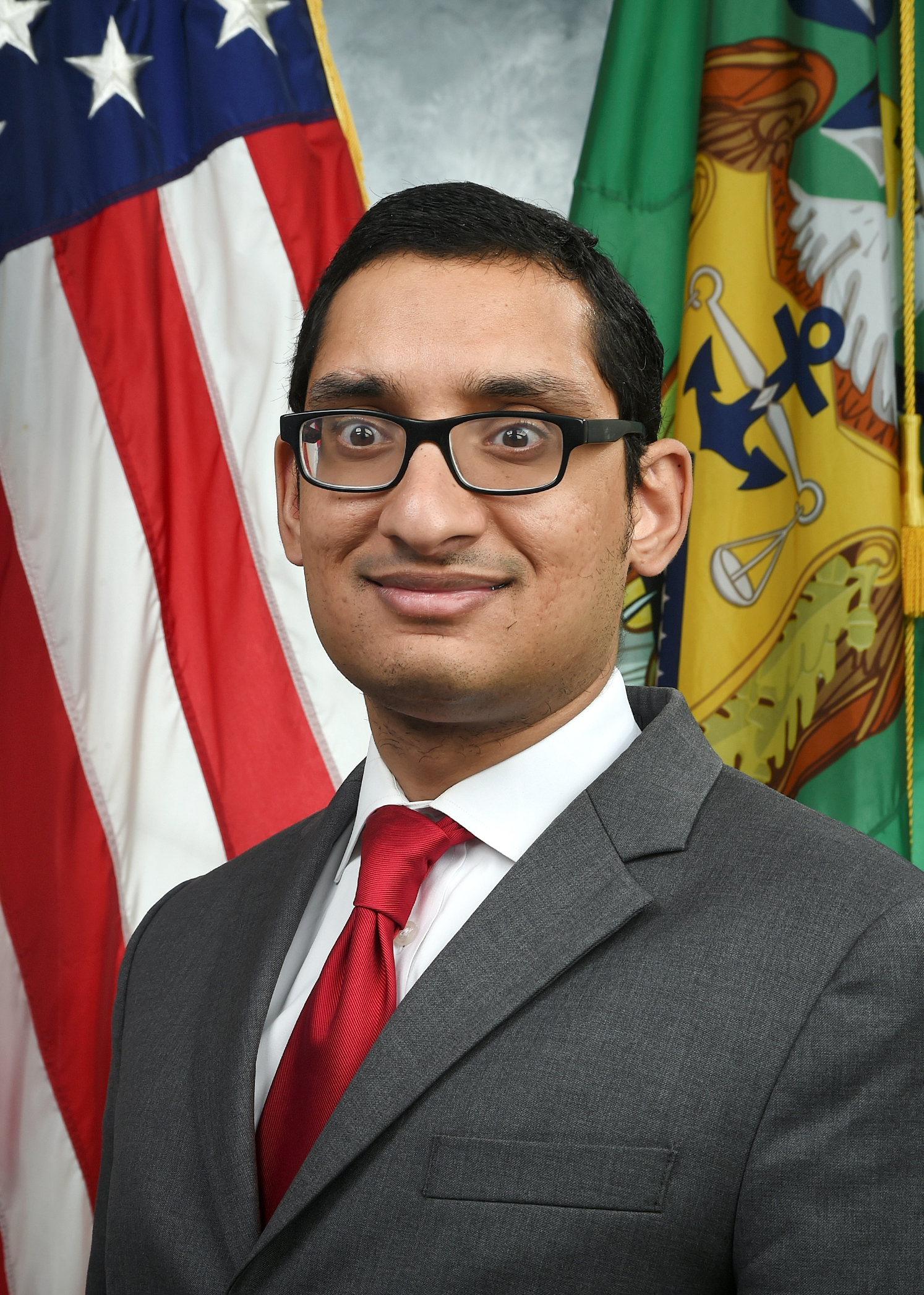

Assistant Secretary of the Treasury for Financial Institutions
- In office June 27, 2019 – July 1, 2020
- President: Donald Trump
- Preceded by: Christopher Campbell
- Succeeded by: Graham Steele

Personal details
- Education: Stanford University (BA); Georgetown University (JD); Harvard University (MPP)

Bimal V. Patel is an American attorney who served as the Assistant Secretary of the Treasury for Financial Institutions and Deputy Assistant Secretary of the Treasury for the Financial Stability Oversight Council. He was one of the “architects” of the emergency $660 billion Paycheck Protection Program in 2020. He joined PayPal as the company's General Counsel following his departure from the Treasury Department.

== Early life and education ==
Patel, the son of Indian immigrants, was raised in Georgia. His father was a peanut farmer in India before immigrating to the United States, where he ran small businesses and taught at Spelman College.

Patel overcame significant health complications and challenges following a three-month premature birth, after which he contracted pneumonia at two weeks old. Doctors predicted that he would not survive, would not grow taller than four feet, and would be permanently incapacitated.

Patel earned his undergraduate degree in economics and political science from Stanford University, a J.D. from Georgetown University Law Center, and an M.P.P. from Kennedy School of Government at Harvard University in 2008.

== Career ==
=== PayPal ===
Patel currently serves as the Senior Vice President and General Counsel of PayPal Holdings, Inc. Patel joined PayPal in January 2021 and assumed the role of General Counsel on January 1, 2022. In this role, he is the company’s senior-most legal officer and oversees the legal function across over its 200 global markets.

=== U.S. Department of the Treasury ===
Patel joined the United States Department of the Treasury in May 2017 as Deputy Assistant Secretary for the Financial Stability Oversight Council ("FSOC"), during which he was a member of leadership responsible for monitoring risks in the U.S. financial system.

On September 13, 2018, President Donald J. Trump nominated Patel to be the Assistant Secretary of the Treasury for Financial Institutions. After being confirmed by Senate voice vote with no objections, he was sworn into the position on June 20, 2019. As Assistant Secretary for Financial Institutions, he oversaw the Office of Financial Institutions Policy, the Federal Insurance Office, the Office of Cybersecurity and Critical Infrastructure Protection, and the Office of Economic and Community Development. During his tenure, Patel worked with the Federal Reserve on its Treasury-financed programs and forwarded the Treasury's initiatives concerning the banking system. Upon being confirmed, Patel was the most senior Indian-American ever to serve at Treasury.

Patel co-led the Treasury Department's work to implement the Paycheck Protection Program (PPP), a $660 billion small business loan program established under The Coronavirus Aid, Relief, and Economic Security Act (CARES Act). He was the chief liaison between the Treasury Department and thousands of banks and credit unions making loans in the program. The program ultimately led to nearly $800 billion in loans to businesses.

=== O'Melveny & Myers LLP and Federal Deposit Insurance Corporation ===
Patel was a partner and head of the Financial Advisory and Regulation Practice at the law firm O'Melveny & Myers, and an adjunct associate professor at Stanford University where he taught banking regulation. Patel had previously served as Senior Advisor to Jeremiah Norton, a staff position advising him as a member of the Board of Directors of the Federal Deposit Insurance Corporation.
