= Office of Financial Institutions =

The Office of Financial Institutions (OFI) is an agency of the United States federal government in the United States Department of the Treasury. OFI coordinates the department's efforts regarding financial institutions legislation and regulation, legislation affecting Federal agencies that regulate or insure financial institutions, and securities markets legislation and regulation. The office coordinates the department's efforts on financial education policy and ensuring the resiliency of the financial services sector in the wake of a terrorist attack.

The office was formed in 1976 by Secretary of the Treasury William E. Simon as the Office of Capital Markets and Debt Management.

The Office of Financial Institutions is led by the Assistant Secretary of the Treasury for Financial Institutions, who reports to the United States Secretary of the Treasury through the Under Secretary of the Treasury for Domestic Finance. Within the Office of Financial Institutions are:

- The Office of Financial Institutions Policy
- The Office of Financial Education
- The Office of Critical Infrastructure Protection and Compliance Policy

== Office of Financial Institutions Policy ==
The Office of Financial Institutions Policy (OFIP) develops, analyzes, and coordinates the Department of the Treasury’s policies on legislative and regulatory issues affecting financial institutions, including depository institutions, insurance companies, government sponsored enterprises, securities firms, finance companies, mutual funds, and all other regulated and unregulated financial intermediaries. The office’s principal focus is on issues dealing with safety and soundness, market structure, condition, and competitiveness, and regulatory structure. The Office of Financial Institutions Policy is led by the Deputy Assistant Secretary for Financial Institutions Policy.

Within the Office of Financial Institutions Policy are:

- The Terrorism Risk Insurance Program (TRIP), led by the Executive Director of the Terrorism Risk Insurance Program. The TRIP is a system of shared public and private compensation for insured losses resulting from acts of terrorism.
- The Community Development Financial Institutions Fund (CDFI Fund), led by the Director of the Community Development Financial Institutions Fund. The CDFI Fund is responsible for expanding the capacity of financial institutions to provide credit, capital, and financial services to under-served populations and communities in the United States.

== Office of Financial Education ==
The Office of Financial Education (OFE) is responsible for focusing the department's financial education policymaking, and for ensuring coordination on financial education within the department and all of its bureaus. The Office of Financial Education serves to provide the Department of the Treasury with expertise on the many complex and interdisciplinary issues involved in financial education, and is able to tap into the department's wide base of expertise on finance.

The Office of Financial Education is led by the Deputy Assistant Secretary for Financial Education.

- The Office of Financial Education, led by the Director of the Office of Financial Education

The office is responsible for developing and implementing financial education policy and programs, including the Sherman Award for Excellence in Financial Education, the Technical Assistance Center, the e-newsletter and outreach program.

- The Office of Outreach, led by the Director of Outreach

The office is responsible for developing and coordinating outreach strategies to communities and media outlets in support of the Office’s mission. The office serves as a liaison to the Financial Literacy and Education Commission and manages the activities of the Commission such as the implementation of the National Strategy.

- The Community Adjustment and Investment Program (CAIP), led by the Director of the Community Adjustment and Investment Program (CAIP)

CAIP is responsible for providing capital to US businesses in communities adversely affected by the North American Free Trade Agreement. In addition, CAIP is responsible for the administration of the First Accounts program and provides support to the Office of Financial Education.

== Office of Critical Infrastructure Protection and Compliance Policy ==
The Office of Critical Infrastructure Protection and Compliance Policy coordinates the department's development and implementation of policies regarding: the protection of the critical infrastructure of the financial services sector, including the department's lead agency role with respect to the financial sector; the development of statutes and regulations within the financial sector, including money laundering, internet gambling and identity theft; and the sharing of information among financial institutions and between the private and public sectors, including financial privacy and the sharing of suspicious information pursuant to the Bank Secrecy Act. The office staffs the Financial and Banking Information Infrastructure Committee.
