= Leon Loeb =

American businessman

- Born: 13 June 1845; Strasbourg, Alsace, France
- Died: 22 Jul 1911 (aged 66); Los Angeles, California
- Spouse: Estelle Newmark
- Children: 4 including Joseph P. Loeb
- Family: Harris Newmark (father-in-law); Marc Eugene Meyer (cousin)

Leon Loeb (1845–1911) was a French-born American businessman who owned and operated the first department store in Los Angeles. He was a member of the Newmark family through marriage.

== Biography ==
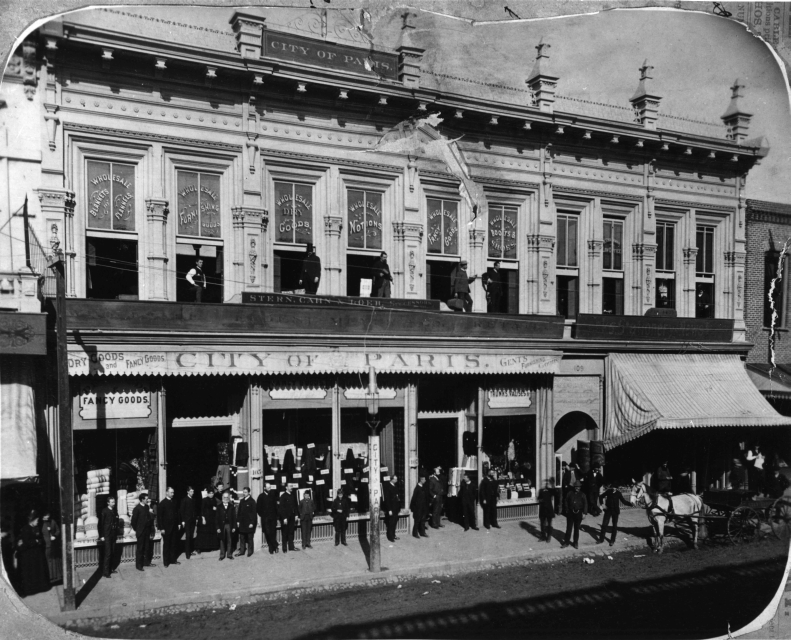
Stern, Cahn & Loeb's City of Paris department store at 105-7 N. Spring St. (post-1890 numbering: 205-7 Spring), sometime between 1883-1890

Leon (Leopold) Loeb, was born to a Jewish family in Strasbourg, Alsace, France, the son of Rosalie (née Levi) and Jacob Loeb. He worked as a bookkeeper in Switzerland before immigrating to Los Angeles in September 1864. He was able to secure a job at S. Lazard & Company (founded by Solomon Lazard and Maurice Kremer) where his cousin Marc Eugene Meyer worked. On 3 March 1874, Solomon Lazard retired and Marc Eugene Mayer, his brother Constant Meyer, and Nathan Kahn (Cahn) purchased S. Lazard & Co. renaming it Eugene Meyer & Company. At Loeb's urging, they promoted the firm as "The City of Paris" (not to be confused with the similarly named store in San Francisco), the city's first department store. The store would grow to be the largest and most elaborate department store in the Southwest. On 31 January 1879, Loeb purchased the interest held by Constant Meyer and the firm was renamed Meyer, Kahn and Loeb. In October 1883, Eugene Meyer sold his interest and moved to San Francisco to work for Lazard Frères. After the admission of to Emmanuel L. Stern as a partner, the company was renamed Stern, Cahn & Loeb. After the departure of Nathan Cahn, it was renamed Stern, Loeb & Company until its liquidation in the early 1890s.

Meyer had also been the French Consular Agent in Los Angeles, and he recommended Leopold Loeb to take as consul, which he did in 1883. Leopold Loeb served as the French Consular Agent for over fifteen years. The French government awarded him the Officer of the Academy (Officier d'académie).

== Personal life ==
In 1879, he married Estelle Newmark, the daughter of Harris Newmark and granddaughter of Joseph Newmark. They had three children who survived to adulthood: Rose Newmark Levi (b. 1881) married to Herman Levi, Joseph P. Loeb (b. 1883), and Edwin J. Loeb (1886). A fourth child, George, died after several months. Loeb died in 1911.
