= Doria Deighton-Jones =

American property developer

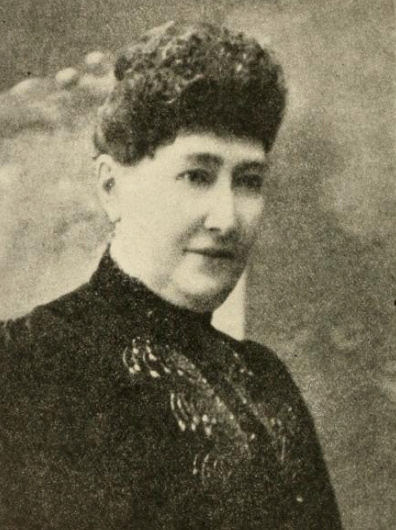
- Born: Doria Deighton; June 6, 1824; Perth, Scotland
- Died: March 24, 1908 (aged 83); Los Angeles, California
- Known for: The Historic Doria Apartments
- Spouse: John Jones (m. 1858; died 1876)
- Children: 3

Doria Deighton-Jones (June 6, 1824 – March 24, 1908) was a Scottish-born American landowner and property developer in Los Angeles who built a "vast estate in and around" the city while the city was in its infancy.

== Personal life ==
Deighton-Jones was born Doria Deighton in Perth, Scotland on June 6, 1824. She came to Los Angeles in 1855 from San Francisco, marrying John Jones in 1858. Some historians posit that Mrs. Jones converted to Judaism prior to her marriage to Jones while others maintain that she never ever converted. In Los Angeles the couple lived in a "large adobe home" adjoining the present site of Olvera Street in the Los Angeles Plaza Historic District. They had three children, including son Mark Gordon and daughters Constance (Simpson) and Caroline A. (Mrs. James B. Lankershim). Doria Deighton-Jones died on 24 March 1908 at the age of 84, in her home at 955 South Hill Street. At the time of her death, "She is said to have been the oldest 'white woman' resident of the city."

== Business ==
Doria Deighton-Jones became a property developer after her husband's death. She was known as the "owner of a vast estate in and around Los Angeles" valued at a million dollars, at the time of her death in 1908.

Doria Deighton-Jones was an organizer of the Ladies' Hebrew Benevolent Society of Los Angeles in 1870, the city's first philanthropic organization, and served as its treasurer.

=== Jones Block ===
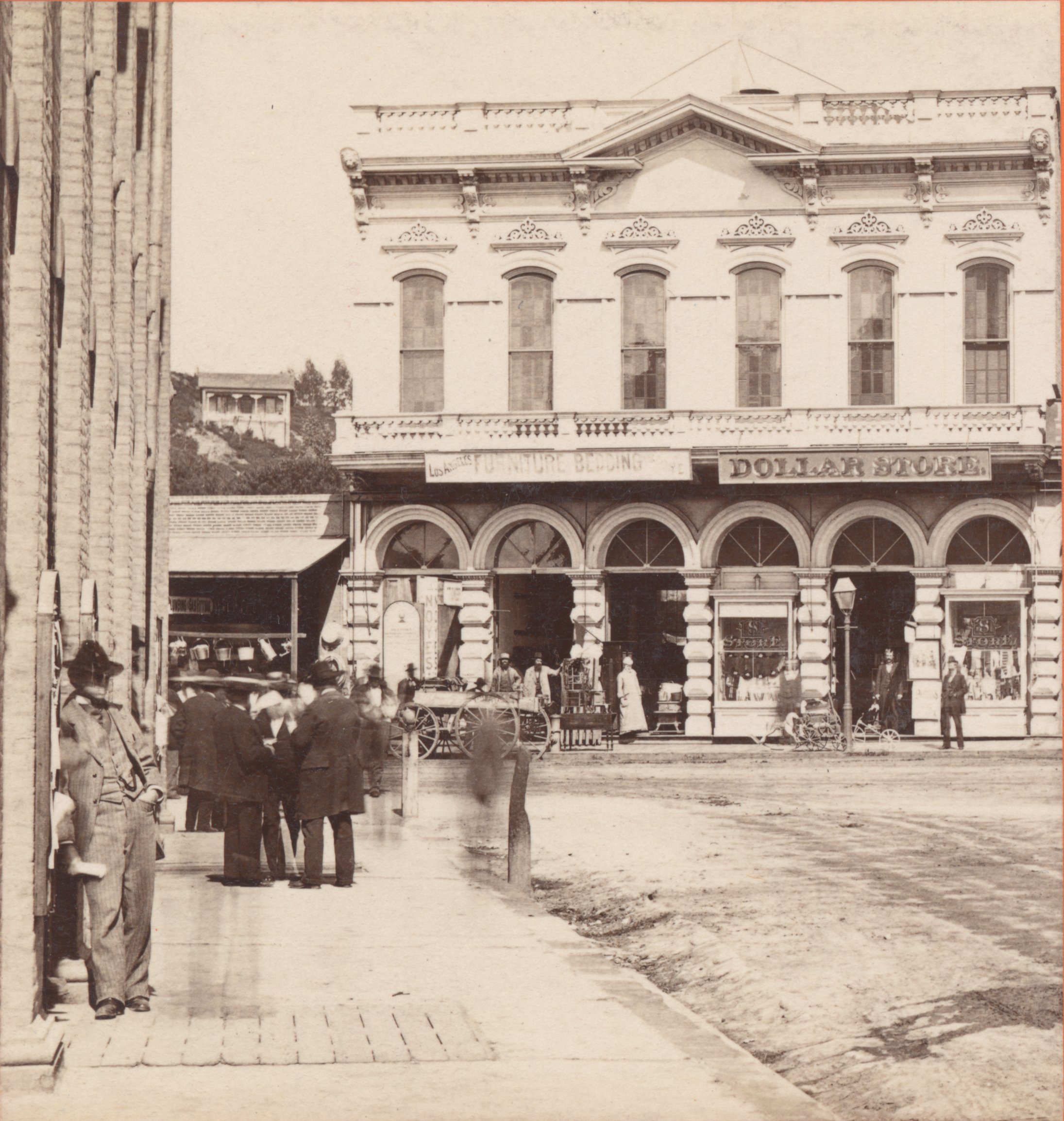
Jones Block south building c.1884

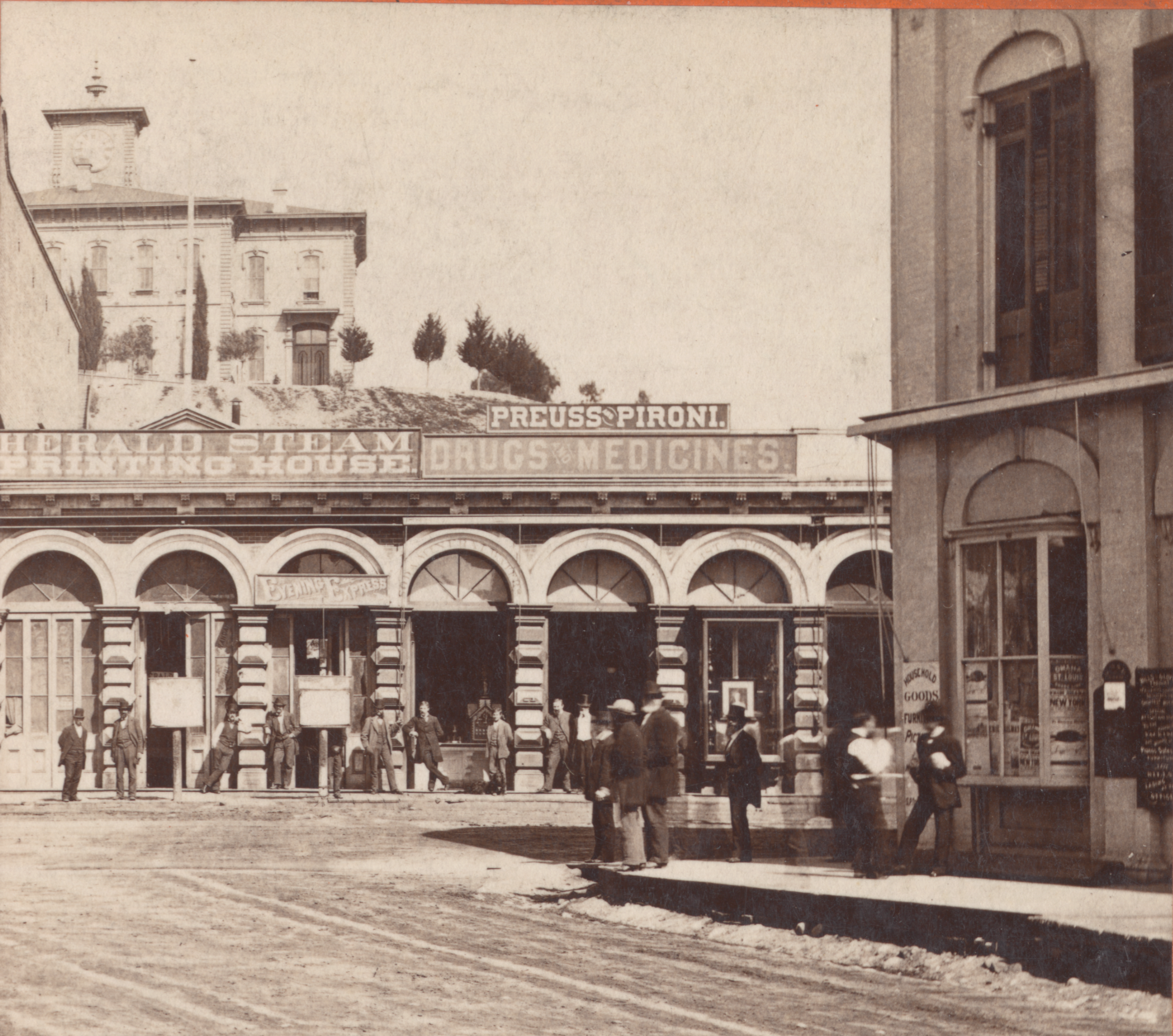
Jones Block north building c.1884; Los Angeles High School behind it.

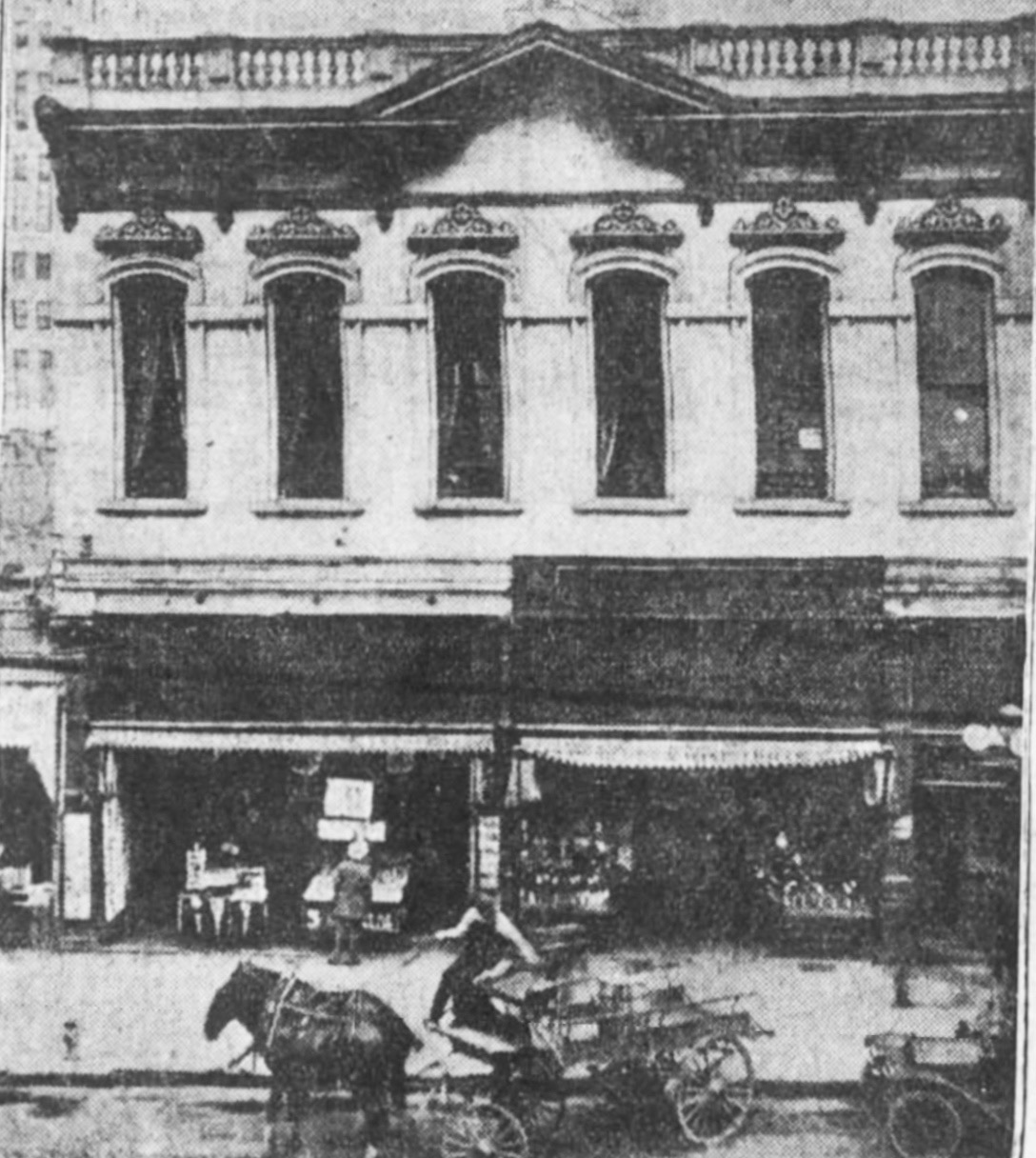
J. W. Robinson's store at Jones Block c.1886–95

In 1882 Jones commissioned the Jones Block at 171–201 N. Spring Street, the center of the city's upscale retail district in the decade following. It was home to J. W. Robinson's Boston Dry Goods from 1886 to 1895 and the City of Paris department store c.1895–1897.

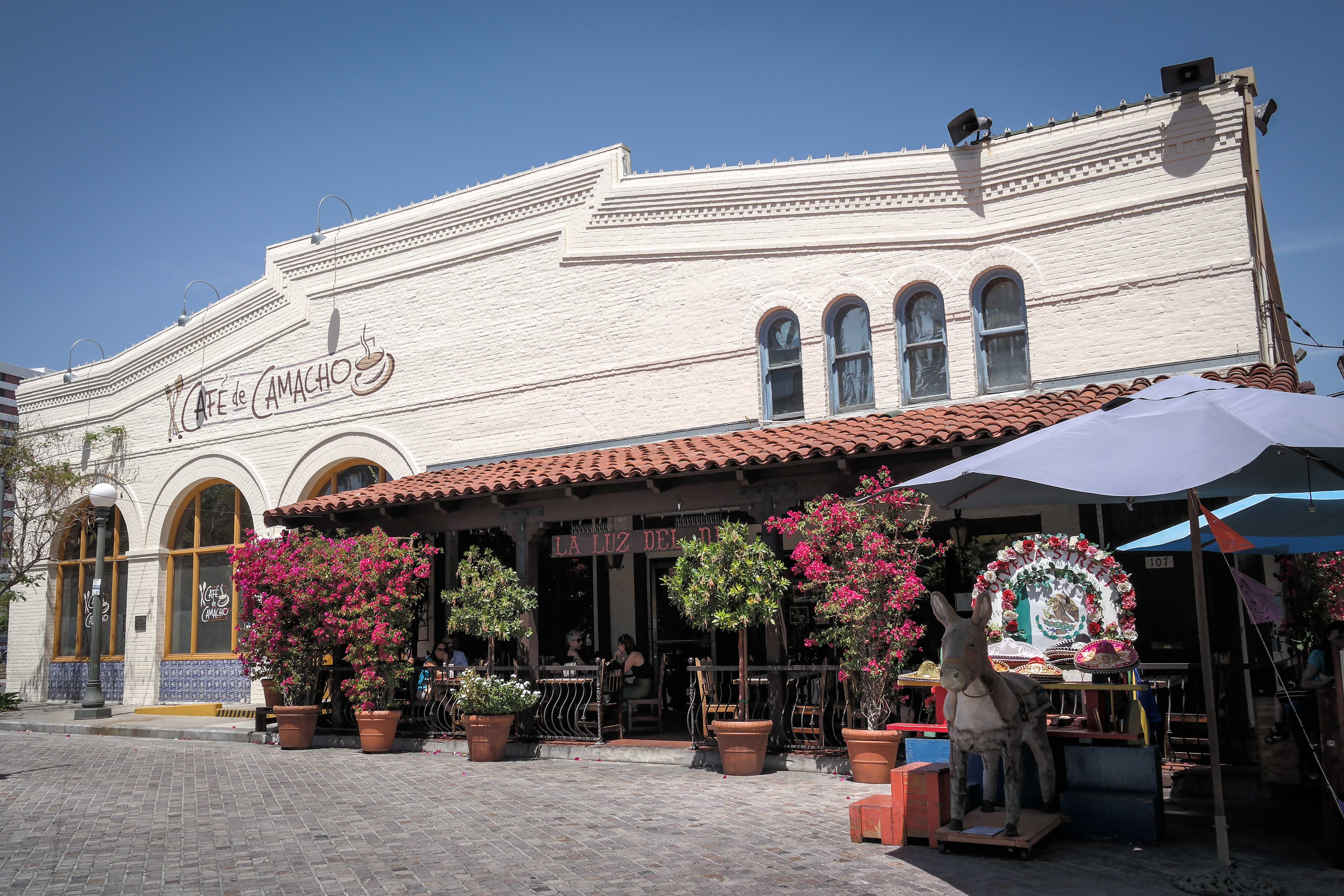
Simpson-Jones Building, Olvera Street

=== Olvera Street ===
Doria Deighton-Jones built the Simpson-Jones Building in 1894 at the #1 Olvera Street site of the family's 1840s adobe house on the Plaza, which had been torn down in 1886 when Bath Street was widened to make an extension of Main Street. It was constructed to house William Gregory Engines, also known as Moline Engines. Later tenants were the Diamond Shirt Company and the Soochow Restaurant. To its north is the Machine Shop building, built in 1886 on the site of the adobe's stables. After Olvera Street became a Mexican Alta California era-themed shopping area in 1930, the shop's main entryway was switched from the Main to the Olvera facade, and is the present day entrance of El Luz del Día restaurant. Its facade was remodeled in 1960 to resemble a mid-19th century Mexican bank. The name honors the Jones' daughter, Constance Jones Simpson. She inherited the property in 1908.

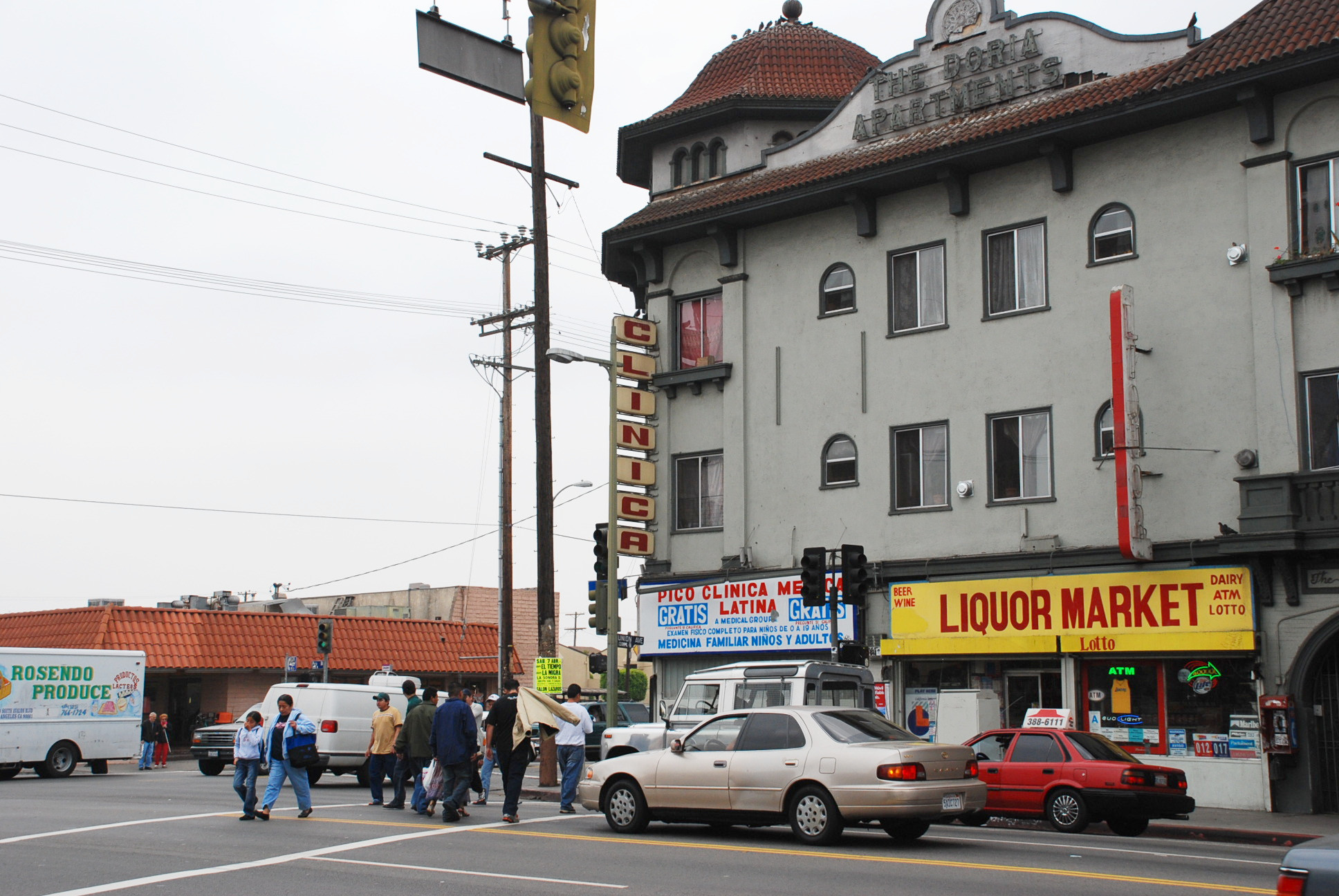
The Historic Doria Apartments on Pico Blvd.

=== Alvarado Terrace ===
In 1902 Doria Jones subdivided her property in the Alvarado Terrace neighborhood of the Pico-Union district in Central Los Angeles. The lots were sold for only $10 each, but required the buyers to build houses that cost at least $4,000. It was publicized as "The only exclusive Residential Tract in the city. . . No flats, cottages or stores." It is the present day Alvarado Terrace Historic District, on the National Register of Historic Places.

=== Doria Apartments ===
Around 1905 the Doria Apartments building was built by Doria Jones at 1600-1604 West Pico Boulevard. It was designed in the Mission Revival style by Gotfred Hanson. It is a registered Los Angeles Historic-Cultural Monument.
