= Marc Eugene Meyer =

American businessman (1842–1925)

- Born: January 27, 1842; Strasbourg, France
- Died: January 17, 1925 (age 83)
- Occupation: Businessman
- Known for: President of Lazard Frères
- Spouse: Harriet Newmark
- Children: 8, including Eugene Isaac Meyer, Florence Meyer Blumenthal, Aline Meyer Liebman
- Family: Joseph Newmark (father-in-law); Myer J. Newmark (brother-in-law); Agnes Ernst (daughter-in-law); George Blumenthal (son-in-law); Luis Martins de Souza Dantas (son-in-law); Leon Loeb (cousin)

Marc Eugene Meyer (January 27, 1842 – January 17, 1925) was an American businessman and was president of Lazard Frères in the United States. Born in Strasbourg, France, he migrated to California as a teenager, living in San Francisco and Los Angeles until 1893 when he moved to New York City in his role with Lazard. He was awarded the Legion of Honor in 1920.

== Early life ==
Meyer was born to a Jewish family, the son of Sephora (née Loeb) and Isaac Meyer, in Strasbourg, France. His father was a rabbi and was a member of Strasbourg's civilian government; his grandfather Jacob, also a rabbi, was appointed by Napoleon I to the Congress of Jewish Notables to help delineate the legal status of French Jews. His brother-in-law, Zadoc Kahn, was the Grand Rabbi of France.

== Career ==
After his father's death in 1859, 17-year-old Meyer left Strasbourg and emigrated to California. French financier Alexandre Lazard of Lazard Frères recommended him to his cousin Alexandre Weill, (then Lazard's representative in San Francisco), securing Meyer work as a stock boy under Simon Lazard. (The Lazards, Weills, Kahns, and Meyers, all French Jews, had frequently intermarried.) In 1860, he was hired as a bookkeeper at the Los Angeles store of Solomon Lazard (Simon Lazard's cousin) and Maurice Kremer on Bell's Row. In 1864, he secured a job at the firm for his cousin Leon Loeb. In 1874, Meyer bought out Lazard's interest in the store (Kremer had previously sold his interest to Lazard), partnering with his brother, Constant Meyer, and Nathan Kahn (Cahn) renaming it Eugene Meyer & Company. He rebranded it as The City of Paris (not to be confused with the similarly named store in San Francisco) which would grow to be the largest and most elaborate department store in the Southwest. In 1884, he sold the store and moved to San Francisco, where he replaced Alexandre Weill as president of Lazard Frères, which was then one of the three "Houses of Lazard" (the other two being the Lazard operations in France and England). After the Panic of 1893 (partly brought about by the passing of the Sherman Silver Purchase Act of 1890), Meyer was reassigned to New York City to oversee Lazard's investments, and was seminal in persuading J.P. Morgan and many European investors not to liquidate their holdings. The act was soon repealed and the crisis resolved.

Meyer retired in 1901. On January 27, 1920—Meyer's 78th birthday—the French government made him an Officer of the Legion of Honor.

== Personal life and death ==
In 1867, he married Harriet Newmark, daughter of rabbi Joseph Newmark (Harriet's sister Caroline had married Solomon Lazard) and sister of Myer J. Newmark; they had five daughters and three sons. His son, Eugene Isaac Meyer, married Agnes Ernst. His daughter, Rosalie, married Sigmund Stern, the nephew of Levi Strauss and son of David Stern; and his daughter, Elise, married Sigmund's brother Abraham Stern. (Elise was later widowed and remarried Brazilian ambassador Luis Martins de Souza Dantas in 1933 who saved more than 400 people helping to escape Nazi persecution). His daughter, Florence Meyer Blumenthal, married George Blumenthal. His son, Edgar Joseph Meyer (married to Leila Saks, the daughter of Andrew Saks), perished in the sinking of the RMS Titanic. His daughter Aline Meyer, married Charles Joseph Liebmann, the son of brewer Henry Liebmann and grandson of Samuel Liebmann. His granddaughters were Katharine Graham and Florence Meyer (daughters of his son Eugene Isaac). His great-grandson was Walter A. Haas Jr. (grandson of his daughter Rosalie), who served as president of Levi Strauss & Co.

Meyer died on January 17, 1925, at his home at 135 Central Park West, Manhattan.
