= Joseph Newmark =

Prussian-American businessman (1799–1881)

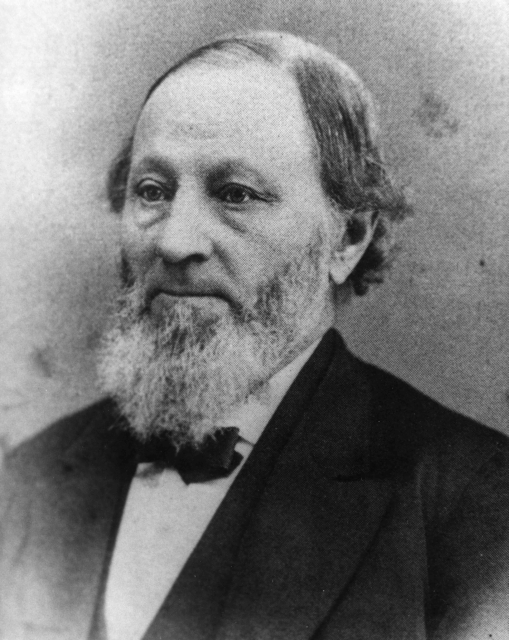
- Born: 1799; Neumark, West Prussia (now Poland)
- Died: 1881 (aged 81–82); Los Angeles, California, U.S.
- Spouse: Rosa Levy Newmark
- Children: Matilda Newmark Kremer; Myer J. Newmark; Sarah Newmark; Caroline Newmark Lazard; Edward Newmark; Harriet Newmark Meyer
- Relatives: Joseph P. Newmark (nephew); Harris Newmark (nephew and son-in-law); Maurice Kremer (son-in-law); Solomon Lazard (son-in-law); Marc Eugene Meyer (son-in-law); Eugene Isaac Meyer (grandson); Florence Meyer Blumenthal (granddaughter); Katharine Graham (great-granddaughter); Florence Meyer Homolka (great-granddaughter); Lally Weymouth (great great-granddaughter); Donald E. Graham (great great-grandson)

Joseph Newmark (1799–1881) was a Prussian-American businessman in New York City and Los Angeles and a member of the Newmark family of Southern California. He helped found Jewish congregations in both cities and later became an ordained rabbi.

After emigrating from Prussia to New York City, he was a co-founder there of B'nai Jeshurun. He moved to the West Coast, briefly living and working in San Francisco.

Newmark moved again to Los Angeles in 1854, where two nephews were already in business. He founded Congregation B'nai B'rith in 1862, which was originally an Orthodox synagogue. It later became Reform and is known as the Wilshire Boulevard Temple, the oldest synagogue in Los Angeles.

== Early life ==
Joseph Newmark was born into a Jewish family in 1799 in Neumark, West Prussia. He received a classical Jewish education, including rabbinical training and certification as a schochet, a ritual slaughterer for kosher meat.

He married for the first time at age 19, and had two children with his first wife. After his wife died at a young age, he and his two children immigrated in 1820 to the United States.

== Career ==
Newmark settled with his children in New York City in 1823. Two years later, in 1825, he was a co-founder of B'nai Jeshurun, a synagogue in Manhattan. He married again there in 1835, to Rose Levy. They had six children together (see below).

He and his growing family moved to St. Louis, Missouri, in 1840. He served as the president of a synagogue until 1845.

He moved to San Francisco in 1852, where he briefly partnered with Joseph Brandenstein and established a dry goods store. He moved to Los Angeles in September 1854, joining his nephews Joseph P. Newmark and Harris Newmark in business for a time. Harris lived with his family, and his wife taught the young man to read and write English. Harris married his daughter Sarah.

Newmark also established Congregation B'nai B'rith in 1862, the oldest synagogue in Los Angeles. It is now known as the Wilshire Boulevard Temple. It was originally an Orthodox synagogue.

Newmark is credited with having performed the first Jewish wedding in California, and officiated as rabbi for his daughters' weddings. In 1862, he persuaded rabbi Abram Wolf Edelman to move to Los Angeles and become its first rabbi. After Newmark's death, the synagogue congregation became Reform. Edelman retired after they made that decision.

Later in life, Newmark became an ordained rabbi in his own right.

== Personal life ==
In 1835 the widower Newmark married Rosa Levy in New York City. They had six children together: Matilda Newmark Kremer (married to Maurice Kremer), Myer J. Newmark, Sarah Newmark (who married her cousin Harris Newmark), Caroline Newmark Lazard (married to Solomon Lazard), Edward Newmark, and Harriet Newmark Meyer (married to Marc Eugene Meyer). Harris's older brother, Joseph P. Newmark, had settled in Los Angeles before him and they were in business together for a time.

== Death ==
Newmark died in 1881 in Los Angeles.
