= Maurice Harris Newmark =

American grocer and writer (1859–1929)

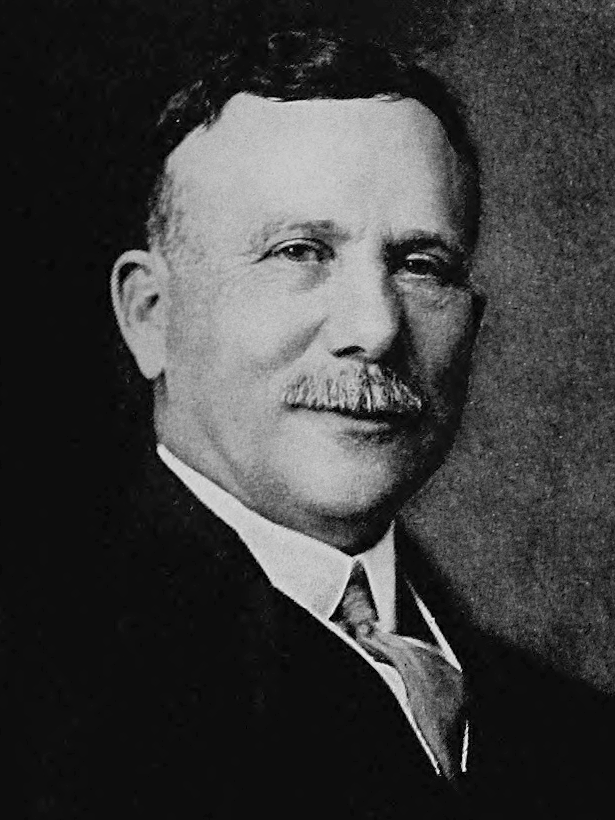
Maurice Harris Newmark

Maurice Harris Newmark (March 3, 1859 – 1929) was a US grocer and writer from Los Angeles, California.

== Early years ==
Newmark was born in Los Angeles on March 3, 1859. He was the son of Harris Newmark, pioneer merchant of Los Angeles and founder of a number of the city's enterprises. His mother was Sarah Newmark. He attended private and public schools in Los Angeles from 1865 till 1872, when he went to New York City and there attended a private school for one year. He studied in Paris, France, from 1873 to 1876, and after graduating, returned to Los Angeles.

== Career ==
Upon his return from France, Newmark went to work for the H. Newmark Company. It was established by his father in 1865, and continued under its original name of H. Newmark and Company and under the sole control of its founder until 1885. Up to 1885, the father had associated with Newmark as partners. Other contemporaries included Kaspare Cohn, Samuel Cohn, M. J. Newmark, and M. A. Newmark. With the father's retirement in 1885, the name was changed to M. A. Newmark and Company, and Newmark became a full partner. In business, he served as vice president, Harris Newmark Co.; first vice president, M. A. Newmark & Company; vice president, Los Angeles Brick Company; director, Equitable Savings Bank; director, Standard Woodenware Company; and director, Montebello Land and Water Company.

Newmark was also identified with several civic and commercial organizations in Los Angeles. He served as the harbor commissioner of Los Angeles under appointment by Mayor Alexander, was president of the Associated Jobbers, as well as president of the Southern California Wholesale Grocers' Association. He was a director of the Chamber of Commerce, the Merchants and Manufacturers' Association, and the Board of Trade. He was also a director of the Southwest Museum, as well as an adjunct of the Archaeological Society of America. Newmark was a thirty-second degree Mason and a Shriner.

== Selected works ==
- Sixty Years in Southern California, 1853-1913: containing the reminiscences of H. Newmark. Edited by Maurice H. Newmark, Marco R. Newmark. With 150 illustrations (1916)

== Bibliography ==
- Guinn, James Miller (1915). A History of California and an Extended History of Los Angeles and Environs: Also Containing Biographies of Well-known Citizens of the Past and Present (Public domain ed.). Historic Record Company. p. 165.
- Los Angeles Examiner (1912). Notables of the Southwest, being the portraits and biographies of progressive men of the Southwest, who have helped in the development and history making of this wonderful country (Public domain ed.). Los Angeles Examiner.
- Worden, J. Perry (1916). Sixty Years in Southern California, 1853-1913: Containing the Reminiscences of Harris Newmark (Public domain ed.). Knickerbocker Press.
