= Joseph Loeb =

Joseph Loeb may refer to:

- Jeph Loeb, American film and television writer, producer and comic book writer
- Joseph P. Loeb (1883–1974), lawyer from Los Angeles, California
