= Newmark family of Southern California =

Southern Californian family

The Newmark family of Southern California was a Jewish-American family of West Prussian heritage which engaged in commerce, land ownership and land development in Los Angeles County, California, during the 19th Century. Family members included:

- Joseph Newmark (1799–1881), who was born in Neumark, West Prussia. He moved to New York in 1823 and there helped found B'nai Jeshurun. He lived in St. Louis, Missouri, from 1840 to 1845 and was president of a temple there. He, his wife, Rosa, and six children moved to Los Angeles, California, in 1854, where, as a certified shochet, he conducted religious services, weddings and funerals for the Jewish community until they could obtain aan professionalordained rabbi. In 1855 he founded the Hebrew Benefit Society, and in 1862 was the founding president of Congregation B'nai B'rith (today's Wilshire Boulevard Temple). He was an officer of Los Angeles' first Masonic lodge.
- Harris Newmark (1834–1916), Joseph's nephew, who arrived in Los Angeles in 1853 and opened several enterprises, including a wholesale grocery, a winery and a distillery. He was a member of the committee that brought the Southern Pacific to Los Angeles and was an organizer of the Agriculture Society of the Sixth District, the Public Library and the Chamber of Commerce. In his real-estate activities he was the owner of Rancho Santa Anita and one of the developers of Montebello, California. He was the author of Sixty Years in Southern California, 1853–1913.
- Joseph P. Newmark, brother to Harris and nephew of the elder Joseph was born in Löbau, West Prussia in 1827. He came to America in 1848, traveled to Kentucky, back to New York, and 1852 to Los Angeles, where he opened a clothing store with Jacob Rich. He then invited his brother Harris to come from Prussia to join the business, forming a wholesale-retail dry goods store called Newmark, Kremer & Co. with him plus their uncle Joseph, and Maurice Kremer. Joseph P. Newmark left the partnership shortly thereafter and moved to San Francisco, where he became a merchandise broker. He retired in 1888 and then returned to Los Angeles.
- Myer J. Newmark (1838–1911) was the youngest city attorney in the history of Los Angeles, California, and was active in the affairs of that city in the 19th and early 20th centuries.
- Samuel Newmark, founder and first president of the Hillcrest Country Club.
