= Joseph P. Loeb =

American lawyer

- Born: 1883; Los Angeles, California
- Died: 1974
- Education: Los Angeles High School; University of California, Berkeley
- Occupation: Lawyer
- Spouse: Amy Cordelia Kahn
- Children: Kathleen, Margaret
- Father: Leon Loeb
- Relatives: Harris Newmark (grandfather)

Joseph P. Loeb (1883–1974) was an American lawyer and public servant.

== Early life ==
Joseph O. Loeb was born in 1883 in Los Angeles, California.

== Father ==
His father, Leon (Leopold) Loeb, was born to a Jewish family in Alsace, France, and immigrated to Los Angeles in 1853 where he opened a dry goods store. Given that Los Angeles was a small city at the time (5,000 population), he quickly met Harris Newmark, a prominent established Jewish businessman; and in 1879 married his daughter Estelle. His grandfather was the author of My Sixty Years in Southern California 1853–1913. Harris Newmark had emigrated from Löbau (also spelled Loebau), Prussia.

In 1874, he joined with his cousin, Marc Eugene Meyer, Constant Meyer, and Nathan Cahn to purchase the S. Lazard & Co. business from Solomon Lazard, and thence operated as Eugene Meyer & Co. In January 1879, Leopold Loeb was added as a partner to Eugene Meyer & Co. In October 1883 the Meyers sold out, Eugene Meyer moved to San Francisco, Emmanuel L. Stern was admitted, and the three partners formed Stern, Cahn & Loeb. At this time Stern, Cahn & Loeb started promoting the store as "The City of Paris" later after the departure of Mr. Cahn becoming Stern, Loeb & Co..

Meyer had also been the French Consular Agent in Los Angeles, and he recommended Leopold Loeb to take as consul, which he did in 1883. Leopold Loeb served as the French Consular Agent for over fifteen years.

=== Brother (Edwin Loeb) ===
Joseph's younger brother Edwin J. Loeb graduated from Los Angeles High School in 1904. Both brothers earned law degrees from the University of California, Berkeley. Joseph was the editor of The Daily Californian and Phi Beta Kappa.

== Legal Practice ==
After Joseph's graduation he law clerked with the Henry O’Melveny law firm. In 1906, he was admitted to the bar in Los Angeles and retained his association with the O’Melveny firm until 1907. At that time, he joined Edward G. Kuster in the practice of law; and, in 1908, they, along with Edwin, formed the law firm of Kuster, Loeb & Loeb. Edwin and Joseph Loeb read proof for their grandfather, Harris Newmark, at the time of the publication of his book on Southern California.

About 1911, Edward Kuster left the law office, and the firm of Loeb & Loeb was established. Over the years, the firm has operated under various names: Lowenthal, Loeb & Walker; Loeb, Walker & Loeb, to the current name, Loeb & Loeb, in 1938. Joseph's contribution to the firm was the handling of corporate business accounts. (Edwin took care of their movie studio clients.) In particular, the firm become notable for representing their cousin Kaspare Cohn's enterprises: Kaspare Cohn Hospital (later Cedars of Lebanon, and now known as Cedars-Sinai Medical Center) and Kaspare Cohn Bank (now Union Bank of California), where he was a director. The Loeb & Loeb firm went from a two-man practice in its beginnings to a large international law firm.

== Political and Charitable Activities ==
In 1943, Joseph Loeb was appointed by Governor Earl Warren to serve as a member of the California State Board of Education, in which capacity he served until 1956. From 1947 until 1972, he was a member of the Board of Fellows of Claremont Colleges.

His charitable, political, and educational activities were extensive and included: President of Hillcrest Country Club (Los Angeles): 1933–1937, Board of Directors of Los Angeles County Bar Association: 1915–1922, President of United Jewish Welfare Fund: 1937; and General Campaign Chairman: 1938, Founder, Director and First President of Southern California Chapter of the Arthritis Foundation, Director of Jewish Orphans Home of Southern California (now called Vista Del Mar Child Care Service): 1916–1939; from 1920–1926 he was its President, and Board of Governors, Los Angeles Civic Light Opera Association.

== Personal life ==
Loeb married Amy Cordelia Kahn (1885–1967) of San Francisco on January 24, 1909. They were the parents of two daughters: Kathleen (Mrs. Edward J. Bernath), born November 11, 1910; and Margaret (Mrs. Edward J. Soares), born June 10, 1913. Mr. Loeb retired from law practice in June 1965.

== Death ==
He died on July 18, 1974.
