= Simon Lazard =

Franco-American banker (1828–1898)

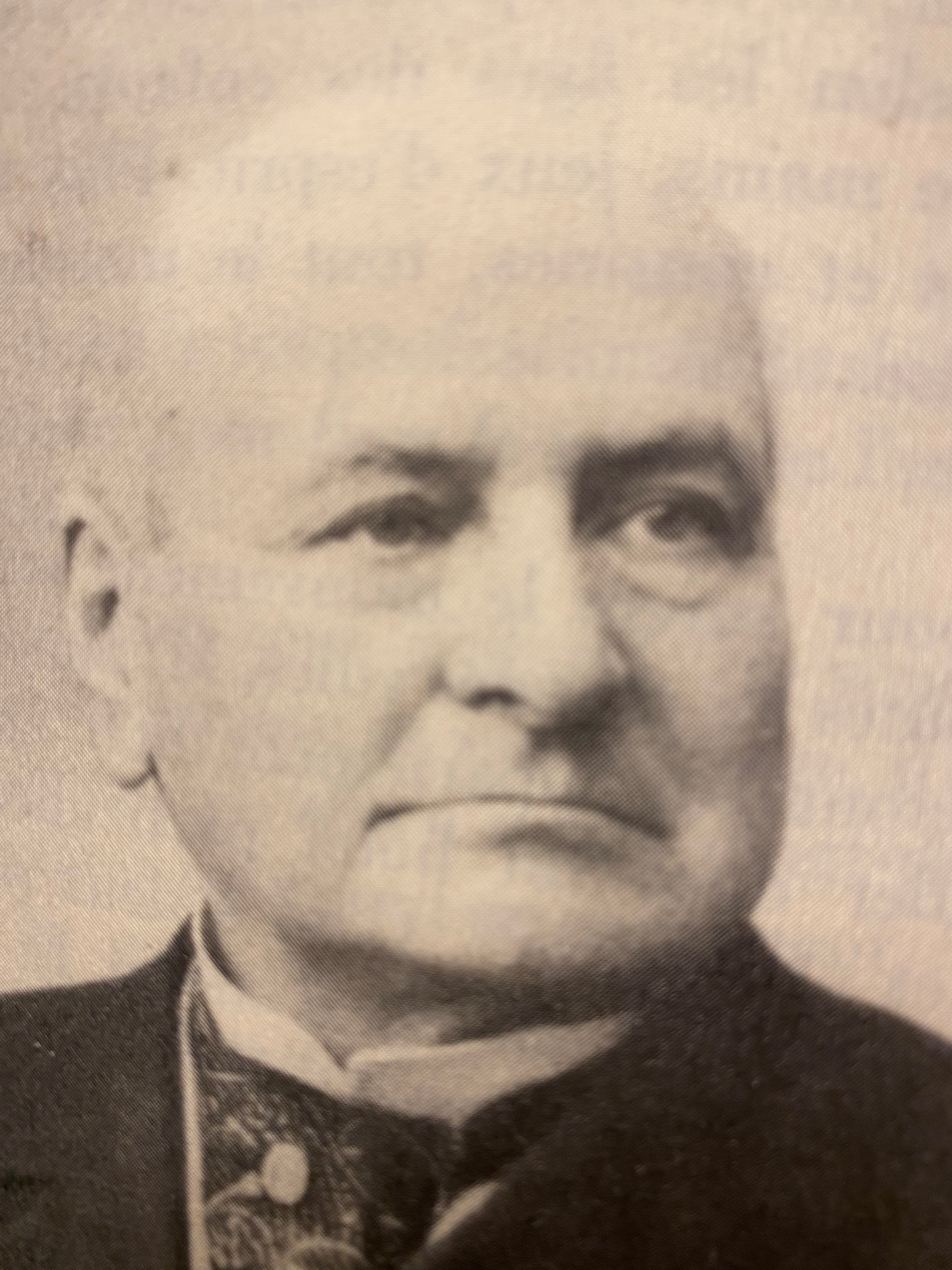
- Born: April 8, 1828; Frauenberg, Moselle
- Died: February 24, 1898 (age 69)
- Occupation: Banker
- Known for: Co-founder of Lazard Frères & Co.
- Spouse: Rose Hélène Foy
- Parent(s): Elie Lazard; Esther Aron Lazard Cahn
- Relatives: Solomon Lazard (cousin)

Simon Lazard (April 8, 1828 – February 24, 1898) was a Franco-American banker who co-founded Lazard Frères & Co., reorganized in 2000 as Lazard.

A native of Lorraine, France, a young merchant of antebellum New Orleans, pioneer of the California gold rush, and, finally, an international banker by the end of the nineteenth century, Simon Lazard with his brothers in Lazard Freres had built high-level financial relationships in business and government within a network encompassing France, England, and the U.S.

== Family ==
Simon Lazard was born to a Jewish family on April 8, 1828, in Frauenberg, Moselle, Lorraine, in northeast France. He was the son of Elie Lazard (1796–1831), a farmer, and Esther (née Aron, 1798–1875). His father died when he was three, and his mother was remarried to Moïse Cahn (1796–1872), also of Frauenberg. He was the fifth oldest of the household’s eleven children, seven fathered by Elie and four by Moïse, a close-knit family. Note: In early American newspapers, for the younger half-brother and half-sister Cahn siblings, the name Cahn Lazard was sometimes used, recognition of a connection to their elder Lazard half-siblings. That name is used here.

== New Orleans ==
In 1844, at the age 16, he moved to New Orleans where his older brothers Lazare (1821-1875) and Alexandre (1823-1904) had previously moved following an uncle. They were soon joined by their brothers Maurice (1825-1891) and Elie Lazard (1831-1897). New Orleans in the early 1840s was the United States' third-largest city, the trade hub for the South, and had the largest concentration of French language speakers. The brothers, all in their teens and early twenties, opened Lazard Frères & Co. at Poydras and Carondelet Streets, a few blocks from the Mississippi River landing, a small shop that offered fancy and staple dry goods, for “a very small profit.” Simon and his brothers signed a partnership agreement for “Lazard Frères” on July 12, 1848, the birth certificate of today’s multi-national Lazard, the world’s largest independent investment bank.

== California gold rush ==
In late 1848, news of the California gold discovery swept up the brothers. The oldest, Lazare, left New Orleans first, in 1849. On January 16, 1850, Simon boarded the steamship Falcon bound for California via Chagres, the Isthmus of Panama, and the Pacific Coast. Maurice and Elie followed after the summer sales, announcing to the press their planned “temporary absence,” and the purchase of 200 barrels of Kentucky whiskey for the San Francisco market. (Elie's name shows on the July 25, 1850, census of New Orleans and the October 10, 1850, census at Sacramento as a clerk with cousin Maurice Kremer, suggesting a quick transfer to the gold fields). While Simon set up shop in booming San Francisco’s waterfront, Alexandre made a quick buying trip to England and France, an annual event after moving to California, the standard process for the brothers during their 1850s merchant business — one of the brothers on extended, annual buying trips to New York or Europe, while the other brothers operated the thriving business.

During its first years, Lazard Frères & Co. moved frequently. Their first store was destroyed in San Francisco’s catastrophic May 1851 fire, then to Montgomery and Pine Streets, followed by Maynard’s Row on California Street, in 1855 to 64 Sacramento Street, and subsequently to 215-217 Battery.

In the 1860s, they moved into their own building, a grand store at 525-527 Market Street, which was a multi-story structure with sales rooms below and office above. The firm specialized in drygoods, from worker’s boots and trousers to fancy French goods, including linens, wine and champagne. They wholesaled goods to miningcamp traders, while also serving as agents for European firms, selling goods in the booming California market. (San Francisco had grown from 459 people in 1847 to an estimated 50,000 by 1856.) In this instant city, Lazard Frères became one of the biggest retailers and wholesalers of English and French made goods, while Simon handled money trading and banking, a growing but informal part of the business.

== Gold exchange and expanding business ==
From the first they dealt in gold dust, in exchange for goods to miners, then as separate purchase of precious metal bullion (or, in reality, a crude dore bar), which they shipped back to France for assay and sales. Beginning with a shipment in March 1851 of $5,000 in nuggets and dust, by 1853 they had shipped over a quarter-million dollars' worth of precious metals. Simon’s initial trade-dust and bullion business expanded to include currency exchanges and banknotes.

Profits from these activities were funneled into real estate investments, offerings of loans and mortgages, and other businesses, part of what had become a bank in all but name. About 1860, looking for new business opportunities, Simon purchased a part of the Mission Woolen Mills and, later, the Pacific Woolen Mills, which profited from government contracts especially during the Civil War.

Simon, or rather Lazard Frères & Co., expanded its investments, especially after the 1859 silver discovery of the Comstock Lode in Nevada. With Joseph Aron, Elie and Simon managed silver-bullion shipments between California and Paris and helped finance the Sutro Tunnel Company to bore four miles into the hill below the lode. Aron served as the tunnel-company president before moving to New York City in 1876. The firm also loaned funds to operations and became part owners, usually through mortgage foreclosures of mining properties, including the Brunswick mine on the lode and the rich Raymond & Ely silver mine at Pioche, Nevada. These sometimes risky speculations continuously caused rifts among the more conservative brothers and their extended family.

== Humanitarian activities ==
Simon was also active in the wider social and political movements. In October 1850, he joined with 12 other young men to form San Francisco’s Eureka Benevolent Society. They provided funds and help with those who might be in want. During the early years, antiforeigner sentiment was felt for non-English speakers and as tensions rose some anti-French violence was threatened. Civil law calmed the situation, but, in 1851, Simon with his multi-lingual brothers became American citizens, he said that it was "a mere formality, but the law required me.” Simon became active in the People’s Reform Party, organized to expose fraud in local government, cut taxes, and expand the liberal vote. He also was active later in the French Benevolent Society of California. Lazard Frères also donated funds to an odd mix of causes: the Polish independence movement, the National Sanitary Fund of the Civil War era, a Jewish child threatened by Italian priests in Rome, and a national French Patriotism movement of the Franco-Prussian War era. In 1871, when those in San Franciscans raised funds to aid the victims of the Franco-Prussian War in France, they sent the 112,000 francs to Simon to distribute.

== Family in America ==
As the dry goods business grew, more help was needed and younger members of the family were brought from France to San Francisco. During the 1850s and early 1860s, younger half-brothers Simon Sylvain Cahn Lazard (1837-1871) and David Cahn Lazard (1843-1916) became salesmen, clerks, or bookkeepers, while cousins fr:Alexandre Weill (banquier) and Henri Weill, and Maurice Kremer and Solomon Lazard (before they opened their own store in 1852 Los Angeles) worked for the firm. (cousins Alexandre and Henri’s sister, Esther Weill, married Lazard brother Maurice; Alexandre Weill strengthened his bond to the Lazards by marrying their youngest sister, Julie Cahn Lazard, in 1867). The brothers Lazard also helped with their brother-in-law Theodore Weill’s tobacco-importing firm (sister Lisa [1826-1908] was his wife, and half-sister Adelaide Cahn Lazard [1838-1892] married his partner, Joseph Aron, who was the later Sutro tunnel project president). The closeness of the Lazard-Cahn-Weill-Aron family and primogenitor laws has been pointed to as one of the financial and social strengths of the Lazard Frères firm in the nineteenth century.

== Lazard Frères, international bankers ==
The Lazard brothers came to California with the intention of working, saving, and returning home after becoming rich, a motive widely shared by immigrants of all backgrounds. With the infusion of younger talent at the same time the international business continued to grow, the Lazards decided to permanently return home and establish headquarters in Paris. A July 20, 1858, agreement established Lazard Frères et Cie. Alexandre, Maurice and Lazare had already moved back to Paris.

In 1861, after the completion of the transcontinental telegraph to San Francisco improved communication, thirty-three-year-old Simon left permanently for Paris; brother Elie followed five years later. Close brother-in-law Alexandre Weill and the youngest brothers, S. Sylvain and David Cahn Lazard, tutored by Simon and Elie, remained in San Francisco as partners and local managers. Alexandre Weill and brother-in-law David Cahn Lazard would become leaders of the American offices of Lazard Frères & Co. with the departure of the older Lazard brothers (the popular S. Sylvain Cahn Lazard had died of typhoid in San Francisco in July 1871).

With the establishment of Lazard Frères import-export offices in New York City and London during the 1870s, the firm became truly multinational. Simon and his brothers held the partner shares of the new offices.

In 1876, Lazard Frères, after continuing to move towards the banking business, decided to take advantage of the turmoil, caused by the Panic of 1873 and the collapse of several California banks, to focus on banking. Simon returned to San Francisco to liquidate the drygoods business and reopened Lazard Frères & Co. as bankers at 205 Sansome Street in the financial district of San Francisco. By the 1880s, the Lazard Frères offices in Paris, London, New York, and San Francisco, managed by family members, became one of the strongest international commercial and investment banks.

In 1887, Simon called David Cahn Lazard back to Paris to help manage from afar the California business. David Cahn was the last sibling of the Lazard brothers to leave America. Previously, in 1884, Simon had organized the London, Paris, and American Bank Ltd with Elie and with him on the board of directors. It took over the bank business in San Francisco. With David’s departure, Simon and Alexandre selected Marc Eugene Meyer, the first non-Lazard family member, to be in charge of the bank and Lazard Frères & Co.’s San Francisco office.

Meyer, cousin of Alexandre Weill, was hired by Simon in 1859 as a stockboy at the San Francisco store, before he went out on his own in Los Angeles. Courted back to Lazard Frères, he expanded banking operations in the West. By the 1890s, Meyer followed Alexandre Weill’s career track to the New York City office as the Wall Street operation eclipsed those in San Francisco. In coordination with the Paris and London offices and assisted by George Blumenthal (banker), he shaped Lazard Frères New York as a major speculator in railroad and utilities stocks and bonds as well as mastered the securities and precious-metals markets including sensational gold shipments to France. One newspaper commentator noted, Lazard Frères “used to buy lots of silver bullion in San Francisco. They deal in the yellow metal in New York.” He added: “The sensations in Wall Street by these old Pacific coasters is in the matter of gold shipments — the bane of the stock bulls.”

Importantly, Lazard Frères & Co. were to orchestrate a financial empire that specialized in sending millions of dollars' worth of gold and silver bullion from New York City to bolster France’s currency during the economic fluctuations of the 1880s and 1890s, while also profiting from the higher goldmarket prices paid in Europe. This arbitrage business expanded after the 1882 Paris Bourse crisis. In Paris, Simon served as the American representative for the Banque de France. During the American financial Panic of 1893, he, Weill, the Lazard Frères et Cie, with the Lazard Freres & Co. New York office, Meyer and George Blumenthal (banker), coordinated with American banker J.P. Morgan to ship gold across the Atlantic to replenish the U.S. Treasury’s declining gold supply. The infusion saved the U.S. Treasury.

== Personal life ==
In 1867, Simon Lazard married Eve Rose Hélène Foy (1846-1915) and was the father of six children, including Lazard Frères banker André Lazard, an economist and sociologist fr:Max Lazard and Esther Lazard Fould, married to French industrialist fr:René Fould. He died at his home at 48 rue des Belles Feuilles in Paris, February 24, 1898.
