= Myer J. Newmark =

American politician

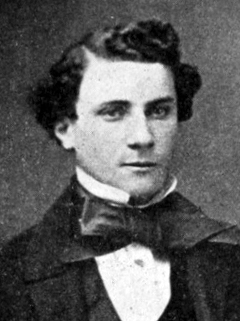

12th Los Angeles City Attorney
- In office May 7, 1862 – September 15, 1862
- Preceded by: Jesse H. Laber
- Succeeded by: Alfred Chapman

Personal details
- Born: 1838 New York City, New York
- Died: May 10, 1911 (aged 72–73) Los Angeles, California

Myer Joseph Newmark (1838–1911) was the youngest city attorney in the history of Los Angeles, California, and was active in the affairs of that city in the 19th and early 20th centuries.

== Personal ==
=== Background ===
Newmark was born in 1838 in New York City, the son of Joseph Newmark of Germany and Rosa Levy Newmark of England. The second of six children, Myer Newmark received his primary education first in New York and then in England, where he lived with his mother's parents. He returned to New York at age 13. He attended Columbia College in New York, and he also spent 18 months in a lawyer's office, studying law.

In December 1852, the family of two adults and six children followed the Gold Rush of 1849 by way of Cape Horn to California and arrived there in April 1853. The Newmarks moved to Los Angeles in 1857, but young Myer, at age 16, returned to San Francisco until he was 19, when he went back to Los Angeles.

He and Sophie Cahen, a "recent French emigrant," were married on June 7, 1874, in the San Francisco residence of the bride's parents. The ceremony was "conducted by Joseph Newmark. Esq., father of the groom, assisted by the Rev. Dr. Eckman." The couple had three children, the first being a daughter, Sophie, born in Los Angeles in 1879 and married on September 11, 1902, to Alfred Sutro, nephew of Adolph Sutro of San Francisco. They also had a son, Henry M.(Myer) Newmark, and a younger daughter Rosa Newmark.

For three years, he and his family lived in Nice, France.

Newmark died in San Francisco on May 10, 1911 after an illness of two days.

=== Attributes ===
A Los Angeles Herald reporter wrote in 1900 that Newmark at the age of 62 was "under medium height," with "clear, gray eyes," who "betrays nervous energy in every movement. He is a restless being—one of those high-strung men who must ever be on the move. Five minutes of actual repose would be actual punishment to him. . . . That he ever managed to hold himself down to the plodding drudgery of his books long enough to master the dry details of law is a mystery . . . ."

== Avocation ==
=== Private enterprise ===
As a young adult in San Francisco, Newmark "embarked, in a boyish way, in mercantile pursuits," then sold his business for enough cash to enable him to study law independently in Los Angeles. He was admitted to practice in the local courts when he was 21 and to the California Supreme Court at age 22.

He formed his first partnership with Edward J. C. Kewen and his second with Joseph Lancaster Brent, but Brent left to fight with the Confederates at the outbreak of the U.S. Civil War, so Newmark linked up with Volney E. Howard. In May 1862, Newmark was elected Los Angeles city attorney; he thus became the youngest person who would ever serve in that position. He resigned in September 1862 to open a law practice in Nevada.

Newmark next practiced law in San Francisco, with Henry J. Labatt and Robert T. Payne, until 1865, "when he retired because of pressing business interests," those including a six-year stint in New York City, where he bought and sold goods for California enterprises.

In 1871 Newmark went into business in Los Angeles with Harris Newmark, and in 1874 he was operating a wholesale grocery and hardware establishment on Los Angeles Street near First.

By 1895, Newmark had returned to Los Angeles and joined with Kaspare Cohn in a firm that handled wool and hides on commission.

=== Public service ===
When Newmark was in Los Angeles in 1857 at age 19 he was active as a member of the Mechanics Institute, and he "was instrumental in organizing the Los Angeles Chamber of Commerce," becoming its president in 1900.

Newmark, along with William H. Workman, Samuel Foy and others, helped to open a public reading room of donated books at Arcadia and Los Angeles streets, which became the forerunner of the Los Angeles Public Library. He was on the board of trustees of the library from 1899 to 1901.

A Democrat, Newmark was appointed United States consul in Nice, France, in 1888 under the Grover Cleveland administration and remained there three years.

In July 1898 Newmark was elected one of the fifteen members of a commission to draft a new city charter for Los Angeles, and in 1903 he was appointed by the county Board of Supervisors to be a member of a commission to investigate the possibility of merging the city with the county. He declined, stating that he was "in sympathy with the movement" but could not attend the organizational meeting. In 1902 he was part of a movement for a state constitutional amendment that would provide for "a system of direct legislation, state, county and municipal."

In 1900 Newmark was on a committee working to establish a Children's Hospital in Los Angeles, and three years later he was working to find a site for a proposed convention hall in the city.

== Diary ==
When Newmark, then about 12 years old, sailed to California with his family from New York City, he kept a diary he titled "Incidents of a Voyage from New York to San Francisco around Cape Horn in the good ship Carrington, F.B. French Commander. Commenced Dec 15, 1852. Ended April 20th 1853." The work was donated to the Southwest Museum by Henry M. Newmark before 1931. The original pages were pasted onto linen and tipped into a leather-bound volume.

== References and notes ==
Preceded by James H. Lader	Los Angeles City Attorney; Myer Joseph Newmark; 1862	Succeeded by Alfred Chapman
