= Florence Meyer =

American photographer (1911–1962)

Florence Meyer Homolka
- Photo of Meyer by Man Ray
- Born: Florence Meyer; January 22, 1911; New York City, U.S.
- Died: November 27, 1962 (aged 51); Santa Monica, California, U.S.
- Occupations: Portrait photographer and socialite
- Spouse: Oscar Homolka (m. 1939; div. 1948)
- Children: 2
- Parents: Eugene Meyer (father); Agnes Elizabeth Ernst (mother)
- Relatives: Katharine Graham (sister); Marc Eugene Meyer (grandfather); Joseph Newmark (great-grandfather)

Florence Meyer Homolka (January 22, 1911 – November 27, 1962) was an American portrait photographer and socialite. She was married to the actor Oscar Homolka.

== Early life and education ==
She was born in New York City, the eldest daughter of Eugene Meyer (1875–1959), future publisher of the Washington Post, and Agnes Elizabeth (Ernst) Meyer (1887–1970). Along with her four siblings, she was baptized as a Lutheran but attended an Episcopal church.

She attended the Madeira School and Bryn Mawr College, graduated from Radcliffe College.

== Photography ==
Meyer photographed numerous artists, playwrights, actors, writers, composers, musicians, statesmen, film stars, and other celebrities of her day. Her work included portraits of Van Cliburn, James Agee, Thomas Mann, Constantin Brâncuși, Charlie Chaplin, Judy Garland, Vladimir Horowitz, Lion Feuchtwanger, Arnold Schoenberg, Christopher Isherwood and of fellow photographers Edward Steichen, Walker Evans, and Brassaï.

Meyer was a close friend and protégée of Man Ray, and in 1946 took the photographs for the double wedding portraits of Man Ray and Juliet Browner, and Max Ernst and Dorothea Tanning. Meyer exhibited her photographs at the Palos Verdes Art Gallery in 1950 and at Los Angeles City Hall in 1952.

Meyer played the Juggler and the Priestess of the Golden Calf in the original Broadway cast of Kurt Weill's The Eternal Road (1937). She was the author of Focus on Art, published posthumously in 1962, with a foreword by Aldous Huxley.

== Personal life ==
In 1939, Meyer married the widowed Austrian character actor Oscar Homolka (1898–1978). They had two sons, Vincent and Laurence. They divorced in 1946, but the financial details of the divorce were contested as late as 1952. She died from a respiratory attack in Santa Monica in 1962, at the age of 51.
