= Aline Meyer Liebman =

American artist and collector (1879–1966)

- Photo by Edward Weston
- Born: Aline Meyer; June 24, 1879; Los Angeles, US
- Died: August 21, 1966 (aged 87)
- Known for: Painting; art collector; museum benefactor
- Movement: Modernism
- Spouse: Charles J. Liebman
- Parent(s): Marc Eugene Meyer and Harriet Newmark Meyer
- Relatives: Florence Meyer Blumenthal (sister); Eugene Meyer (brother)

Aline Meyer Liebman (1879–1966) was an American painter, photographer, collector of modern art, and patron of the arts.

== Early life and education ==
Liebman was born on June 24, 1879, in Los Angeles, the daughter of Marc Eugene Meyer, president of Lazard Frères in the US, and Harriet Newmark Meyer. In 1893 her family moved to New York where she first studied at Barnard College. She then studied at the Art Students League of New York and was later mentored by the photographers, Clarence Hudson White and Alfred Stieglitz, developing a lifelong interest in modern photography, and by the artists, Georgia O'Keeffe and Henry Mosler, among others. She began collecting art in her teens, with eclectic tastes that included modern decorative craft, oriental art, sculpture, furniture, textiles, glassware, china, jewellery and books. In 1908, she married Charles J. Liebman, an industrialist.

== Later life ==
Her appreciation of photography led to her becoming a major benefactor of Stieglitz, providing funding for his galleries in New York. She also purchased photographs by Edward Weston, Ansel Adams, Edward Steichen and Paul Strand, developing a collection that was subsequently acknowledged as of national importance by the Museum of Modern Art (MoMA) in New York. She was one of the earliest supporters when that museum was founded in 1929 and in 1934 assisted with its outreach project in Westchester County, New York, loaning items from her collection in both cases. Among the artists whose works she loaned to MoMA over the years were Constantin Brâncuși, Diego Rivera, Pablo Picasso, John Marin, Maurice de Vlaminck, Paul Gauguin, and O’Keeffe. She served on various committees of the museum and, in 1948, made a substantial donation specifically for the purchase of photographic work by younger artists. Her sisters, Rosalie Meyer Stern and Florence Meyer Blumenthal were also avid collectors and supporters of young artists.

Liebman owned at least three paintings by O'Keeffe and also collected works by Max Ernst and Marsden Hartley, among others. She organized sales of young artists' work, providing workshops as well as a gallery and shop, which offered a commercial outlet for both poor and disabled artists and craft-workers. As a friend of Eleanor Roosevelt, she urged her to support modern art. She painted most mornings and often sketched and painted during long visits to Europe between 1925 and 1935. She took part in several group exhibitions of the Salons of America, which organized exhibitions between 1922 and 1936. Her work often showed the influence of her trips to Europe, particularly the paintings of Gauguin and Matisse. Also continuing to take photographs, she created her own darkroom at home. Her work was included in Sixty Photographs: A Survey of Camera Esthetics, MoMA's first photographic exhibition, in 1940.

Liebman had her first solo exhibition in 1937, at the Walker Gallery in New York, showing landscapes and still-life subjects, mainly in tempera, which she had learnt from Stefan Hirsch. Her paintings received good reviews and her style was compared to that of Raoul Dufy. She was always reluctant to sell her paintings, but did sell a few. She followed this with two further one-woman shows in 1937, at the San Francisco Museum of Modern Art (SFMOMA) and at Bennington College in Vermont. In 1939 she had an exhibition at the Portland Museum of Art in Portland, Maine. In 1944, she designed a poster for the New York League of Women Voters, urging women to use their vote. This was displayed throughout the city and featured in various publications.

At the end of 1942 she was preparing for a one-woman show at the Weyhe gallery in New York when she received a visit from Peggy Guggenheim and Ernst, who were organizing the Exhibition by 31 Women at Guggenheim's Art of This Century gallery. Initially reluctant to contribute a work, she eventually selected a triptych painted on masonite, called Story in Paint. At the age of 63, Liebman was the oldest artist to be represented at the show. She exhibited at the Weyhe gallery in the same year, and again in 1947, which was her last solo exhibition, when her paintings included several portraits.

== Death ==
Liebman died at her home in Sutton House, New York on August 21, 1966. Her husband predeceased her. She had a son and a daughter. Her daughter donated her papers, consisting of biographical details and correspondence, to the Archives of American Art in 1986 and 1989.
