= Frederick Jacobi =

American composer

Frederick Jacobi as musician in the Alcatraz Army Band.

Frederick Jacobi (May 4, 1891 – October 24, 1952) was a Jewish-American composer and teacher. His works include symphonies, concerti, chamber music, works for solo piano and for solo organ, lieder, and one opera.

He taught at Juilliard School of Music from 1936 to 1950, where his pupils included Mark Bucci, Alexei Haieff, Vera Nicolaevna Preobrajenska, Julia Frances Smith, Robert Starer, John Verrall, and Robert Ward. He also served as the director of the American section of the International Society for Contemporary Music and was a founding member of the League of Composers. He died on October 24, 1952, in New York City of heart failure.

== Biography ==
=== Early life ===
Jacobi was the son of San Francisco wholesale wine merchant, Frederick Jacobi Sr. and Flora Brandenstein (daughter of tobacco wholesaler Joseph Brandenstein), whom Frederick Sr. had married in 1876. During the composer's childhood years, he demonstrated his musical talent, composing short pieces at the piano and playing tunes from contemporary musical comedies by ear. In these years the family traveled each summer to visit relatives in New York City. The scenery of those cross-country train rides later provided the themes of a number of Jacobi's nature-inspired compositions.

=== Musical training and career ===
When Frederick Sr. died in 1911, Frederick Jr. inherited the estate, which provided him enough wealth that he could devote his entire livelihood to music. In his twenties Jacobi studied music and composition under such masters as Isidor Philipp of the Paris Conservatory, Rafael Joseffy, Paolo Gallico, Ernest Bloch and Rubin Goldmark in New York, and Paul Juon in Berlin.

From 1913 to 1917 he worked as a vocal coach and assistant conductor at the Metropolitan Opera. It was during that time, on April 19, 1917, that he married Irene Schwarcz, a friend of many years, who, at the time, was studying piano at the New York Institute of Musical Art (which later became Juilliard). Irene would go on to become an accomplished concert pianist and would play piano parts in many performances and recordings of Jacobi's works.

Jacobi enlisted in the army shortly after marrying Irene, where he served as a saxophone player in the Alcatraz Army Band. He was discharged in 1919, at which time he moved to New York to be in closer contact with the American composers of the time. His first large orchestral work, The Eve of St. Agnes, debuted the following year in New York. For the remainder of his life he published and performed new works nearly every year—sometimes several in the same year (see compositions section). Major American orchestras such as the New York Philharmonic, the Philadelphia Orchestra, and the Boston, Chicago, and San Francisco symphonies performed Jacobi's orchestral compositions during the years of his life.

In works from what has become known as Jacobi's Indian period (late 1920s and early 1930s), he incorporated rhythms and other elements from indigenous Native American music he had heard in his travels through the American southwest. Indeed, he spent the winter of 1927 with the Navajo and Pueblo of New Mexico studying their music. In 1942-1944 Jacobi collaborated with Canadian playwright and librettist, Herman Voaden, to produce the opera, The Prodigal Son, which debuted at the American Opera Society of Chicago in May 1945.

== Legacy ==
Jacobi is also known and best remembered as a composer of works with Judaic themes. His interest in this genre began with a 1930 commission from Congregation Emanu-El of the City of New York for a sabbath evening service. Although he had not been religiously educated as a child, this experience affected him permanently, and thereafter the Bible influenced all of his music, secular and liturgical. He even taught himself Hebrew. Although Jacobi's secular work is performed only infrequently today, his liturgical works continue to receive performances in synagogues.

Jacobi's work largely rejects the polytonality and atonality that was popular with the avant-garde composers of his time. Instead he finds his influence in the classical and romantic periods. Baltimore Sun critic, Florestan Croche, described Jacobi's style as having "a sense of the drama which is always aristocratic, introspective, and personal, and never allowed to become theatrical. Harmonically ... his is a language of extreme chromaticism, one, however, which always appears to be tonally oriented." New York Times critic, Olin Downes, described the aesthetics of Jacobi's music as "not so much of the 20th as of the 19th century."

== Awards and honors ==
- Honorable mention in the Elizabeth Sprague Coolidge Competition, 1924
- Two-time winner of the award of the Society for the Publication of American Music
- David Bispham Medal awarded by The American Opera Society for The Prodigal Son.

Source: New York Times

== Quotes on musical composition and anecdotes ==
- "I am a great believer in melody; a believer, too, that music should give pleasure and not try to solve philosophical problems."
- "The surest way to kill whatever originality one possesses within himself is to try to be original!"
- Irene was in a box near the Metropolitan Opera stage one evening when Frederick Jacobi was the prompter. After the performance she said, "Darling, you were wonderful. I heard every word you said!"

== Discography ==
- RCA Victor Red Seal, M 782, 1-5 (78 rpm, late 1930s)

Hagiographia: Three Biblical Narratives for String Quartet and Piano. Irene Jacobi, piano; with the Coolidge Quartet: William Kroll, 1st violin; Nicolai Berezowsky, 2nd violin; Nicholas Moldavan, viola; Victor Gottlieb, cello

- SPA [Society for Participating Artists] Records 7 Saratoga Springs, NY

Concerto for Violin and Orchestra. Andre Gertler and the Orchestra of the Institut Nationale Belge de Radiodiffusion, Franz Andre, conductor.
Two pieces for Flute and Orchestra: Night Piece and Dance. Francis Stoefs, flute and the Orchestra of the Institut Nationale Belge de Radiodiffusion, Franz Andre, conductor.
Concertino for Piano and String Orchestra. Irene Jacobi, piano and the Orchestra of the Institut Nationale Belge de Radiodiffusion, Franz Andre, conductor.

- CRI [Composers Recordings Inc.] 146 (LP)

Ballade for Violin and Piano. Fredell Lack, violin; Irene Jacobi, piano
Fantasy for Viola and Piano. Louise Rood, viola; Irene Jacobi, piano
String Quartet No. 3. Lyric Art Quartet: Fredell Lack and George Bennett, violins; Wayne Crouse, viola; Marion Davies, cello

- CRI 174 (LP)

Concerto for Cello and Orchestra. Guido Vecchi with members of the Oslo Philharmonic Orchestra, William Strickland, conductor.
Hagiographia: Three Biblical Narratives for String Quartet and Piano. Irene Jacobi, piano; with the Claremont String Quartet: Mark Gottlieb and Vladimir Weisman, violins; Scot Nickrenz, viola; Irving Klein, cello.

- CRI 703 (CD)

Digitally remastered contents of CRI 146 and CRI 174, with the exception of the Fantasy for Viola and Piano.

- NAXOS AMERICAN CLASSICS: Milken Archive of American Jewish Music (CD)

Concerto for Violincello, and Orchestra. Alban Gerhardt, cello; Barcelona Symphony/National Orchestra of Catalonia, Karl Anton Rickenbacher, conductor.
Sabbath Evening Service (excerpts). Patrick Mason, baritone; Academy of St. Martin in the Fields Chorus, Joseph Cullen, conductor.
Hagiographia for String Quartet and Piano. Brian Krinke, violin; Perrin Yang, violin; George Taylor, viola; Stefan Reuss, cello; Joseph Werner, piano.
Ahavat Olam. Cantor Robert Bloch; New York Cantorial Choir; Aaron Miller, organ; Samuel Adler, conductor.
Two Pieces in Sabbath Mood. Slovak Radio Symphony Orchestra; Samuel Adler, conductor

== Compositions ==
- 1915 The Pied Piper, Symphonic Poem
- 1916 Three Songs to Poems by Sarojini Naidu (“The Faery Isle of Janjira,” “Love and Death,” “In the Night,” for high voice and piano)
- 1917 A California Suite (for orchestra)
- 1918 Nocturne, for string quartet
- 1918 Psalmody (piano vocal score)
- 1920 Three Songs, for high voice with piano (words by Sarojini Naidu; “Palanquin-Bearers,” “In a Time of Flowers,” “From a Latticed Balcony”)
- 1920 The Eve of Saint Agnes (25 min. Symphonic prelude after the poem of John Keats)
- 1921 Three Preludes for Violin and Piano
- 1921 Morning and Evening at Blue Hill (for two violins and string orchestra with piano)
- 1921 A Festival Prelude (for orchestra)
- 1922 Symphony No. 1 (Subtitled Assyrian, 22 min.)
- 1922 Three Songs to Poems by Chaucer (for voice and piano) “Roundel” and “Ballade” published as Two Poems by Geoffrey Chaucer
- 1923 Two Assyrian Prayers (piano vocal score)
- 1923 Two Assyrian Prayers (Soprano or Tenor and chamber orchestra, 12 min. French text by Rebecca Godchaux. “To Ishtar” and “To Bel-Marduk”)
- 1924 Three Preludes for Violin, with orchestral accompaniment
- 1924 String Quartet (Based) on (American) Indian Themes (18 min.)
- 1925 The Poet in the Desert (after the poem by C.E.S. Wood, for orchestra, chorus and baritone solo)
- 1926 Nocturne (for flute and small orchestra; 5 min.) Rewritten second movement of Symphony No. 1, 1922)
- 1926 Marsyas (for violin and piano)
- 1927-28 Indian Dances/Danses Indiennes/Indianische Tänze (16 1/2 min.) ( Buffalo Dance, Butterfly Dance, War Dance, Corn Dance; Suite for Orchestra)
- 1930-31 Sabbath Evening Service According to the Union Prayer Book (Friday Evening Service, baritone solo/cantor, mixed chorus, a capella; 20 min.)
- 1932 Concerto (Three Psalms) for Cello and Orchestra (16 min.) Reduction for Piano and Cello,
- 1933 String Quartet No. 2 (23 min.)
- 1933 Six Pieces for the Organ for Use in the Synagogue. One piece published as Prelude.
- 1933 Three Preludes for Organ.
- 1934-35 Concerto for Piano and Orchestra (26 min.)
- 1934 Piano Pieces for Children (includes A Lovely Little Movie Actress, Once Upon a Time, A Charming Prince, There Was a Wicked Fairy and Six Caprices) A Lovely Little Movie Actress and Once Upon a Time published separately.
- 1936 Scherzo for Flute, Oboe, Clarinet, Bassoon and Horn (5 min.) (Scherzo for Wind Instruments)
- 1936-37 Concerto for Violin and Orchestra (16 min.)
- 1937 Cadenza to Mozart’s Rondo for Piano and Orchestra (Köchel No. 386)
- 1937 Swing Boy (violin and piano)
- 1938 Hagiographa: Three Biblical Narratives for String Quartet and Piano (26 min.)
- 1938 Preludes on Traditional Melodies
- 1939 Ave Rota: (Hail to the Wheel [of Fortune]) Three Pieces in Multiple Style for Small Orchestra and Piano (“The Swing” [“La Balançoire”], “The Merman” and “May-Dance;” written for the Juilliard Alumni). (14 min. The same for large orchestra and piano)
- 1939 Dunam Po (“A Dunam Here”) Palestinian folk song arrangement published in Hans Nathan, ed. Folk Songs of the New Palestine.
- 194? Variations on a Theme by Moussorgsky (for cello and piano)
- 1940 Shemesh (based on a Palestinian Folk Song) Cello and Piano
- 1940 Rhapsody for Harp and String Orchestra (8 min.)
- 1941 Fantasy for Viola and Piano (9 min.)
- 1941 Ode for Orchestra (12 min.)
- 1941 Cadenza for Mozart’s Concerto for Piano and Orchestra in C Minor (Köchel No. 491)
- 1941 Night Piece for Flute and Small Orchestra (5 min.) (Rewritten Nocturne in Niniveh, 1926)
- 1941 Night Piece and Dance, for flute and piano.
- 1942 Ballade for Violin and Piano (11 min.)
- 1942 Hymn for Men’s Chorus (text by Saadia Gaon; 5 min.)
- 1942 From the Prophet Nehemiah: Three Excerpts for Voice and Two Pianos (5, 4 and 6 minutes respectively)
- 1942-44 The Prodigal Son: Opera in Three Acts based on Four Early American Prints. Text by Herman Voaden. (Full orchestra, 2 1/2 hours).
- 1943 Penelope (arrangement for viola and piano from the 1921 Vocalises.)
- 1944 Dances From The Prodigal Son Arranged for Two Pianos, Four Hands (10 min.) [polka, polonaise, waltz, tarantella]
- 1944 Night Piece for Flute, Oboe, Clarinet, String Quintet and Piano
- 1944 Music for Monticello (Trio for Flute, Cello and Piano, 20 min.)
- 1945 String Quartet No. 3 (26 min.)
- 1945 Ahavas Olom (Ahavat Olam; 3 min.) (For tenor solo/cantor mixed voices and organ)
- 1945 Kaddish (for organ)
- 1945 Toccata (for organ)
- 1945 Toccata for piano solo. From Prelude and Toccata.
- 1945 Prelude in E Minor, for piano From Prelude and Toccata.
- 1945 Impressions from the Odyssey (three pieces for violin and piano; “Ulysses,” “Penelope,” “The Return”)
- 1945 Fantasy Sonata for Piano (9 min.)
- 1945 Four Dances From The Prodigal Son (orchestra, 18 min.)
- 1946 Concertino for Piano and String Orchestra (17 min.)
- 1946 Kaddish (for cantor, chorus and organ)
- 1946 Two Pieces in Sabbath Mood (Kaddish and Oneg Shabbat) (for orchestra, 2 min. and 9 min. Originally composed as two separate works for organ solo: Kaddish and Toccata; transcribed for small orchestra, 1946)
- 1946 Moods (for piano)
- 1946 Introduction and Toccata, for piano solo
- 1946 Prelude in E Minor for piano solo
- 1946 Contemplation (to a poem by William Blake, for mixed voices with piano accompaniment; 5:30 min.)
- 1946 Toccata (for organ)
- 1947 Symphony in C (Symphony No. 2, 21 min.)
- 1947 Meditation for Trombone and Piano
- 1947 Suite Fantasque (for piano)
- 1948 Three Songs to Words by Philip Freneau (for medium voice and piano). (“On the Sleep of Plants” [1790], “Elegy” [1786], “Ode to Freedom” [1795])
- 1948 Ode to Zion (text by Jehuda Halevi) for mixed voices and two harps
- 1948 Two Dances From The Prodigal Son (arranged for piano, four hands by the composer) [waltz, polka]
- 1948 Music Hall: Overture for Orchestra (6 min.)
- 1949 Yeibichai (Yébiché): Variations for Orchestra on an American Indian Theme (9 min.)
- 1949? Tuari: Nocturne for String Orchestra (“From the [Lento movement of] the String Quartet on Indian Themes”)
- 1949 Music Hall Suite
- 1949 Fanfare, in Memory of James Whitcomb Riley: Born 1849 (wind instruments and percussion)
- 1949 Ashrey Haish (arrangement for mixed voices and string orchestra of a Zionist song by Mordecai Zaira)
- 1950 Three Quiet Preludes (for organ)
- 1950 Ballade Concertante for two pianos
- 1950 Ballade Concertante (Symphonie Concertante) for piano and orchestra
- 1950-51 Sonata for Cello and Piano
- 1951 Two Pieces for Flute and Orchestra: Night Piece and Dance (Nocturne in Nineveh and Dance
- 1951 Capriccio for Violin and Piano
- 1951 Violin Pieces (with piano; “Alpha,” “Ad Astram,” “Bärentanz”)
- 1951 Night Piece and Dancefor Flute and Piano (Nocturne in Niniveh, for flute and piano)
- 1951-52 Arvit L’Shabbat (Friday Evening Service No. 2) for organ, baritone solo/cantor, mixed voices
- 1952 O May the Words for organ and mixed voices
- 1952 Serenade (Revised Ballade/Symphonie Concertante; arrangement for two pianos by the composer)
- 1952 Serenade for Piano and Orchestra (Revised Ballade/Symphonie Concertante)

Source: Anton Wagner, Frederick Jacobi and Herman Voaden
