= City of Paris (Los Angeles) =

Los Angeles' first department store

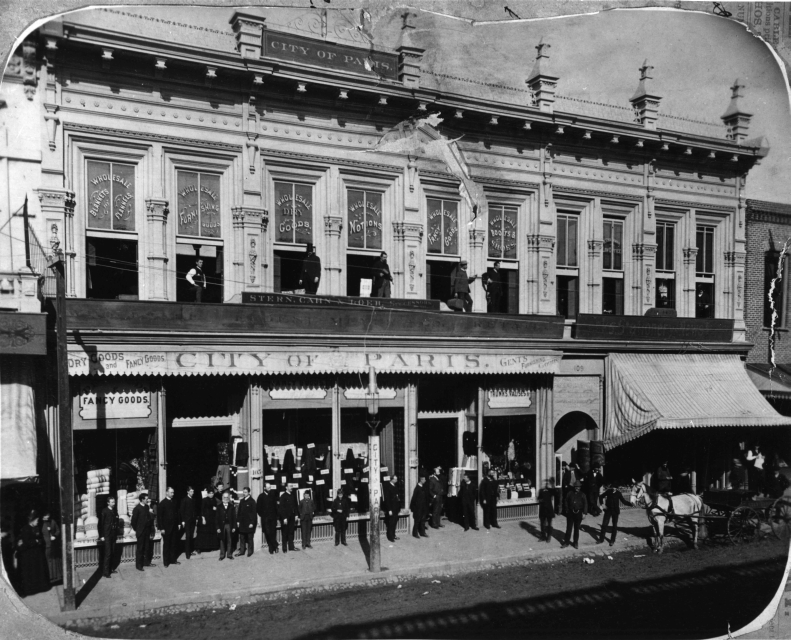
Stern, Cahn & Loeb's City of Paris department store at 105-7 North Spring Street (post-1890 numbering: 205-7 Spring), sometime between 1883 and 1890

City of Paris (originally S. Lazard & Co.) was a dry goods store and eventually Los Angeles' first department store, operating from the 1850s through 1897, first as Lazard & Kremer Co., then Lazard & Wolfskill Co., then S. Lazard & Co., then with the store name City of Paris operated by Eugene Meyer & Co., then by Stern, Cahn & Loeb. It should not be confused with the much more famous City of Paris store of San Francisco, or the Ville de Paris department store of Los Angeles, of Mr. A. Fusenot, which was a spinoff of San Francisco's "City of Paris".

== History ==
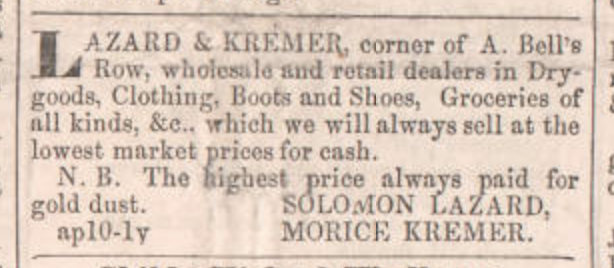
Ad for Lazard and Kremer in the Los Angeles Star October 30, 1852

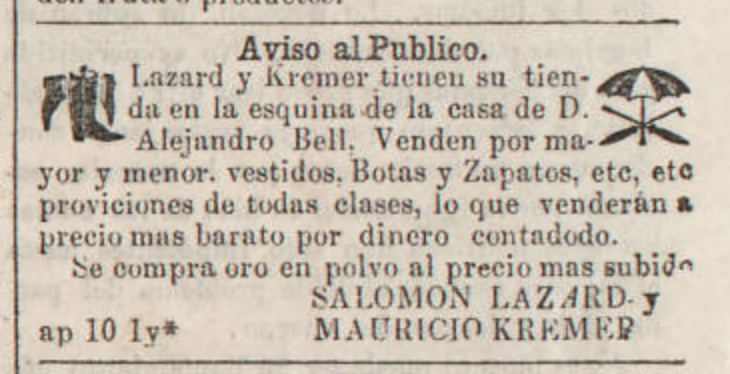
Ad (in Spanish) for Lazard and Kremer in the Los Angeles Star June 18, 1853

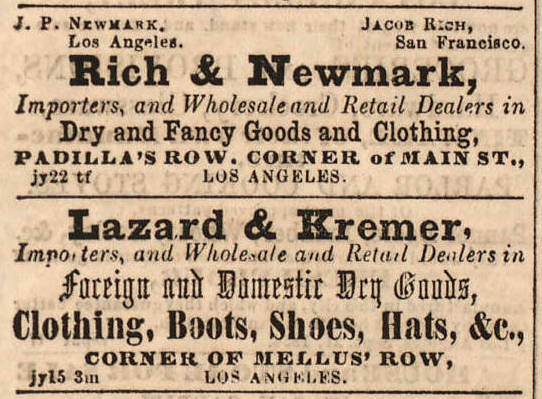
Ads for Rich and Newmark, and Lazard and Kremer in the Los Angeles Star September 21, 1854

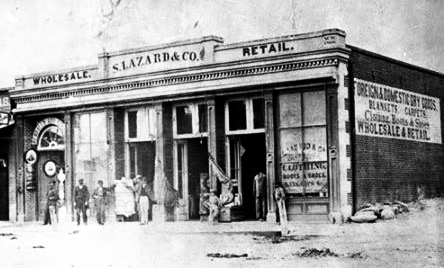
S. Lazard & Co.'s store on Main Street between 1866 and 1872

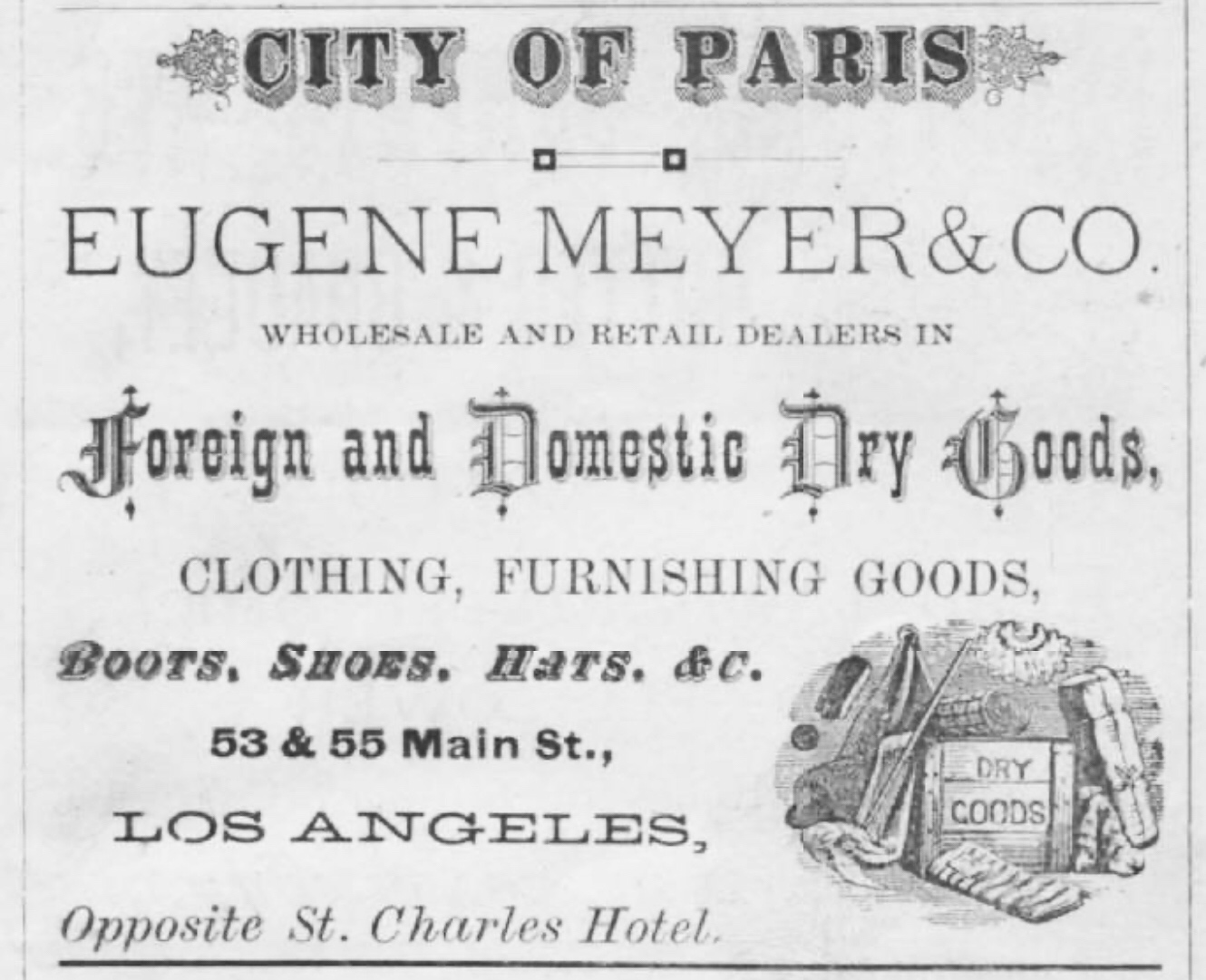
Eugene Meyer & Co. City of Paris Ad in Los Angeles city directory 1878

French immigrant Solomon Lazard and a cousin, Maurice Kremer, became partners and opened a dry goods store, Lazard & Kremer Co., in 1852 in a row of shops called Mellus Row, later called the Bell Block, or Bell's Row, on the southeast corner of Los Angeles Street at Aliso Street, until Kremer sold his share to Timoteo Wolfskill (1835–1909) to form Lazard & Wolfskill Co. on June 16, 1857. After Wolfskill withdrew from the partnership on August 13, 1858 the company became S. Lazard & Co.

In 1867 Lazard moved the business to 53 Main Street. It was a place where elegant Los Angeles women sought the latest thing in French fashion.

Strasbourg, Alsace-born Marc Eugene Meyer (father of financier Eugene Meyer who would own The Washington Post and be president of the World Bank and Federal Reserve) joined Constant Meyer and Nathan Cahn (or Kahn) to buy S. Lazard & Co. from Mr. Lazard in 1874, and from that point forward, operated as Eugene Meyer & Co. and named the store itself the City of Paris. As of March 1874, Eugene Meyer & Co. promoted themselves as "successors to S. Lazard & Co." doing business as the "City of Paris" store at 51-53 Main Street, and in the 1878 city directory at 53–55 Main Street "opposite the St. Charles Hotel", thus on the west side of the street near the St. Elmo Hotel.

In January 1879, Eugene Meyer's cousin, Leon (Leopold) Loeb, was added as a partner to Eugene Meyer & Co. Leon Loeb was the son-in-law of pioneer Harris Newmark (born in Löbau/Loebau, Prussia), and he was the father of Joseph P. Loeb.

October 2, 1880 Meyer's City of Paris opened in a new location; the entire building was known as the City of Paris Block, at 17–19 Spring Street. just south of First Street and the Nadeau Hotel which would be built in 1888.

In Spring 1883 the City of Paris moved to new premises at 105-107 North Spring Street (pre-1890 numbering; west side between Franklin Temple, just north of the Jones Block; post-1890 numbering: 205–207 North Spring Street).

In October 1883 the Meyers sold out, Marc Eugene Meyer moved to San Francisco, Emmanuel L. Stern was admitted as a partner, and the three partners formed Stern, Cahn & Loeb. The store continued to be known as "The City of Paris", in what was then the Central Business District.

The city renumbered buildings in 1890 and advertisements from 1892 show that the store was operating at the same location, but expanded by one shopfront on either side, at 203-209 North Spring Street. In 1893, the company was reported in financial trouble, and by that time was managed by the Stern Bros., who had taken over from Leon Loeb. By 1894, the store was advertising its closure.

However, the store was still operating in 1895 in the Jones Block at 177 North Spring Street, even as the better department stores were starting to move to South Broadway.

The store finally went bankrupt in 1897.
