= Loeb & Loeb =

American law firm

Loeb and Loeb LLP
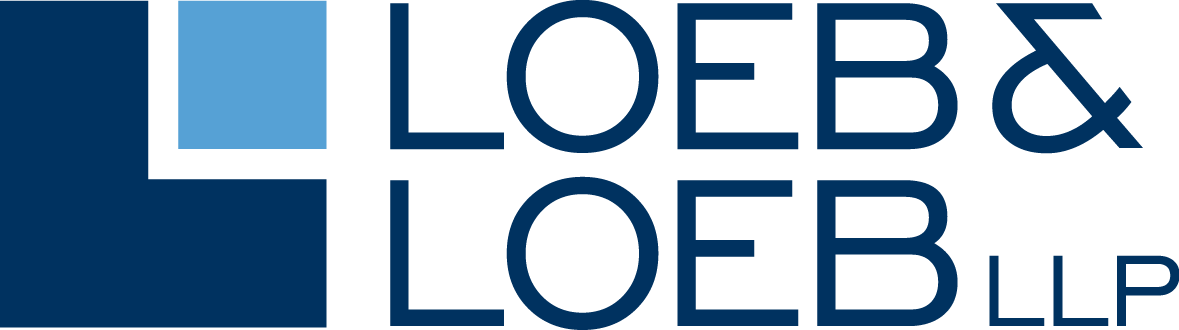
- Headquarters: Los Angeles, California
- No. of offices: 9
- Offices: United States, Asia
- No. of attorneys: 450
- Key people: Mitchell Nussbaum & Arash Khalili, co-chairs
- Date founded: 1909
- Founder: Joseph Loeb & Edwin Loeb
- Website: Loeb.com

Loeb & Loeb LLP is a multi-service law firm with nine offices across the United States and Asia. The firm has more than 450 lawyers worldwide and represents a range of organizations in addition to high-net-worth individuals and families.

Based on size and revenue, the firm ranks in the top 200 law firms in the United States according to The National Law Journal's 2023 NLJ 500 and The American Lawyer's 2023 Am Law 200 listings.

Loeb is recognized for its depth in practice areas including entertainment and media, technology, advertising, financial services, trusts and estates, and real estate. The firm handles a variety of transactional, counseling, and dispute-related practices.

== History ==
Loeb & Loeb was founded in Los Angeles in 1909, by brothers Edwin J. and Joseph P. Loeb. In 1910, the firm represented the Associated Jobbers of Los Angeles and the Pacific Coast Jobbers’ and Manufacturers’ Association in San Francisco in a rail transport dispute between the two cities before the Interstate Commerce Commission (ICC) on May 7 of that year, which resulted in a win. The court’s decision was subsequently reversed, and the case went before the U.S. Supreme Court. On June 8, 1914, the Supreme Court upheld the ICC’s judgment and abolished the “switching charge,” helping spur the growth of commerce between California’s two largest cities at the time and establishing the firm’s reputation.

The firm has deep roots in the entertainment industry. In the early 1920s, the firm played a significant role in the representation of major industry theater entrepreneur Marcus Loew. In 1924, Loeb & Loeb oversaw the transaction that led to Loew gaining control of Metro Pictures, Goldwyn Pictures, and Louis B. Mayer Pictures, ultimately resulting in the creation of Metro-Goldwyn-Mayer (MGM). Additionally, Edwin Loeb is credited as one of the founders of the Academy of Motion Picture Arts & Sciences (AMPAS).

The firm also played a role in the founding of local Los Angeles institutions UnionBank and Cedars-Sinai Medical Center. Its work on behalf of those clients, as well as of smaller enterprises looking to take advantage of opportunities in the rapidly expanding city, bolstered Loeb & Loeb’s reputation for representing innovators and entrepreneurs, a focus that continues today.

In 1986, the firm merged with Hess Segal in New York and began its steady expansion as a national, and later international, firm.

In 2025, Loeb & Loeb represented Alcon Media Group in a $417.5 million bid to acquire Village Roadshow Entertainment Group’s film library, defeated an effort to block the premiere of Ryan Kavanaugh’s film “Skill House” in a case brought by Curtis “50 Cent” Jackson and NYC Vibe LLC, and defended itself and former partner Allen Z. Sussman in a malicious prosecution lawsuit filed by a former Aluminaid general counsel.

== Recognition ==
=== Diversity recognition ===
- Diversity & Flexibility Alliance “Tipping the Scales” Toward Gender Parity 2023
- Leadership Council on Legal Diversity 2023 Top Performer
- Mansfield 6.0 Certification
- Lawyers of Color’s Aspire Diversity Award

=== Pro Bono recognition ===
- Northern District of Illinois' 2023 Excellence in Pro Bono and Public Interest Service Award.
- The Legal Aid Society's 2022 Pro Bono Publico Award.
- 2022 Capital Pro Bono Honor Roll.
- ACLU 2021 Community Service Award.

=== Awards ===
- Named “Law Firm of the Year” in the Entertainment Law – Music category (2024, 2022, 2021, 2020, 2017, 2015, 2013)
- Named “Law Firm of the Year” in Advertising by U.S. News and World Report – 2022
- Received Tier 1 rankings on 17 national lists and 46 regional “Best Law Firms” lists by U.S. News and World Report
- Ranked Number Four on Vault’s 2020 list of the “Best Law Firms for Entertainment, Media and Sports”
- Chambers USA Guide 2023: 16 firm rankings, 42 attorneys recognized
- Chambers High Net Worth Guide 2024: Eight firm rankings, 24 attorneys recognized
- Named “Law Firm of the Year” in Motion Picture & Television (2023. 2016, 2014, 2012, 2011)
- The Legal 500 United States 2023: 15 firm rankings, 74 lawyers recognized
- Chambers Global and Greater China Guides: 4 lawyers recognized

== Office locations ==
- Los Angeles
- New York
- Chicago
- Nashville
- Washington, D.C.
- San Francisco
- Beijing
- Hong Kong
- Tysons
