= Vera Nicolaevna Preobrajenska =

Russian-American composer (1926–2011)

Vera Nicolaevna Preobrajenska (27 Apr 1926 - 25 Jun 2011) was a Russian American arranger, composer, music educator, and writer. She composed in many genres, including ballet and opera.

Preobrajenska was born in San Francisco, California, to Tatiana N. Kasperovich and Nicholas A. Preobrajenska. She studied composition with Ernest Bloch, Ernest von Dohnanyi, Frederick Jacobi, Darius Milhaud, Dmitri Shostakovich, Roger Sessions, and Alexander Tcherepnin. Her educational background and job history included:

- [no date] AA from University of California, Berkeley
- 1950 piano debut
- 1953 BA San Francisco State University
- 1956-61 concert manager for Musical Artists of America
- 1964 musical stenographer at Berkeley Music Center Record Company
- 1964 arranged songs at Skye Music Services (Oakland, California)
- 1965-68 classroom pianist for ballet and modern dance at University of California Berkeley
- 1972 MA Bernadean University (a mail order/online school in Las Vegas, Nevada)
- 1972-74 chaired the music department at Bernadean University
- 1973 PHD Bernadean University
- 1974-75 honorary director of music at Santa Cruz Academy of Music

The National League of American Pen Women awarded Preobrajenska two composition prizes. Her papers are archived at the University of Wyoming. Her music was published by the American Music Center and Belwin (today part of Alfred Music).

== Works ==
Her works include:

=== Ballets ===
- Clara Militch (piano)
- Hebraic Rhapsody (string orchestra)

=== Band music ===
- Mazurka
- Patriotic March: Spirit of 1976

=== Chamber music ===
- Clarinet Quintet
- Piano Quintet
- Rondino (guitar)
- Sonata in Three Movements (flute)
- String Quartets (three)

=== Operas ===
- The Money Lender

=== Orchestral music ===
- Blue Symphony
- Third Symphony

=== Organ music ===
- Fugue in a minor
- Preludium

=== Piano music ===
- Etudes I, II, and III
- Sonata

=== Prose ===
- poems in Ram Magazine
- Song Writers Course, Parts I and II

=== Vocal music ===
- Cycle of English Art Songs
- Cycle of Russian Art Songs
- Easter Prayer (mixed chorus)
- Hebraic Cantata (mixed chorus and chamber orchestra)
- Ode to Lincoln’s Gettysburg Address
