= Solomon Lazard =

American politician

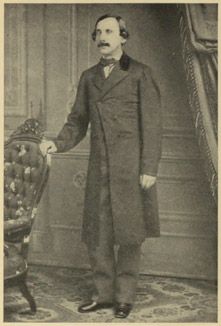
- Born: 1827; Lorraine, France
- Died: 1916 (age 89); Los Angeles, California
- Occupation: Businessman
- Known for: Founder of Lazard Frères and Company
- Spouse: Carolyn Newmark
- Children: 6
- Family: Joseph Newmark (father-in-law); Simon Lazard (cousin); Maurice Kremer (cousin)

Solomon Lazard, also known as S. Lazard, (1827–1916) was an entrepreneur in 19th century Los Angeles, California, a member of the city council there in 1854, and founder of S. Lazard & Co (later the City of Paris department store).

== Biography ==
Lazard was born in Fromberg, France on April 5, 1827. He married Carrie or Carolyn Newmark, the daughter of Joseph Newmark, on July 5, 1865. They had three boys and three girls, including sons E.M. Lazard and Sylvan A. Lazard and daughters who married Louis Levin and Abraham Jacoby, co-founder of the Jacoby Brothers department store in San Francisco.

In Los Angeles, as a mark of respect he was known as Don Solomon, "and being popular, he frequently acted as floor manager at balls and fandangos."

Lazard arrived in the United States in 1844 or 1850 and became a U.S. citizen about 1853, but In 1861 he visited France and was arrested on the charge that he still owed military duty to that country, where he had been born. He served six days in prison and then hired a substitute to take his place.

Lazard died on January 13, 1916, leaving his wife, two sons and a daughter. A funeral service was held in the family home at 657 Westlake Avenue in the Echo Park district, with interment following at Home of Peace Cemetery (East Los Angeles).

== Career ==
=== Dry goods ===
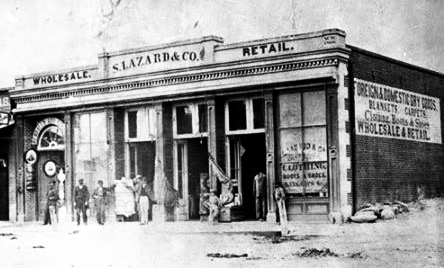
S. Lazard & Co.'s store on Main St. between 1866 and 1872

Lazard sailed from Europe to New York City in 1844, and then to San Francisco in 1851. He remained there about a year until he went to San Diego, where he intended to engage in the dry goods business. but, finding the town too small for his success, he set up shop in Los Angeles instead, on Aliso Street, a main road to and from such places as San Gabriel, El Monte and San Bernardino. He and a cousin, Maurice Kremer, partnered and formed Lazard & Kremer Co, a dry goods store located in a row of shops called Mellus Row, later called the Bell Block, or Bell's Row, on the southeast corner of Los Angeles Street, until Kremer sold his share to Timoteo Wolfskill to form Lazard & Wolfskill Co. on June 16, 1857. After Wolfskill withdrew from the partnership on August 13, 1858 the company became S. Lazard & Co. In 1867 Lazard moved the business to 53 Main Street, where he named the store as The City of Paris. This was where elegant Los Angeles women sought the latest thing in French fashion. Lazard sold the company in 1874 to Marc Eugene Meyer and it was thenceforth known as Eugene Meyer & Co.

=== Water ===
In 1868, the City Council relinquished its rights to the water in the Los Angeles River in favor of businessmen Lazard, John S. Griffen and Prudent Beaudry, and the three created the Los Angeles City Water Company. The contract lapsed in 1898.

=== Banking ===
Although the international banking firm of Lazard Frères and Company has stated it was founded in 1848 by his cousins, brothers Alexandre, Lazare, and Simon Lazard, in New Orleans, Louisiana, and after joined by brothers Maurice and Elie Lazard moved to San Francisco in 1851, other sources give the following story:

As there was no bank in Los Angeles in the mid-19th century, the residents either kept their money at home or confided it to the Catholic nuns in a convent at Alameda Street and Macy Street. When Eugène Isaac Meyer joined him in Los Angeles in 1859, Solomon followed the example of his brothers who were directing financial houses in Paris and Strasbourg: He opened a deposit window in his store under the name of Lazard et Frères, "a private banking firm that still exists, with branches around the world."

== Public service ==
Lazard was a member of the Los Angeles Common Council in 1854 and again in 1861–62, and in 1873 he was the first president of the Los Angeles Chamber of Commerce.

== Book cited ==
- Kahrl, William L. (1982). Water and Power: The Conflict over Los Angeles' Water Supply in the Owens Valley. Berkeley: University of California Press. ISBN 0-520-04431-2.
