= Joseph Brandenstein =

German-born American businessman

- Born: 1826; Hümme, Germany
- Died: 1910 (age 84); San Francisco, California
- Occupation: Businessman
- Spouse: Jane Rosenbaum
- Children: 11 including Max J. Brandenstein
- Family: Frederick Jacobi Jr. (grandson)

Joseph Brandenstein (1826–1910) was a German-born American businessman and philanthropist.

== Biography ==
Brandenstein was born to a Jewish family in 1826 in Hümme, Germany. In 1850, he immigrated to California and settled in Placerville, California. He first tried his luck at mining for gold but failed. In 1852, he moved to San Francisco where he partnered with Joseph P. Newmark and founded a dry goods store. In 1854, Newmark moved to Los Angeles and Brandenstein then partnered with brothers Albert and Moses Rosenbaum and founded a wholesale leaf tobacco and cigar business. Their company stocked large amounts of tobacco and during the American Civil War benefited greatly when shortages developed. He retired in 1880.

Brandenstein was president of the German Benevolent Society, the founder and president of the German senior citizen's home Alennheim, served on the board of the Pacific Hebrew Orphan Asylum, and served as president of the Mt. Zion Hospital Association. He was an active member of the Eureka Benevolent Society and Congregation Emanu-El.

== Personal life ==
Brandenstein married Jane Rosenbaum, the sister of his partners in the tobacco business; they had eleven children of which 10 survived him: Max Joseph Brandenstein, Manfred Brandenstein, Henry U. Brandenstein., Edward Brandenstein, Charles Brandenstein, Flora Brandenstein Jacobi (married to wholesale wine merchant Frederick Jacobi Sr. and mother of composer Frederick Jacobi Jr.), Edith Brandenstein Jacobi (married to Jacob Jackson "J.J." Jacobi), Mrs. William Greenbaum, and Agnes Brandenstein Silverberg (married to Joseph S. Silverberg). Their son Max, who founded MJB Coffee and was joined by his brothers Manfred, Charles, and Edward.
