= Maurice Kremer =

American businessman and civil servant

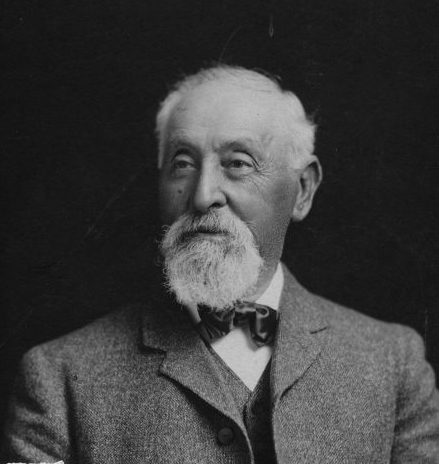
- Born: Maurice Kremer; January 18, 1824; Lorraine, France
- Died: March 7, 1907 (age 83)
- Occupation: Businessman
- Spouse: Matilda Newmark
- Family: Joseph Newmark (father-in-law); Solomon Lazard (cousin); Simon Lazard (cousin)

Maurice Kremer (1824–1907) was an American businessman and civil servant.

== Biography ==
Kremer, who was Jewish, was born in Lorraine, France on January 18, 1824. He immigrated to the United States first to Memphis, Tennessee, then followed the California gold rush west across the Isthmus of Panama to the Pacific coast. He worked briefly with his cousins, Elie and Simon Lazard of Lazard Freres, in Sacramento and San Francisco before moving to Los Angeles in 1852. In the same year, he opened a dry goods store, Lazard & Kremer Company, with his cousin and brother-in-law Solomon Lazard (Lazard and Kremer both married daughters of Joseph Newmark). In 1856, they formed Newmark, Kremer & Co. with his father-in-law, Joseph Newmark, and Newmark's nephews, Joseph P. Newmark and Harris Newmark.

Kremer along with fellow Jewish immigrants Harris Newmark, Solomon Lazard, Jacob Baruch, and Herman Haas who, like Kremer, founded large wholesale enterprises in Bell's Row, at that time considered the best business location in the city, and Isaias W. Hellman (who founded Los Angeles' first bank), used their proceeds to purchase and develop housing. Together they all served on the Los Angeles City Council since its inception in 1850, and used their wealth to fund the streetcar system, the power distribution network, and the water distribution network. They also founded the city's first synagogue, its first fraternal organization, and in 1854, the Hebrew Benevolent Society.

He served in various positions with the city of Los Angeles: Treasurer of Los Angeles (1860–1865); Los Angeles School Board (1866–1874); City Clerk of Los Angeles (1875–1876); Tax Collector of Los Angeles (1876–1879); and Chief Tax Collector of Los Angeles (1880). Kremer later opened a fruit shipping company M. Kremer & Co. and a fire insurance company which he operated until his death on March 7, 1907.

== Personal life ==
In 1856, he married Matilda Newmark, the daughter of Joseph Newmark. His wife served as a founder of the Ladies Benevolent Society of Los Angeles. They had 12 children of which only 6 survived infancy: daughters Rachel Kremer Lazarus (1858–1935), Emily Kremer Germain (1864–1951), Eda Kremer Hellman (1870–1912), and Agnes Kremer Hellman (1870–1964)(Agnes married her predeceased sister Eda's husband, James W. Hellman, 1861–1940, the brother of Isaias W. Hellman and Herman W. Hellman); and sons Fred Kremer and Abraham Kremer.

The Kremers were founding members of Congregation B'nai B'rith (now Wilshire Boulevard Temple). In 1859, he founded Turnverein and in 1860, he was co-founder of the French Benevolent Society. In 1880, he was named a Trustee of the Hebrew Benevolent Society of Los Angeles.

Kremer spoke English, Spanish, French, and German.
