= Alexander Bell (California merchant) =

American politician

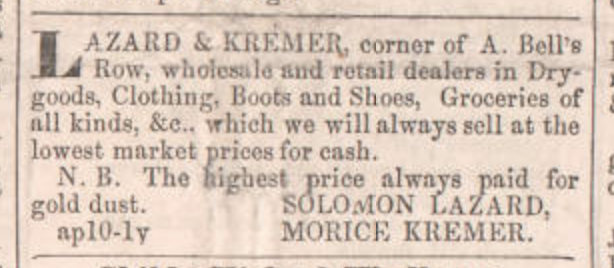
Ad for Lazard and Kremer store in Bell’s Block in Los Angeles Star October 30, 1852

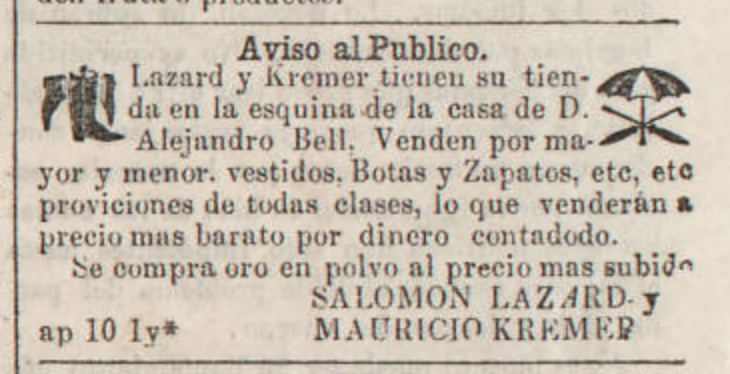
Ad (in Spanish) for Lazard and Kremer store in Bell’s Block in Los Angeles Star June 18, 1853

Alexander Bell (1801–1871) was a Los Angeles merchant both before and after that city became a part of the United States. He was elected to the first Los Angeles Common Council, the city's governing body, on July 1, 1850, but resigned on September 26 of that year.

Bell was born in Washington County, Pennsylvania, on January 9, 1801, and in 1823 he emigrated to Mexico, where he lived until he came to Los Angeles in 1842. Two years later, he married Maria de las Nieves Guirado Botello.

Bell took an active part in the Californians' revolution against Manuel Micheltorena in 1844. He was also a captain in the California Battalion during the Mexican–American War.

In 1845, he built the Bell Block on the southeast corner of Aliso and Los Angeles streets. It was also known as the Mellus Row and was for many years a notable landmark, where John C. Fremont established his headquarters when he was governor of the territory in 1847. Bell also built a warehouse in San Pedro.

Bell died in Los Angeles, on July 24, 1871.
