= Jones Block (Los Angeles) =

Demolished commercial building in Downtown Los Angeles

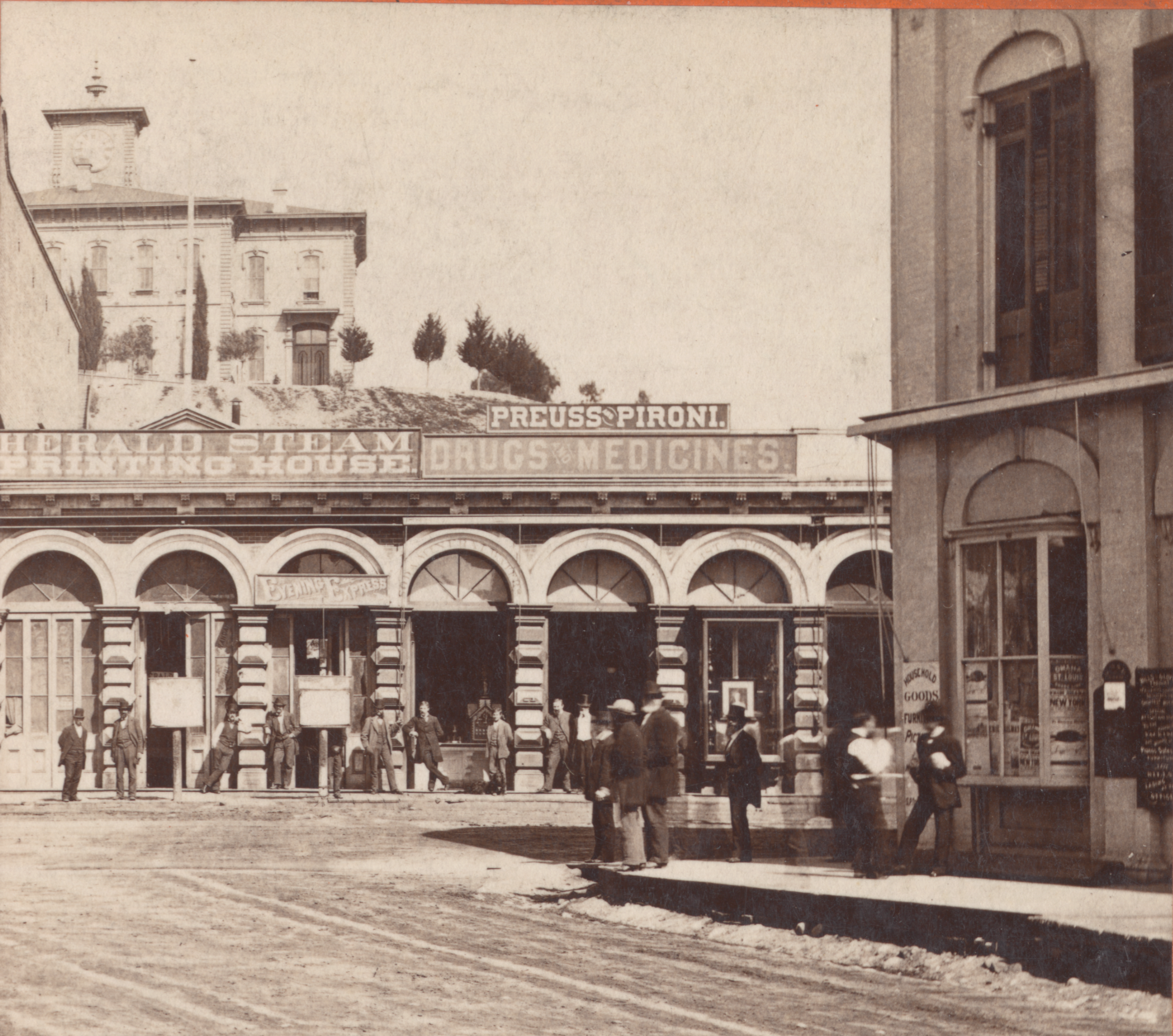
Jones Block when it was a single story c.1880-1882. Los Angeles High School on Pound Cake Hill at back.

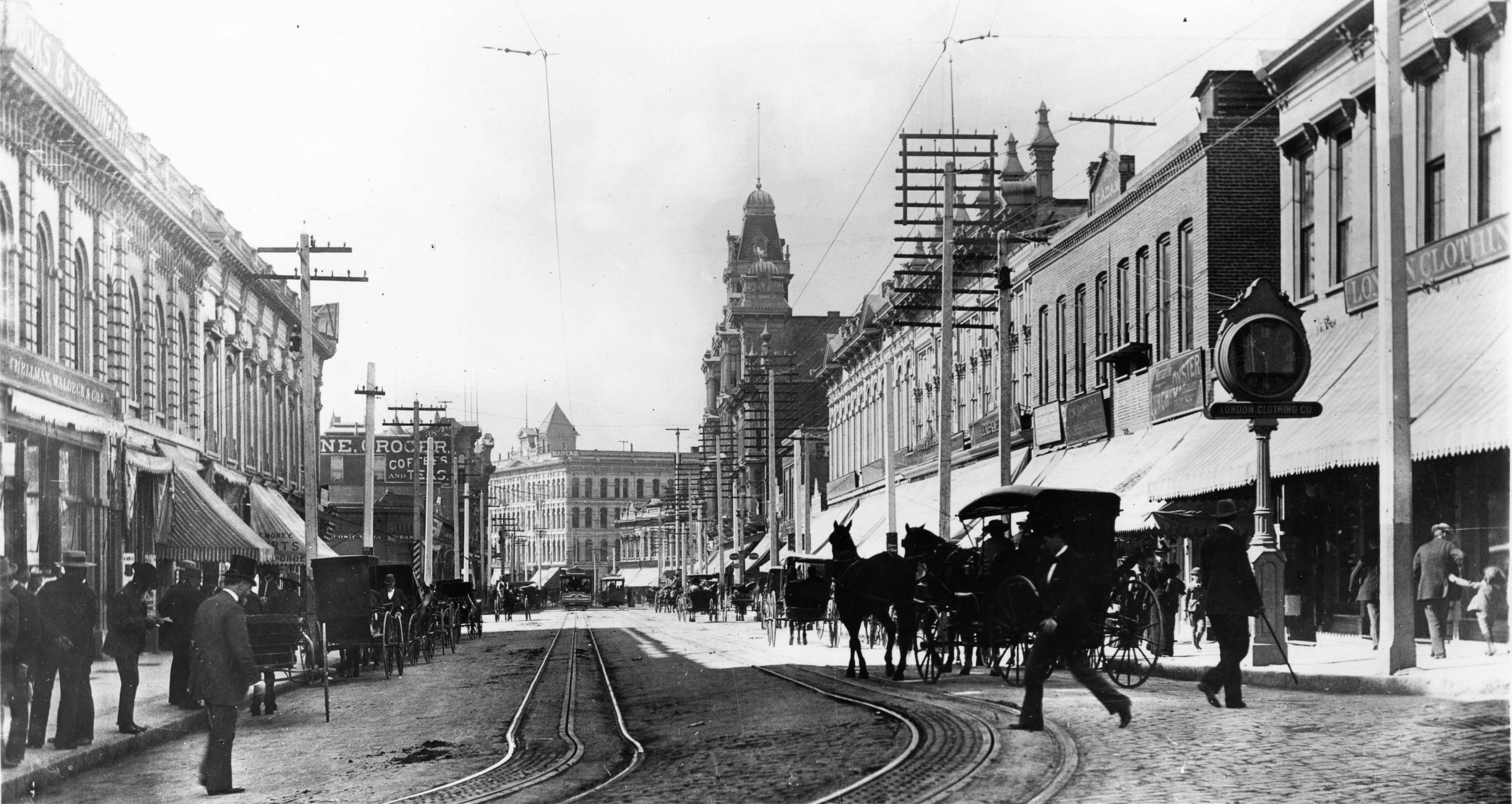
View south on Spring St. from Temple, c.1883–1894. The towers in the background are the Phillips Block; the two larger buildings to its right are the Jones Block and (with turrets) City of Paris. Far right: Allen Block and Harris & Frank's London Clothing Co., with its landmark clock.

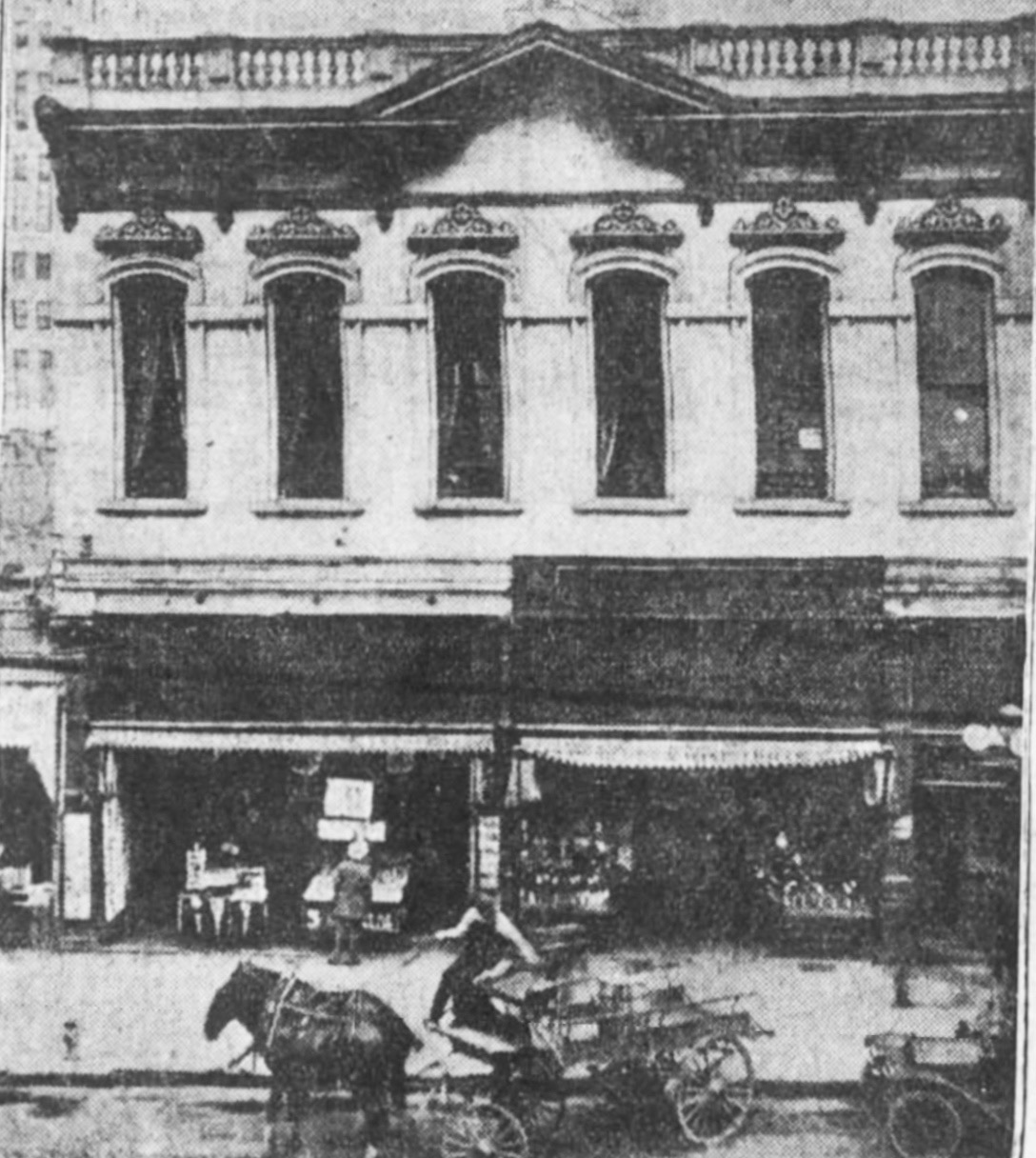
Jones Block sometime between 1886–1895 when home to J. W. Robinson's Boston Dry Goods store.

The Jones Block was an important early commercial and retail building in the Victorian Downtown Los Angeles on the west side of Spring Street just south of Temple Street, which stood from the 1870s through the 1920s.

The original single-story building was the location of the Herald newspaper's office as early as 1875. A second story was built in 1882 or -3. It was demolished in the 1920s to create the City Hall block.

== Location ==
According to the pre-1890 numbering scheme, the Jones Block, although one building complex, had various discontinguous numbers for its various spaces: 71–73, 77–79, and 101–103 N. Spring Street.

According to the post-1890 numbering scheme which added 100 to the previous building numbers in order to start with the number 100 at First Street, the Jones Block was located at 171–179 and 201 N. Spring Street.

== Tenants ==
Tenants included:

- The Preuss & Pironi drugstore which advertised here at #77–79 (pre-1890s numbering) in 1884 and 1885
- The Los Angeles Herald offices steam printing plant, from 1875 or earlier, through 1888
- Mr. J. W. Robinson's Boston Dry Goods store at #171–173 (post-1890 numbering), from 1886 to 1895. J. W. Robinson's would become a major regional department store chain across Southern California and other states.
- The City of Paris department store at number 177 (post-1890 numbering) during its final few years of operation, c.1895–1897.
