= Harris Newmark =

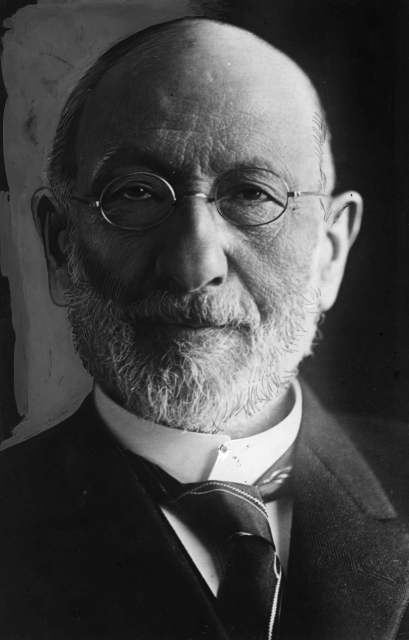
- Born: July 5, 1834; Löbau, Kingdom of Prussia (now Lubawa, Poland)
- Died: 1916 (aged 81–82)
- Occupations: Businessman philanthropist
- Spouse(s): Sarah Newmark (cousin and wife)
- Children: Maurice Harris Newmark
- Parent(s): Phillip Newmark; Esther Newmark
- Relatives: Joseph P. Newmark (brother); Nathan Newmark (brother); Joseph Newmark (uncle and father-in-law); Leon Loeb (son-in-law); Joseph P. Loeb (grandson)

Harris Newmark (July 5, 1834 – 1916) was a Jewish American businessman, philanthropist, and historian. Newmark immigrated to the United States in 1853. He sailed from Europe to New York City, and then to San Francisco. He joined his older brother and other family in Los Angeles. His branch of the family were among the founders and developers of the region, founding Montebello, California and the related area.

Newmark contributed to developing many local institutions, such as the Los Angeles County Library and others supporting children's welfare. He wrote a memoir, Sixty Years in Southern California: 1853–1913, which has been cited in dozens of academic papers and books. It is described as the Los Angeles equivalent of a Pepys diary.

== Early years ==
Newmark was born in Löbau in the Prussian Partition of Poland (now Lubawa, Poland). He was the son of Jewish parents Phillip and Esther Newmark. Among his siblings was an older brother Joseph P. Newmark. Their father Phillip Newmark was born in Neumark (now Nowe Miasto Lubawskie, Poland). He frequently traveled to Sweden and Denmark to sell his ink and blackening products. He made a sales trip to New York City in 1837, but became ill and returned home in 1838.

Joseph P. Newmark emigrated to California in 1848, and beckoned his brother Harris to follow. Many Newmark relatives had already settled there. Newmark sailed for New York City. He boarded a second ship for California, crossed the isthmus of Nicaragua with Leopold Harris, who would found the Harris & Frank department stores, and arrived in San Francisco in October 1853, at the age of 19. After he reached Los Angeles, his first American job was serving as a clerk for his brother Joseph at his partnership Rich & Newmark, a dry goods emporium.

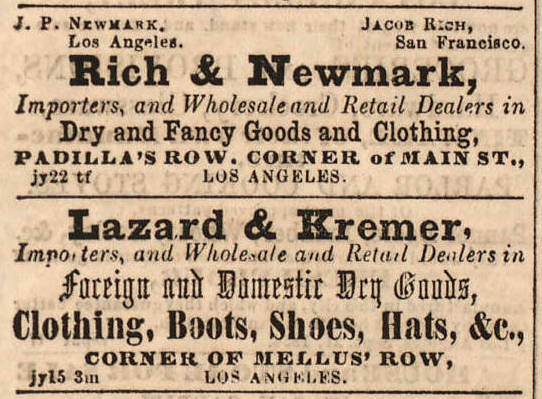
Ads for two early dry goods stores in the Los Angeles Star, September 21, 1854. The Lazard & Kremer store developed as the "City of Paris" department store.

At the time, Newmark had limited English-language skills; he spoke German, Swedish, and had picked up some Spanish while en route to and in California.

In 1854, their uncle Joseph Newmark arrived in Los Angeles with his wife and six children. Newmark lived with them for a time, and his aunt taught the young man how to read, write, and spell in English. On March 24, 1858, Newmark married his cousin Sarah in the family home. Her father, his uncle Joseph officiated, and became Harris' father-in-law.

== Businessman ==
Newmark developed several successful businesses, which employed most if not all of a near-inexhaustible list of Newmark family members. Newmark was chiefly a grocer and dry goods merchant, but he also dabbled in other fields. He even tried sheep farming. He was primarily focused on the burgeoning real estate opportunities to be had in the Los Angeles area. Newmark bought and sold properties throughout southern California, and made a fortune in the process.

As noted, he first clerked for his brother Joseph P. at Rich & Newmark. In 1854, he opened a clothing store on the south side of Commercial Street and east of Main Street, in what had been the Prudent Beaudry building owned by Mateo Keller. For eight years he had several partners in this venture. In 1862, Newmark went into the commission business instead.

At the end of 1885, Newmark retired from the grocery business to devote more time to his real estate and investment pursuits. In 1886, he and four other businessmen: his nephew Kaspare Cohn, John D. Bicknell, Stephen M. White, and I.W. Hellman—purchased a 5,000-acre (20 km^{2}) ranch located in East Los Angeles called Rancho Repetto. The land had been owned by an Italian settler named Alessandro Repetto, who had bequeathed the ranch to his brother Antonio. Newmark's group bought the inheritance for US$60,000, or about $12 per acre.

In May 1899, Newmark subdivided the tract owned by him and his nephew, after contracting with William Mulholland to design and construct a suitable water system for the new settlement. Accounts differ as to the actual size of Newmark and Cohn's parcel, but it was somewhere around 1,200 to 1,500 acres (6.1 km^{2}).

A piece of this tract, adjacent to the tracks of the San Pedro, Los Angeles & Salt Lake Railroad, was developed into a town site called Newmark. The remaining land was subdivided into 5-acre (2.0 ha) lots suitable for small-scale agriculture. The entire settlement, including the Newmark town site, was given the name Montebello. When the town incorporated in 1920, it renamed the city as Montebello.

== Personal life ==
On March 24, 1858, Newmark was married to his cousin Sarah Newmark by her father Joseph Newmark, Los Angeles first lay rabbi. Five of their eleven children survived infancy: Maurice Harris Newmark (c. 1859–1929) married his cousin, Rose Newmark in 1888; Marco Ross Newmark (born c. 1878); Ella Newmark Seligman (married Carl Seligman), Emily Newmark Loew (married to Jacob Loew), and Estelle Newmark Loeb (married to Leon Loeb).

== Legacy ==
Newmark made many contributions to the economy and culture of Los Angeles; he gave both his time and money to a variety of causes. He was one of the founders of the Los Angeles Public Library, was a charter member of the Los Angeles Chamber of Commerce, and was one of the organizers of the Board of Trade, which helped bring railroad service to California.

He was active in the Jewish community, serving as president of Congregation B'nai B'rith in 1887 (he inherited the title from his uncle and father-in-law Joseph Newmark) and a founder of the Jewish Orphans Home of Southern California. Newmark helped establish the Southwest Museum, which is now part of the Autry National Center. He and other Newmarks were leaders of the local Odd Fellows and were also Masons.

Newmark's memoir, Sixty Years in Southern California, was assembled with the assistance of his sons and a Pasadena historian. It has been called "one of the great autobiographies" by an American Jewish writer, and "the single most valuable memoir" about southern California in the nineteenth century. The American Memory project of the Library of Congress has the entire memoir available online.

Harris Newmark High School, a continuation high school in the Los Angeles Unified School District is named in his honor, as is the Harris Newmark Building in downtown Los Angeles. Now called the New Mart building, the edifice was the first high-rise structure in the city, and was built in 1928 by Newmark's sons. [[The Braly Block at Second and Springs streets was the city's first highrise, circa 1904. Between then and the late 1950s, the only higher building that was allowed constructed was city hall. The city council imposed a height limit of 150 feet at the height of the city beautiful movement]]

Newmark was the grandfather of Los Angeles lawyer Joseph P. Loeb, who also proofread his memoir book.
