= Joseph P. Newmark =

- Born: Löbau, West Prussia, Prussia (now Lubawa, Poland)
- Family: Harris Newmark (brother); Joseph Newmark (uncle)

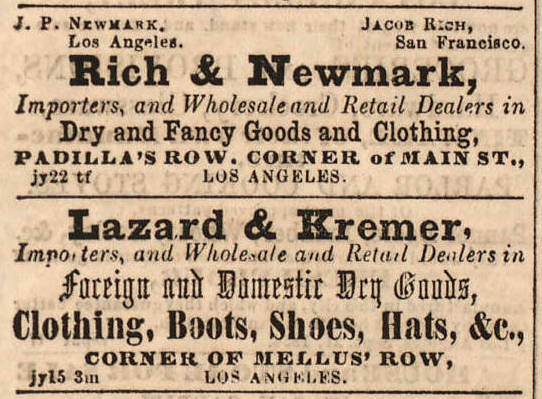
Ads for Rich & Newmark, and Lazard and Kremer in the Los Angeles Daily Star 1854-09-21

Joseph P. Newmark (born c. 1827) was a Prussian-American businessman who helped develop the Los Angeles, California, area and a member of the Newmark family. There he founded the Rich & Newmark clothing store with Jacob Rich. He later founded Newmark, Kremer & Co., a wholesale-retail dry goods store, with other family members.

He was born in Löbau, West Prussia, Prussia (now Lubawa, Poland). He immigrated to the United States in 1848, settling in Los Angeles by 1852. He invited his younger brother Harris to immigrate and join his business. Others participating in the next dry goods store, noted above, included their uncle Joseph Newmark, and Maurice Kremer. Harris soon left to develop his own businesses in the region.

Newmark also left the partnership and moved to San Francisco, where he became a merchandise broker. After he retired in 1888, he returned to Los Angeles.
