= Los Angeles Area Chamber of Commerce =

Not-for-profit business federation

- Founded: 1888
- Purpose: Business advocacy & federation
- Location(s): 350 S. Bixel Street; Los Angeles, California
- Region served: (California) Los Angeles Area
- Key people: Maria S. Salinas, President & CEO
- Employees: 50

The Los Angeles Area Chamber of Commerce is Southern California's largest not-for-profit business federation, representing the interests of more than 235,000 businesses in L.A. County, more than 1,400 member companies and more than 722,430 employees.

== History ==
The L.A. Area Chamber's early focus promoted the region's abundance of opportunities in agriculture and international trade. These early members successfully advocated for a deep water port and secured water resources for the city. As Los Angeles matured into a major metropolitan center, the Chamber transitioned its focus into civic and political activities. These activities include International Trade, Education, Environment, Transportation, Advocacy, and Arts and Culture. The Chamber has demonstrated a long-standing leadership role in the Los Angeles community on these issues.

== Early history ==
Los Angeles experienced dramatic population losses during the late 1880s. 1,000 people each month left the city, which caused the cities population to fall from an 1880 high of 70,000 to nearly 50,000. This exodus generated significant effects on the local economy, and there was sudden realization of the need for an effective agency to dismiss doubts and reinvigorate the courage of the citizens. On October 10, 1888, a group of men joined together to formulate plans for overcoming the reverses the city had suffered. The founding officers of the new Chamber of Commerce were business leaders Maj. Edward W. Jones, William W. Workman, Col. Harrison G. Otis, Samuel B. Lewis, J.I. Redick and Thomas A. Lewis.

Early Chamber members formulated two objectives: stimulate migration and to market the area's products in other parts of the country. They decided to attract Midwestern farmers to Los Angeles because of their proven agricultural expertise. The Chamber undertook an ambitious expedition called “California on Wheels.” A railroad car outfitted with agricultural products of the state visited every town of importance in the Midwest and South. During its two-year tour, over a million passed through the exhibit doors and took home materials created by the chamber.

Frank Wiggins, the superintendent of events, conceived of the idea and pushed to feature California agricultural products at large national and international exhibitions; attracting nationwide fame to Los Angeles. Wiggins conceived of larger than life sized walnut elephant for the 1893 Chicago World's Fair. 850 pounds of unusually large California walnuts covered a wire framework to create the animal. It achieved lasting fame for the city and the Chamber. Displays like the elephant demonstrated that Southern California offered more than climate, but that it produced a variety of marketable items.

In addition to exhibitions, the Chamber encouraged grass roots investments in several manufacturing enterprises. Beet sugar manufacture benefited from technological advancements that encouraged its growth. By the end of the 20th century local factories produced 15,000 tons of sugar per year valued at $1,300,000. These industries received a boost with the discovery of oil and the introduction of electric power generated from water. The chamber attracted aircraft manufacturing in 1920 through its support of international air meets at Dominguez field and communication of meteorological information that made flights safer for pilots. The local livestock market received a boost when the Chamber collaborated with Chicago entrepreneurs in 1921 to create an area called the Central Manufacturing District and Los Angeles Junction Railway.

After World War II, the Chamber transitioned from organization that sought to attract new business to Los Angeles County into one that now worked to address modern issues associated with a major metropolitan center. The organization converted from a county-sponsored organization to a private business organization funded solely by its members. Its advocacy efforts started to include issues that also affected the four other surrounding counties. In 1967, the Chamber changed its name to the Los Angeles Area Chamber of Commerce.

== Advocacy ==
The Los Angeles Area Chamber of Commerce takes up key issues that affect the business community in Los Angeles. These issues include affordable Health Care, Affordable Housing, Disaster Preparedness, Economic Development, Education & Workforce Development, Homeland Security, Improving L.A.'s Business Climate, Industrial Land Use, LAX Modernization, and Reducing Traffic Congestion. Despite a business exodus from Downtown Los Angeles since the COVID-19 pandemic, the city's urban core is evolving as a cultural center with the world's largest showcase of architecture designed by Frank Gehry.

=== Access advocacy series ===
Each year, the L.A. Area Chamber's Access advocacy series connects L.A. businesses with policymakers and elected officials at the local, state and federal levels. The Chamber's advocacy trips to the state's and nation's capitols date back to the 1890s when the organization led delegations to secure regulatory approval and funding to construct the L.A. Aqueduct and L.A. Harbor.

== Programs and alliances ==
=== Mobility 21 ===
Mobility 21 is a regional effort involving five counties dedicated to the development of solutions to the transportation issues facing Southern California. Mobility 21 was created in 2002 to bring together elected officials, transportation providers, businesses, local municipalities, labor and community leaders to develop solutions to the transportation issues facing Los Angeles County. This initiative, led by the Los Angeles Area Chamber of Commerce and the Los Angeles County Metropolitan Transportation Authority (Metro) in partnership with the Automobile Club of Southern California, was kicked off at the first Mobility 21 transportation summit on November 18, 2002.

=== Southern California Leadership Network ===
In 2007, the Leadership L.A. Foundation and the Southern California Leadership Network merged and continued its partnership with the L.A. Area Chamber.

== See also ==
- US Chamber of Commerce
- Manhattan Chamber of Commerce
- J.S. Slauson, former chamber president
