= Harris & Jacoby =

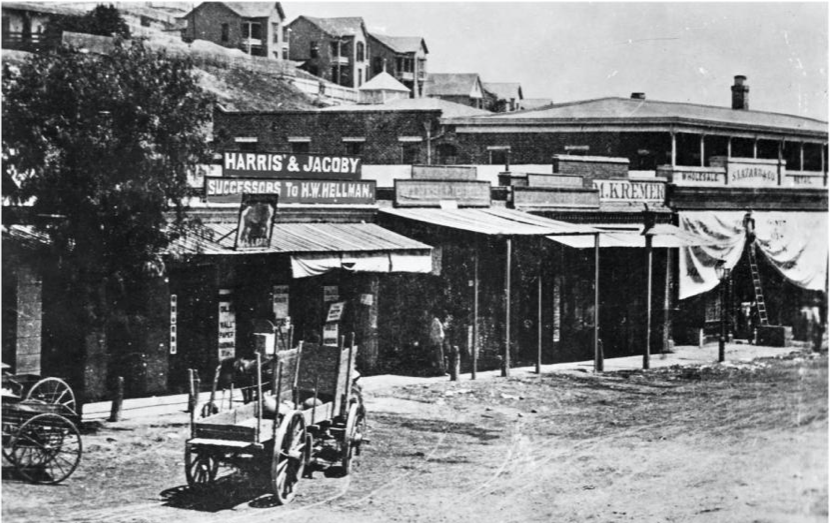
"Harris & Jacoby, successors to H. W. Hellman", and forerunners to both Harris & Frank and Jacoby Bros., in the Old Downey Block around 1870. The sign for M. Kremer is also visible, forerunner of the City of Paris department store

Harris & Jacoby was a retail enterprise of Leopold Harris and the Jacoby Bros. in the 1870s in Los Angeles. For further information, see:

- Leopold Harris
- Jacoby Bros.
