= Moreno Valley Mall =

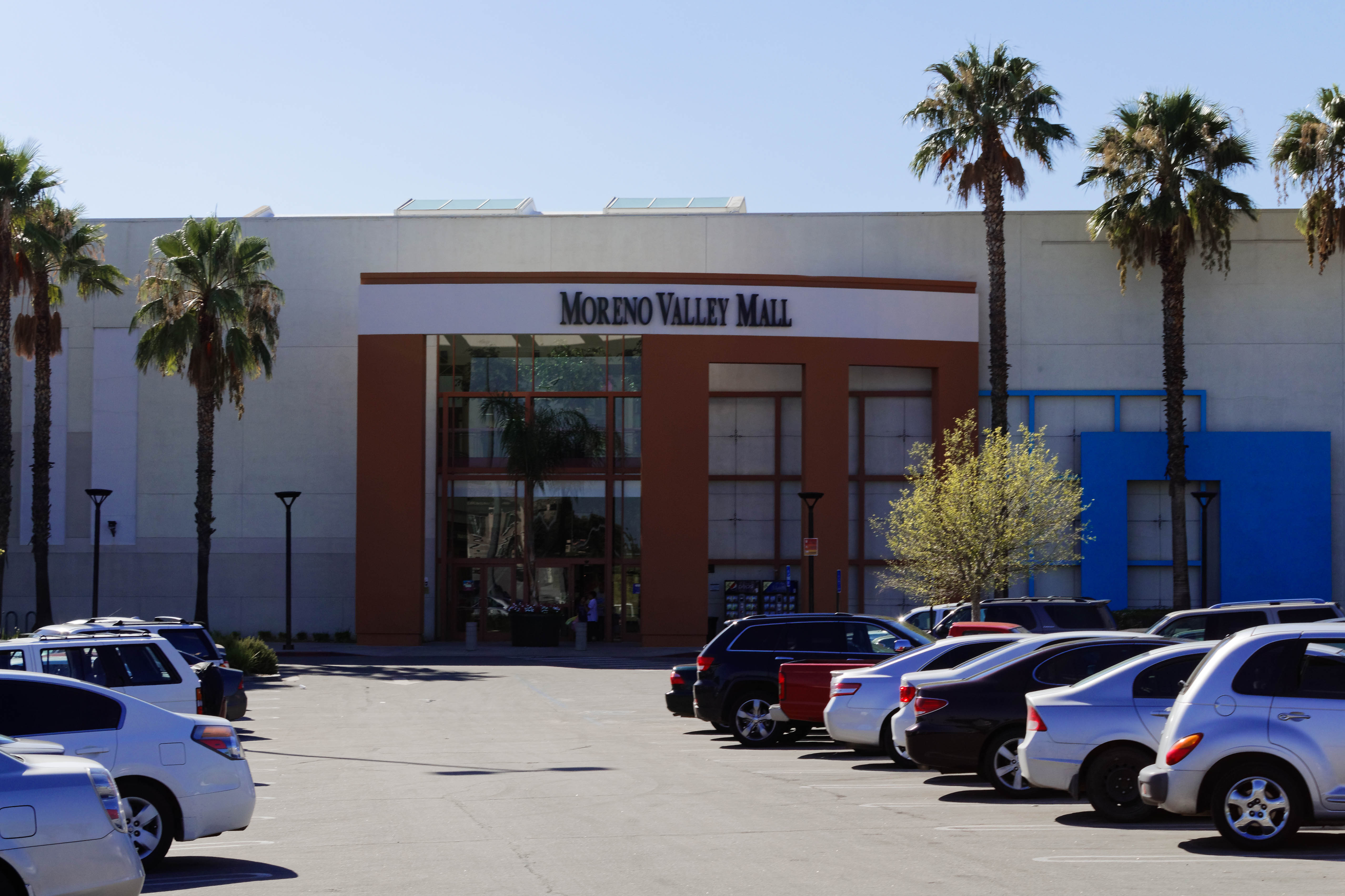
- Location: Moreno Valley, California, United States
- Coordinates: 33.93881°N 117.27109°W
- Address: 22500 Town Circle, Suite 1206
- Opened: 1992
- Developer: Homart Development Company
- Owner: International Growth Properties
- Num. of stores: 133
- Num. of anchor tenants: 7 (6 open, 1 vacant, 1 under construction)
- Floor area: 1,090,000 sq ft (101,000 m^{2})
- Floors: 2
- Parking: 6,500
- Website: morenovalleymall.com

The Moreno Valley Mall at Towngate is a shopping mall located on the former site of the Riverside International Raceway in Moreno Valley, California.

Developed by Homart Development Company, the initial anchor stores in 1992 were Sears, J. C. Penney, May Company California, and Harris Department Stores and had 140 specialty stores.

In the early years competition for tenants divided prospects between competing developers. In September 1996 the City confirmed that lower than anticipated revenues would result in a shortfall estimated to extend the payback period of the $13 million infrastructure loan to an estimated 2026 with the loan peaking at $19.5 million. Also, the mall was then valued at $66 million, far less than its original valuation of $107 million.

Moreno Valley Mall directly contracts with the local Police Service as well as private security firm for security services.

In 2015, Sears Holdings spun off 235 of its properties, including the Sears at Moreno Valley Mall, into Seritage Growth Properties.

International Growth Properties purchased Moreno Valley Mall in November 2017 for $63 million.

On November 7, 2019, it was announced that Sears would be closing this location a part of a plan to close 96 stores nationwide. The store closed on February 2, 2020.

In the 2020s, Your Furniture Place, a furniture was open on the lower level of the former anchor Sears. It closed a few years later.

In 2025, Sky Zone, a trampoline park, announced that it would be opening a location on the upper level of the former Sears anchor. Sky Zone is expected to open in 2026. This is part of Sky Zone’s expansion across the United States from the success of their trampoline parks. Sky Zone began construction on their trampoline park in 2025 and the new trampoline park was completed and held a soft opening on June 5, 2026. The grand opening of Sky Zone was held on June 19, 2026.

In December, 2025, it was announced that a new immersive experience would open in the lower level of the former Sears anchor. Lighthouse Immersive Studios signed a 10-year lease with the city of Moreno Valley to partner on a project to develop an immersive and interactive museum and art space. It is to be called the Moreno Valley Museum and Art Space.

== Major anchors ==
- Harkins Theatres
- Macy's
- J. C. Penney
- Round1 Entertainment
- Sky Zone
- Moreno Valley Museum and Art Space

== Former anchors ==
- Harris - Store converted into Gottschalks in 1999.
- Gottschalks - Store closed in 2008 due to struggles before bankruptcy in 2009.
- May Company - Store converted into Robinsons-May in 1993.
- Robinsons-May - Store converted into Macy's in 2006.
- Sears - Store closed due to company's struggle in February 2020.
- Your Furniture Place - Store closed in 2024 due to company struggles.
