= Redlands Mall =

Former mall in Redlands, California

- Location: Redlands, California, United States
- Coordinates: 34°03′23″N 117°11′03″W
- Opened: March 10, 1977
- Closed: September 30, 2010
- Developer: The Hahn Company
- Manager: The Howard Hughes Corporation and General Growth Properties
- Owner: The Howard Hughes Corporation and General Growth Properties
- Num. of anchor tenants: 2 (at its opening)
- Floor area: Over 173,000 square feet (16,100 m^{2})
- Floors: 2

Redlands Mall was a small shopping mall in Redlands, California, with two anchors, CVS Pharmacy and Gottschalks. The mall, located on about 12 acres on Orange Street and Eureka Street between Redlands Boulevard and Citrus Avenue, was built in 1977. The mall permanently closed in 2010.

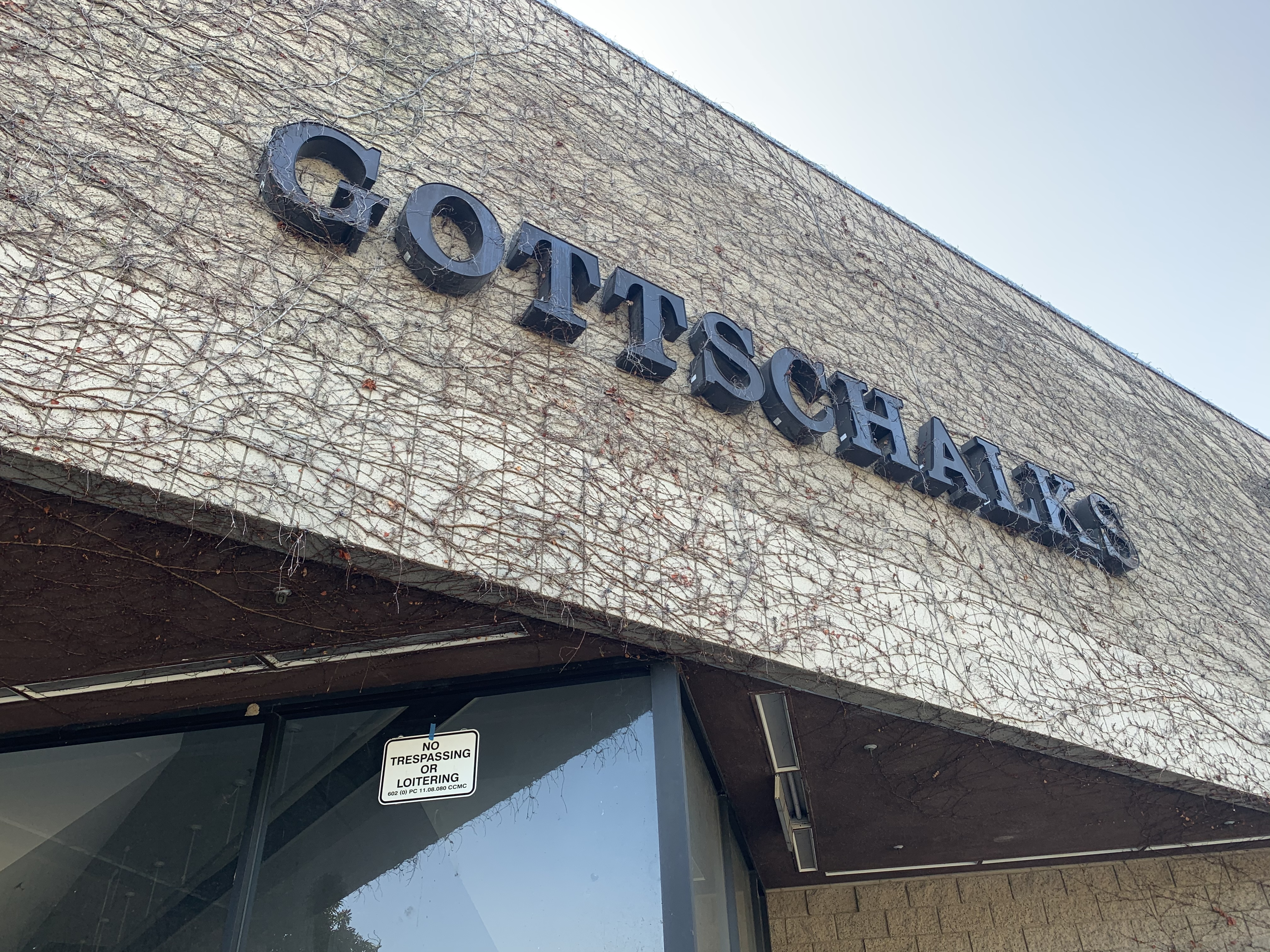
Former Gottschalks North Entrance at the Redlands Mall

The mall is currently being demolished as of March 16, 2026.

== History ==
The mall was planned in 1977 to revitalize the city of Redlands. After demolishing some stores and the La Posada Hotel, the mall was built by The Hahn Company. The Redlands Mall would open on March 10, 1977. It offered more than 173,000 square feet of enclosed leasable space and a 12,586-square-foot freestanding retail building. It had two floors and contained a Sav-on Drugs store (which was re-branded to a CVS Pharmacy) and Harris'. The all cinder block brick design was criticized for not reflecting the design elements it replaced and its surrounding area. By the mid '90s the mall was showing signs of weakness with most popular stores being replaced by independent tenants.

In 1998, original tenant Harris' closed being replaced by Gottschalks shortly after since the Harris-Gottschalks acquisition took place that same year. The mall started struggling in the early 2000s when sales dropped to exceedingly low numbers. After only twelve years as a tenant, Gottschalks filed for bankruptcy in 2009 and closed all stores, including the Redlands Mall location. After struggling financially after the closure of Gottschalks, the closure of the mall was announced on September 30, 2010, by its owners, Howard Hughes and General Growth Properties. All leases were terminated.

=== Redevelopment, State Street Village ===
In July 2014, San Diego–based Brixton Capital LP, the private equity investment vehicle for BruttenGlobal, purchased the mall and announced plans to convert the mall to a mixed-use project with residential and retail development. Brixton later stated they would not develop the site unless it owned the entire lot as the deal did not include the city owned parking lot surrounding the mall. The City later sold the parking lot for $1.95 million to Brixton in 2017.

The Brixton developer abandoned its plans and sold the mall to Village Partners Inc. Newport Beach developer Village Partners purchased the property and announced their own redevelopment plans called "State Street Village" in 2020. Plans included 700 high end apartments and condominiums, more than 12,000 square feet of office space and 72,000 square feet of street retail. Rooftop bars, pedestrian paseos, and a structured parking site. A 23,000 square foot private plaza and public art arch with a connection to West State Street shops. The developer states the design and make up of State Street Village would mirror and incorporate design elements common to Redlands. Spanish, Mediterranean, 19th century Victorian and craftsman styles. Mostly mimic-ing the designs found east of the site, on east State Street. The local CVS store would move to a new purposely built building south of the mall site. By the start of 2022, the Dennys restaurant, a mattress store and a Union bank had already moved out of the mall lot.

In 2020, a group of residents led by former mayor Bill Cunningham expressed concerns about proposed redevelopment, focusing on building height restrictions and the impact of the under-construction Arrow rail line. This led to the introduction of ballot Measure F, which proposed limiting building heights near downtown train stations to three stories, with some exceptions near the University of Redlands. The measure was negotiated between the University of Redlands and the Redlands City Council, who argued that Measure F would preserve the city's historic charm while balancing the need for increased housing. However, some local leaders opposed the measure, citing concerns about addressing the California housing shortage. Critics of Measure F also raised potential legal challenges, suggesting it might violate state law SB 330 by downzoning land zoned for residential development. Ultimately, the measure faced opposition from two camps: those who supported higher density development, and original petitioners who felt it didn't limit density enough. Measure F was defeated in November 2022, with a majority voting against the proposed restrictions.

In May 2022 the Redlands City Council and the Planning Commission approved Village Partners plans, renamed the development "State Street Village". Village Partners stated they do not plan to go over three to four stories anyways and respect the downtown Redlands design elements to its Transit Oriented Development plans. Village Partners has stated demolition and construction would commence in the summer of 2023.

=== Delays and Sale, Again ===
County filings in early 2025 revealed Village Partners Inc. had defaulted on its business loans and the Redlands Mall property was scheduled for public auction, postponing the development. When local media reported the defaults, Village Partner inc, released a statement stating they are reevaluating their timeline for construction and working with its lender, Hankey Capital LLC to avoid the foreclosure sale. Village Partners Inc. requested postponement of the auction multiple times up until May 1st, 2025. By May 6th, 2025, Hankey Capital withdrew the foreclosure sale and canceled the auction per public records. Per filed title records, the loan was restructured and Village Partners was allowed to keep ownership of the mall site with new loan conditions, although the State Street Village development had remained uncertain as Village Partners was granted five years by Hankey Capital to break ground. Village Partners Inc. spokesperson last commented in February 2025 stating minor refinements were being made to State Street Village but emphasized that "the overall vision would remain intact and that updates would be shared publicly in the coming months".

By the end of 2025, Village Partners Inc. sold the mall site to Town Square Development LLC, owned by local billionaire Jack Dangermond for $16 million. A spokesperson for Dangermond stated “There are no specific plans yet, but the goal is to move reasonably quickly....”. Demolition of the mall site was announced, work began the week of March 16, 2026.
