= Harris & Frank =

Clothing retailer

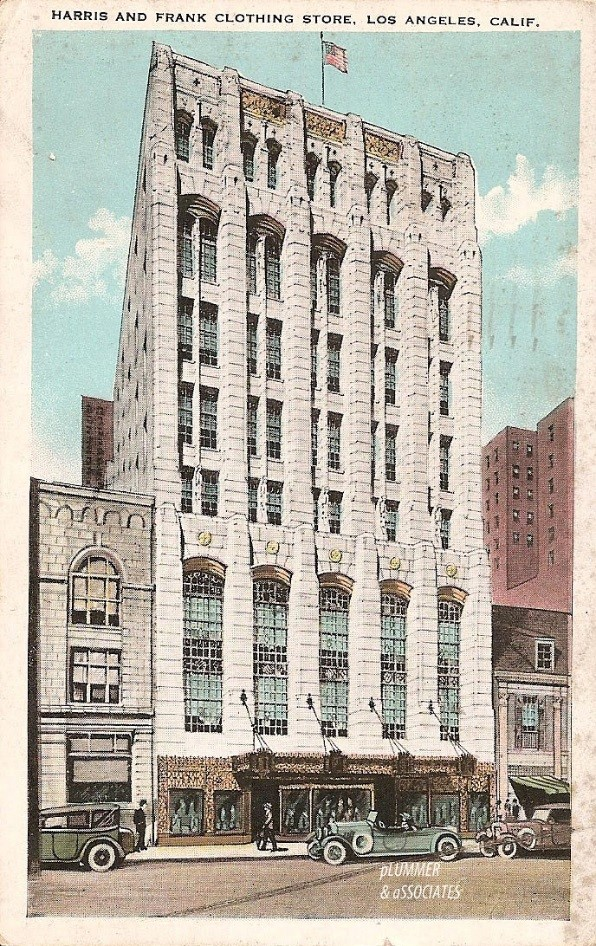
Harris & Frank flagship store at 635-9 S. Hill St. in Downtown Los Angeles, opened in 1925.

Harris & Frank was a clothing retailer and major chain in the history of retail in Southern California, which at its peak had around 40 stores across Southern California and in neighboring states and regions. Its history dates back to a clothing store founded by Leopold Harris in Los Angeles in 1856 near the city's central plaza, only eight years after the city had passed from Mexican to American control. Herman W. Frank joined Harris in partnership 32 years later in 1888.

== Leopold Harris ==
=== Family ===
Leopold Harris originally Lewin Hirschkowitz (LEH-vin-HIRSH-koh-vits), (c.1836–1910) was born into a Jewish household to parents whose names are quoted differently by two different sources. His own advertisement for his name change to Leopold Harris states his father's name as Feibisch and his mother's as Hannah. However, the Jewish Museum of the American West states his parents' names as Morris and Johanna and lists the following siblings who emigrated:

- Stella who married Rudolph Anker of San Bernardino, who had a dry goods and clothing store there
- Zara who married Maurice Diego Katz of San Bernardino
- Emma who married Simon Goldsmith, who ran a country store in San Bernardino, and later a shoe store in Santa Ana
- Herman and Philip who worked for Simon Goldsmith in Santa Ana, then opened their own clothing store there
- Leo who established a country store in Lancaster, as well as a ranch and a freight business
- Herman, Philip, and Arthur who with Leopold's help, founded the Harris Department Stores in San Bernardino in 1905.

In his name change advertisement, Leopold Harris mentioned his brother's Moritz, and his sister Rosa Sommerfeld, who had remained in or near Löbau (as of 1872).

=== Löbau, Prussia ===
Harris (Hirschkowitz) was born in the town of Löbau in the Province of Prussia, Kingdom of Prussia, which in 1871 became part of a united Germany. In 1920 this part of Germany was ceded to the newly recreated country of Poland. In Polish, the town is now called Lubawa. The town was also the birthplace of prominent Los Angeles businessman Harris Newmark and of the Jacoby brothers, who also founded a major Los Angeles department store, Jacoby Bros.

=== Emigration to the U.S. ===
He arrived in the United States, in 1852 at the age of 16, spent time in Kentucky, then traveled via Nicaragua together with fellow Löbauer Harris Newmark, to California, arriving in October 1853 and establishing his store on the Los Angeles Plaza in 1856.

=== First business partnerships ===
Leopold Harris decided to enter business in the new Mormon colony of San Bernardino, California. He created the partnership Lewis & Harris there with Lewis Jacobs, which they dissolved in April 1862. He then spent some time outside the U.S., then returned to Los Angeles and founded the London Clothing Company.

He became a U.S. citizen in 1857. With Henry M. Cohn (or Cohen), Harris formed the business partnership Cohen & Harris to raise and graze sheep at San Gabriel, which they dissolved in 1860. In 1862, they partnered again and opened a kosher meat market. Harris also participated in a business partnership in San Francisco. In 1868 he married Minna Jastrowitz, sister of his business partner Benno Jastrowitz. In 1972, he officially changed his name from Lewin Hirschkowitz to Leopold Harris.

He died in 1910 on Long Island, New York on his way back to Los Angeles after falling ill on a trip to Europe.

== Historic photos ==
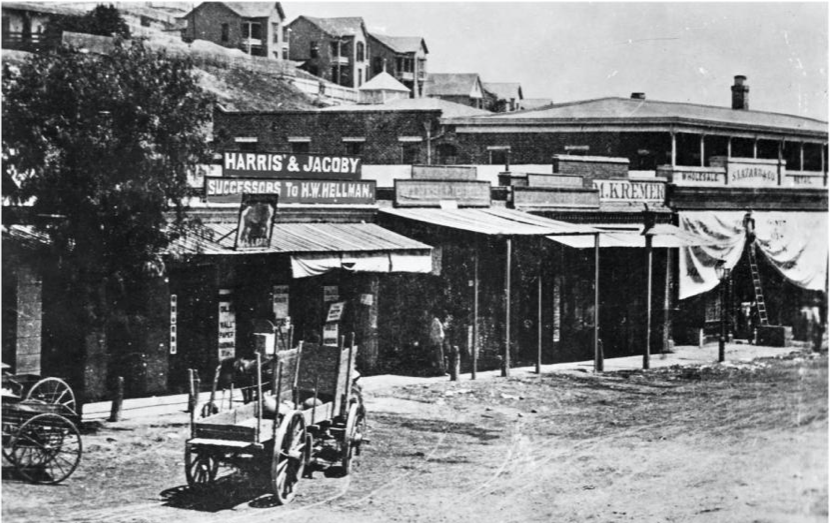
Sign for "Harris & Jacoby, successors to H. W. Hellman", forerunner to both Harris & Frank and Jacoby Bros., in the Old Downey Block around 1870. At right are signs for M. Kremer's and S. Lazard's stores, both forerunners of the City of Paris department store

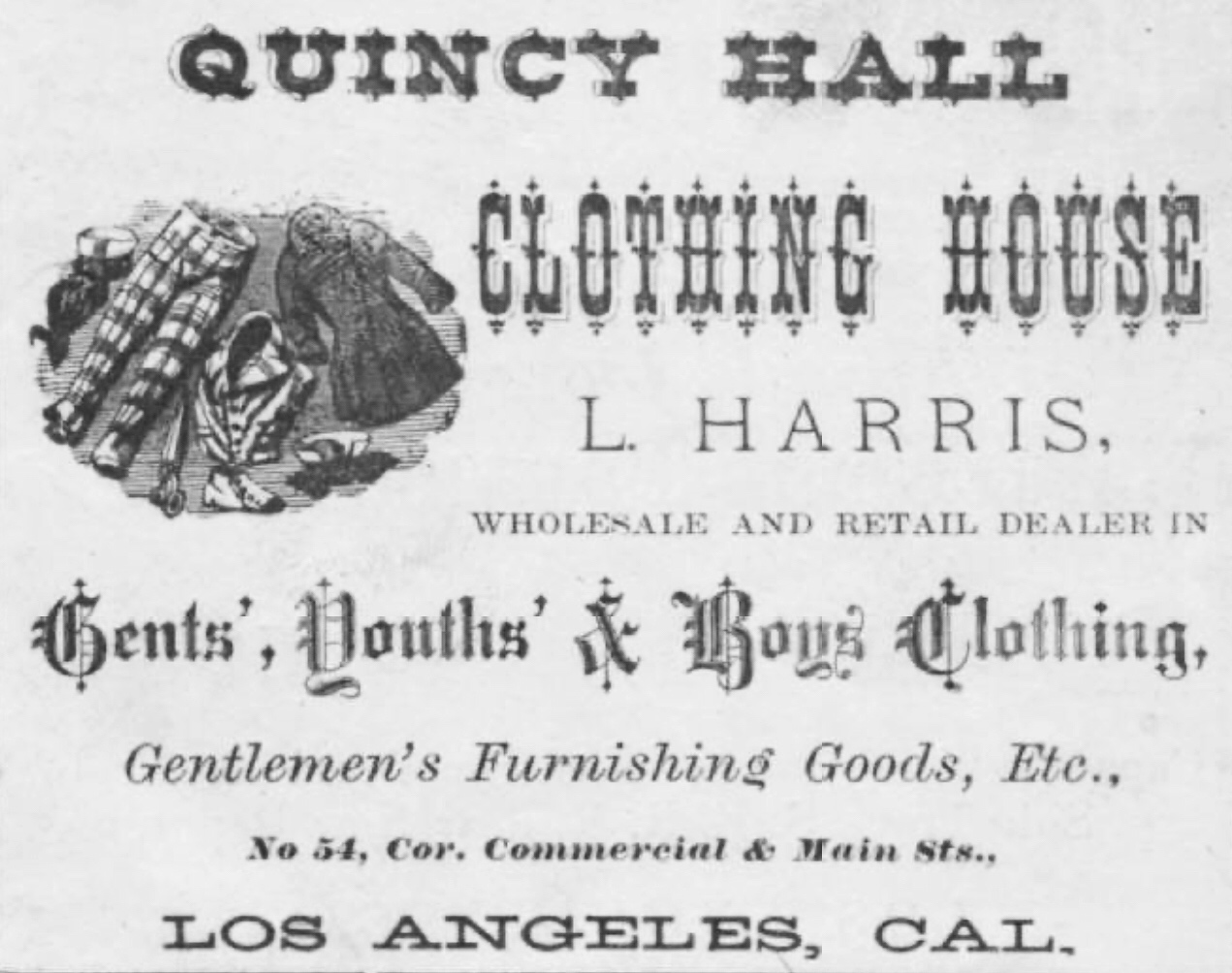
1878 ad for Quincy Hall in city directory

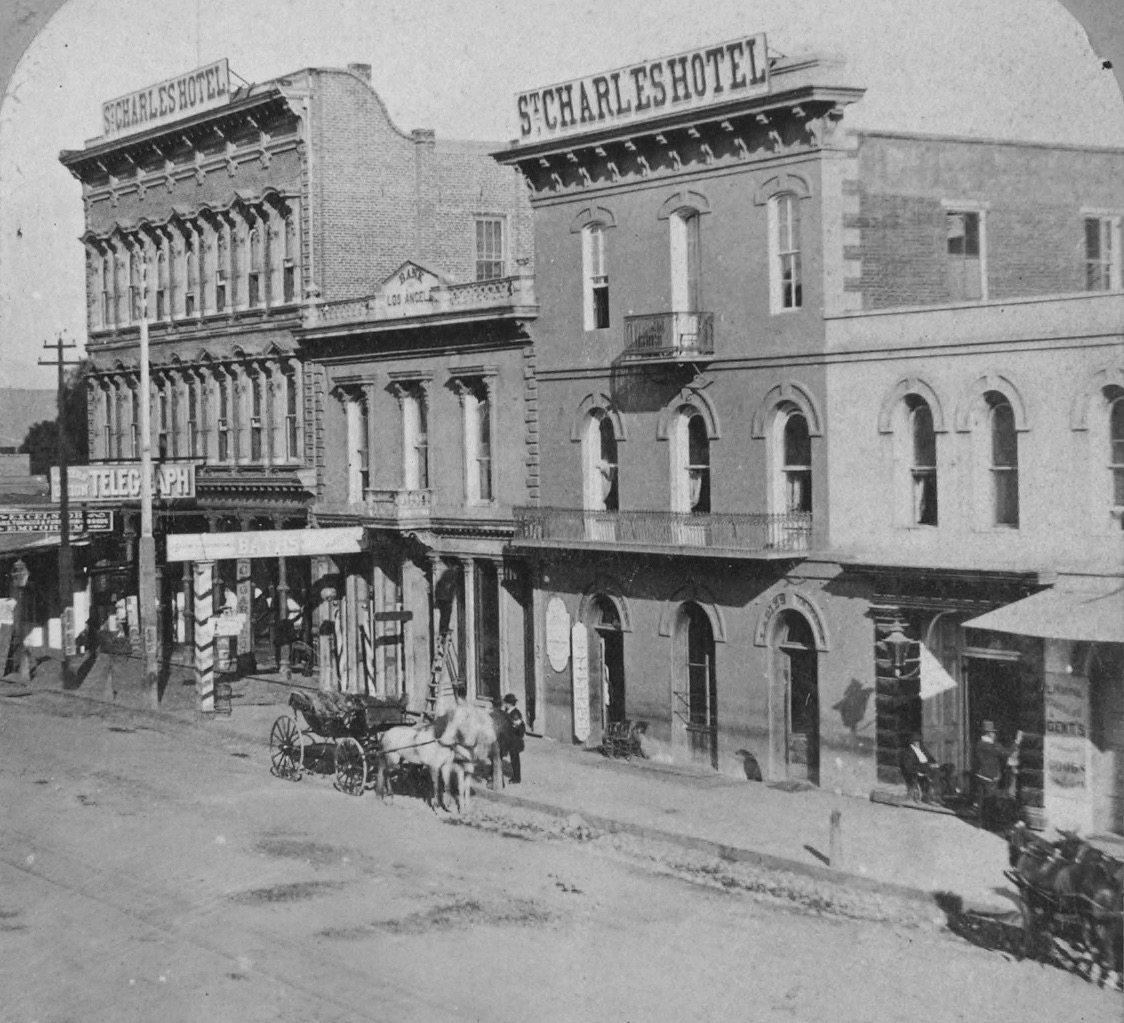
At far right, "L. Harris" sign is visible, when Harris' Quincy Hall store was located at 54 N. Main St. (old numbering, loc. approx. 308 N. Main today), c.1878

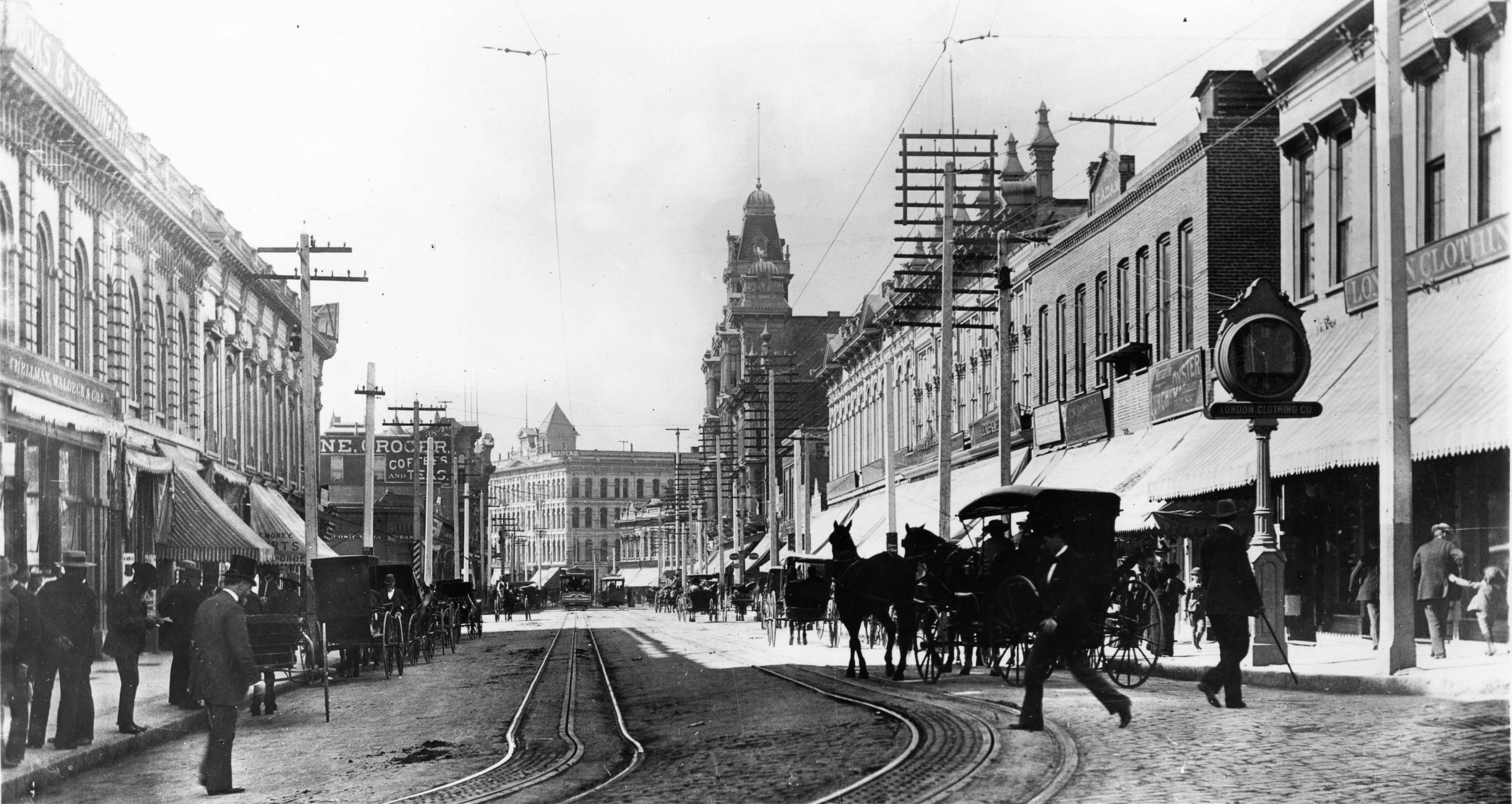
Harris & Frank's London Clothing Co., with its landmark clock, visible at far right in Allen Block. View south on Spring St. from Temple, c.1883–1894. The towers in the background are the Phillips Block; the two larger buildings to its right are the Jones Block and (with turrets) City of Paris.

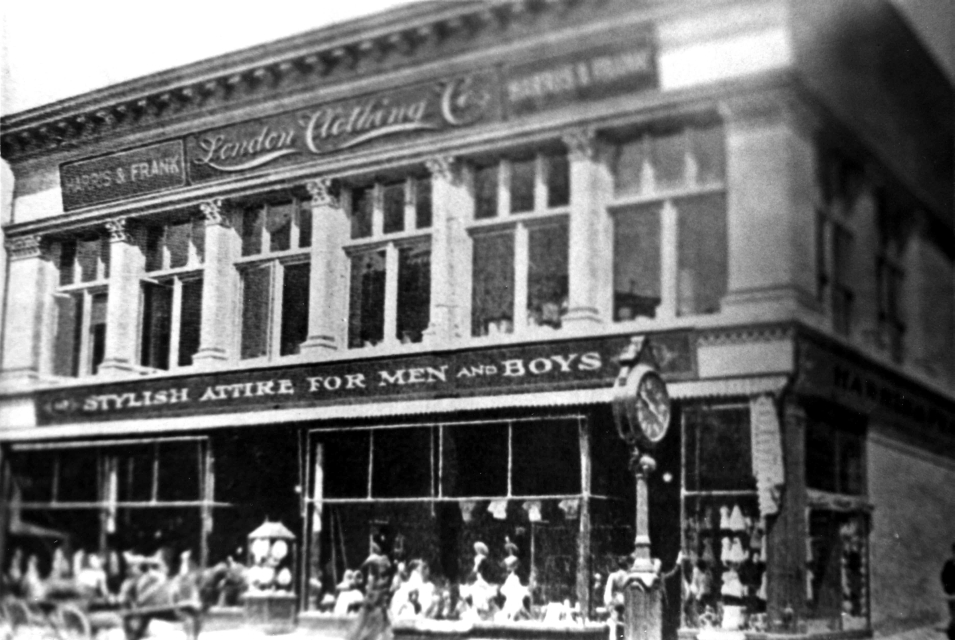
London Clothing Co., 119–125 N. Spring, c.1894-1900

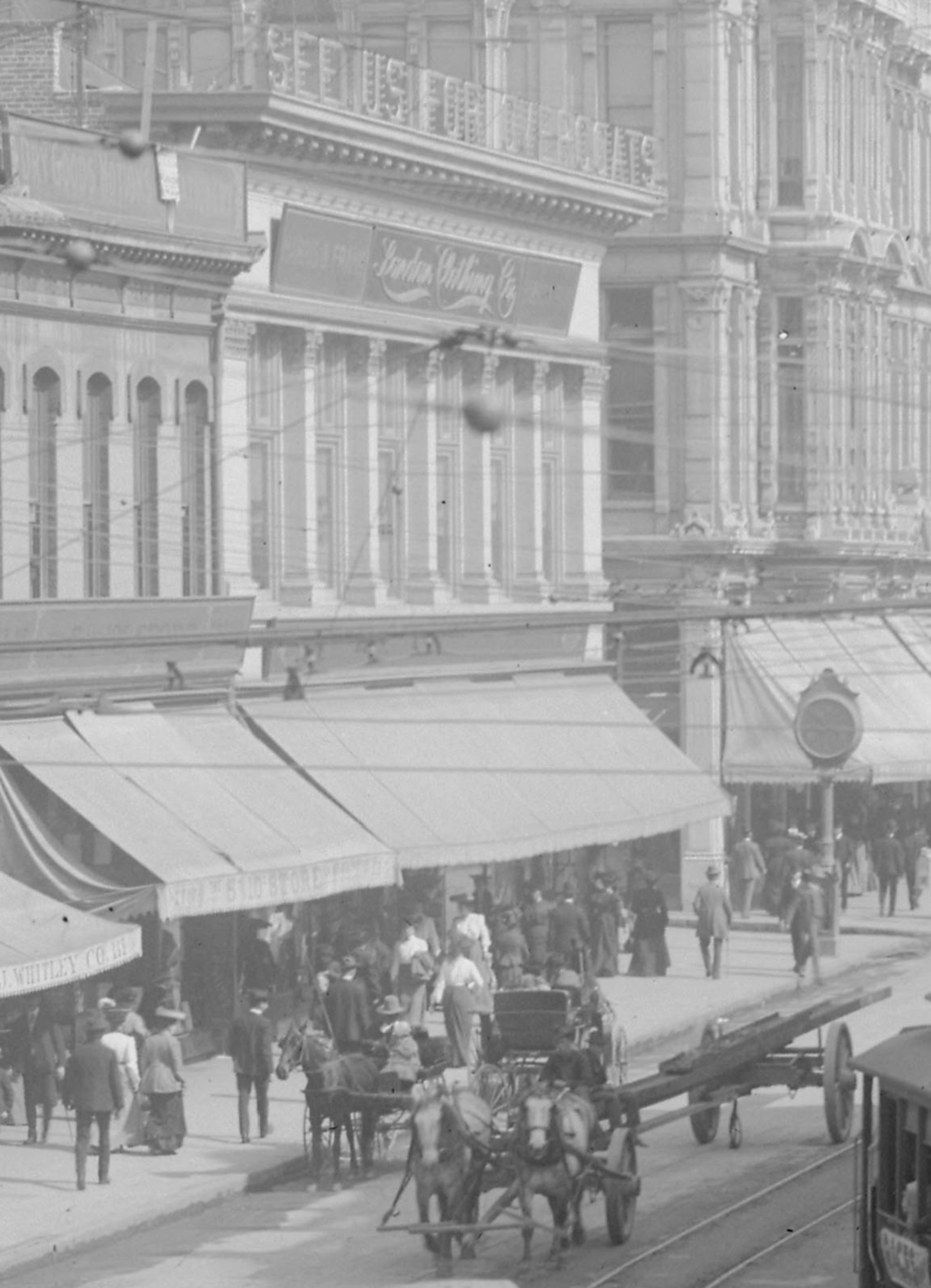
Another view of the 119–125 N. Spring store. Roofline sign: "SEE US FOR OVERCOATS"

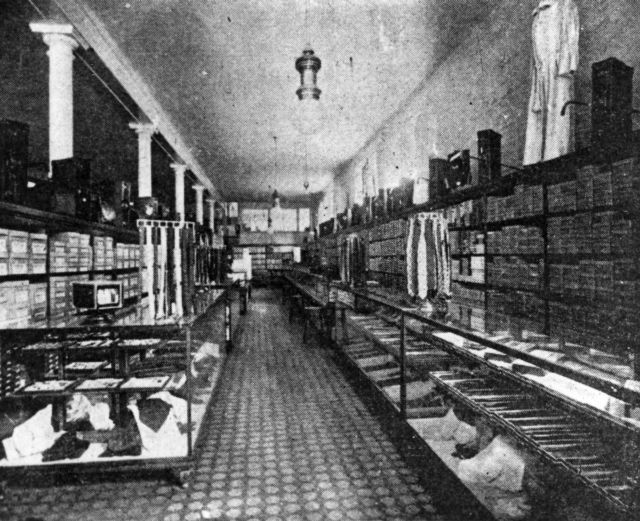
Inside the 119–125 N. Spring store, 1903

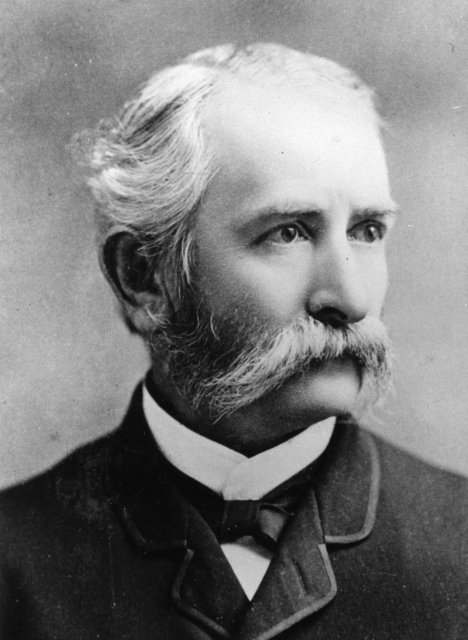
Leopold Harris late 1800s

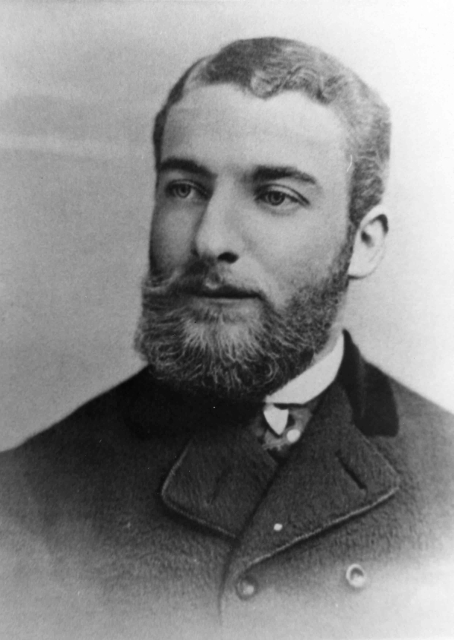
Herman W. Frank in 1888

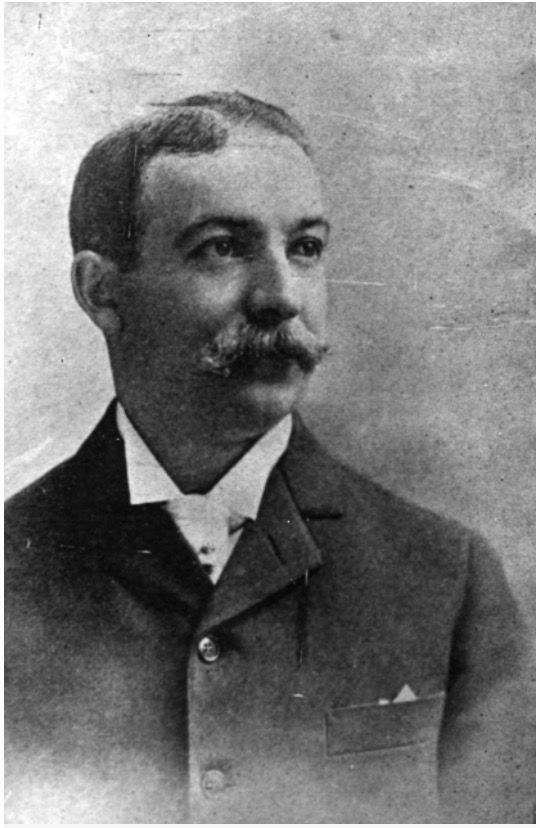
Herman W. Frank in 1902

== History ==
=== Harris & Frank (1860s–1947) ===
Harris's first store, then called The London Clothing Co., was on the Los Angeles Plaza. Harris, alone and with partners, operated a succession of locations, each time further southwest from the Plaza, as the main shopping district moved in tandem.

By 1870, Harris joined Isaac, Nathan, Charles, Abraham, and Lessor Jacoby to buy out Herman W. Hellman's store, to form Harris & Jacoby, which was not only a forerunner of Harris & Frank but of Jacoby Bros., which would grow into a department store that would do business in Los Angeles through the 1930s. The Jacoby brothers also came from Löbau, Prussia.

From 1876 to 1882 the store operated as the Quincy Hall Clothing House, at 63 Main St., (pre-1890 numbering), in the Downey Block. (at the time, Commercial St. ran eastward from Main St. just north of Temple St.)

In January 1883, Harris entered into partnership with Benno Jastrowitz, brother of his wife Minna Jastrowitz, as L. Harris & Co..

By February 1883, the Quincy House store had closed and the new L. Harris & Co. store was doing business on the south side of Temple Street in a building that stretched the short distance between Spring and New High streets: 129–131 Spring and 5-7-9 New High streets, in the pre-1890 numbering. This is currently the north end of the Los Angeles City Hall block.

In July 1886, Harris and Jastrowitz re-added the moniker London Clothing Co.

On June 4, 1888, Jastrowitz sold his part of the business partnership to Herman W. Frank (b. 1860, Walla Walla, Washington), who started as a clerk in Harris' store and married Harris' daughter Sarah. Thus, the business came to have the name it would bear for over a century: Harris & Frank.

By 1894, the store was at 119–125 N. Spring at the southwest corner of Franklin St.

By 1903, the store was under the management of Harris' son, Harry L. Harris, and his two sons-in-law, Herman W. Frank and M.C. Adler.

By 1905, the store moved further south to 337–341 S. Spring St., between Third and Fourth streets. For a few months operated concurrently with the Spring and Franklin store.

In 1907, the store moved just a block south to 447–443 S. Spring St., between Fourth and Fifth streets.

In 1925, Harris & Frank moved further south and west to 635–639 S. Hill St., one block west of Broadway, which had become the main shopping thoroughfare. The building now houses the Wholesale Jewelry Mart.

=== Brooks Clothing Co. (1922–1947) ===
The Brooks Clothing Company opened in 1922 in Los Angeles at 337–9 S. Spring St., Downtown Los Angeles, previously the main store of The Hub Clothing Co.. The company sold suits and overcoats at one price only, $25. The company quickly established a network of stores in the downtown areas of the surrounding towns in Southern California, such as Long Beach, Pasadena, Santa Ana, as well as the San Francisco Bay Area, Stockton, and Fresno.

In 1935, Brooks Clothing moved its flagship store from 337–9 S. Spring to 644 S. Broadway, the former W. & J. Sloane flagship store. The seven-story building was redesigned and modernized by architect Harbin F. Hunter at a cost of $75,000 "in complete conformity with the modern school".

=== Harris & Frank (1947–1990s) ===
In 1947, Harris & Frank merged with Brooks Clothing Co., acquiring its flagship store at 644 S. Broadway and its 14 branches. "Harris & Frank" stores had operated in Downtown Los Angeles since 1888 but finally, 59 years later, there would be a network of "Harris & Frank" stores across Southern California and beyond. After the merger, Harris & Frank closed its pre-merger flagship store at 635

As of 1950, Harris & Frank had 15 branches. That year, it closed its pre-merger flagship store on Hill Street, which had was only a block west of the Broadway (former Brooks flagship) store. In the same year they opened a store in North Hollywood's downtown shopping district along Lankershim Blvd., and a few years later opened at Panorama City Shopping Center, five miles to the northwest.

In 1959, H. Daroff and Sons, makers of the Botany 500 line of men's clothing, bought Harris & Frank which at that time had 21 branches. In 1970, Northern California chain Pauson's was merged and Pauson's stores were renamed Harris & Frank, bringing the total number of H&F stores to 40.

In 1970, Botany Industries, Inc. bought both Harris & Frank and Pauson's, a men's clothier founded by Samuel Pauson in 1875 in San Francisco, and long a fixture at the corner of Sutter and Kearney streets in that city. The 16 Pauson's locations in Northern California and Reno, Nevada were rebranded Harris & Frank. In 1972, Harris & Frank closed the Sutter & Kearney location.

In 1971, Botany sold Harris & Frank to Phillips-Van Heusen Corp. of New York, now named PVH Corp., owner of Tommy Hilfiger, Calvin Klein and other brands.

In 1980, Harris & Frank closed its sole remaining location in Downtown Los Angeles at 644 S. Broadway. As of 1981, the chain had 31 stores in California, Nevada, and Texas.

By 1992, H&F had closed stores and there were only 17 remaining. Phillips-Van Heusen sold 12 of them to Miami-based Alan Glist, the owner of the Alan Stuart men's sportswear company, and who later bought the Florida men's clothing chain Baron's. Glist attempted to "save" the stores by moving to a discount format, in a market where sales of suits had diminished greatly due to changing dress codes and preferences.

Under Glist, stores continued to close, although a new store was opened in Los Cerritos Center. By 1994, the only stores left open were Brea, Cerritos, Torrance, Riverside, North Hollywood and Huntington Beach.

== Harris' other businesses ==
=== Retail ===
Harris moved to San Bernardino for eight years, and together with his other nephew Arthur, founded the Harris Company in San Bernardino, California, which would become a large, grand department store and a chain across the Inland Empire. All three nephews had worked for Leopold Harris at his Los Angeles store. Afterwards, Harris moved back to Los Angeles.

His nephews Philip and Herman Harris operated the White House store in Santa Ana, California.

=== Real estate ===
Mr. Frank was also a real estate developer of the Allen Block at Temple and Spring streets, in 1887 the Salisbury Block on Spring St., and in 1898 the site of Niles Pease Furniture until 1907 and afterwards the Harris & Frank store, 437–443 S. Spring Street. In 1887, Herman W. Frank (d. 1941) started working for Harris, and became a partner in the business a year in 1888, when its name was changed to Harris & Frank. Frank became Harris's son-in-law by marrying his daughter Sarah.

== Locations ==
Stores were in California unless otherwise indicated. BC = Original Brooks Clothing Co. stores. Most rebranded H&F in 1947.
P = Original Pausons stores, PE = Pausons/Eaglesons stores. Most rebranded H&F in 1970.
HF = opened as or were rebranded Harris & Frank stores

B	P	HF	Opened	Closed	City/District	Location	Notes	Sources
Stores opened as Harris and Frank 1880s–1940s (all in Downtown Los Angeles)
		HF	1883	c.1894	Downtown L.A.	129-131 Spring St. & 5-7-9 New High St.	Pre-1890 building numbering. Los Angeles City Hall now stands on this block.	
		HF	c.1894	c.1905	Downtown L.A.	119-125 N. Spring St.	SW corner of Franklin St.	
		HF	c.1905	1907	Downtown L.A.	337-341 S. Spring St.		
		HF	1907	1925	Downtown L.A.	443-447 S. Spring St.		
		HF	1929	1950	Downtown L.A.	635–639 Hill Street	now Wholesale Jewelry Mart	
Opened as Brooks Clothing Co.
B			1922	c.Oct. 1935	Downtown L.A.	337–9 S. Spring	Brooks flagship. Previously The Hub Clothing Co. from 1916 to 1922, 1909-16 two separate stores (clothing, shoes, phonographs...), 1908 Adler Clothing, from 1905 to 1907, Harris & Frank (see above).	
B			Sep. 27, 1923	c.1928	Downtown L.A.	348 S. Broadway	2nd concurrent Brooks Downtown L.A. location	
B			Apr. 19, 1924	c.1928	Downtown L.A.	420 S. Main	3rd concurrent Brooks Downtown L.A. location	
B			Mar. 1925		Downtown L.A.	329 W. 5th at Hill	4th concurrent Brooks Downtown L.A. location, 10,000 sq ft (930 m^{2})	
B		HF	Oct. 1935	1980	Downtown L.A.	644 S. Broadway	Previously W. & J. Sloane Bldg, now J. E. Carr Building. 7 stories. Redesigned/modernized, architect Harbin F. Hunter.	
B			By 1924	1927	Long Beach	110–116 W. Third St.		
B			Sep. 21, 1927	Sep. 1935	Long Beach	116 E. Broadway, SE corner of Pine	Entire 2nd floor. 7,800 sq ft (720 m^{2}).	
B		HF	Sep. 1935		Long Beach	240 Pine Ave.		
B			May 1, 1926	June 29, 1932	Oakland	NW corner of 12th at Broadway	Opened as 6th store. Renovation and re-opening August 1929	
B			Feb. 8, 1928	Summer 1942	Hollywood	6660 Hollywood Blvd.		
B		HF	Oct. 31, 1927		Pomona	195 W. Second St.		
B		HF	May 18, 1928		Santa Ana	202 W. Fourth St., corner of Bush	Opened as the 10th store	
During this period the Broadway and Main st. stores in Downtown L.A. closed, lowering the number of stores by two.
B		HF	Oct. 2, 1928		San Bernardino	347 E St. at Court	Opened as the 9th store	
B		HF	Jan. 23, 1929		San Diego	916 Fifth Ave.	Opened as the 10th store, moved to 416–8 Broadway	
B		HF	Feb. 1929		Huntington Park	6400 Pacific Blvd. at Gage	Opened as the 11th store	
B		HF	c.Apr. 1929		Glendale	114/224 N. Brand Ave.		
B		HF	Jun. 1, 1929		Santa Barbara	821 State Street		
B			by Nov. 1929		San Jose			
B			Nov. 4, 1929		San Francisco	111 Sutter	opened as 19th store	
B			Nov. 1929		Pasadena	152 E. Colorado Blvd.	Opened as store #20	
B			Dec. 6, 1929		Stockton	333 E. Main St.	Opened as store #22	
B			Dec. 19, 1929		Fresno	1034 Fulton St.	Opened as store #23	
B			c.1930		Ventura	478 E. Main		
Note: Brooks Clothing closed seven stores in 1932.
B		HF	1936		Miracle Mile	5450–4 Wilshire Bl. at Cochran	Morgan, Walls & Clements, architects	
B		HF	By 1937		Santa Monica	1254 Third Street		
B		HF	November 9, 1939		Belvedere, now East Los Angeles	4789 Whittier Bl. at Fetterley near Arizona		
B		HF	by 1941		Pasadena	390 E. Colorado Blvd.	Razed	
B		HF	Summer 1942		Hollywood	6307-9 Hollywood Bl. at Vine		
Opened as Pauson's and Pauson's/Eagleson's
	P	HF			San Francisco	Kearney and Sutter	Flagship	
	P	HF			Daly City	Westlake Shopping Center		
	P	HF			Fremont	The Hub		
	P	HF			Mountain View	Mayfield Mall		
	P	HF			Reno, Nevada	Park Lane Centre		
	P	HF		1967 or -8	Downtown San Jose	127 S. First		
	P	HF	1967 or -8		San Jose	Valley Fair		
	P	HF			San Leandro	Bay Fair		
	P	HF			San Mateo	Hillsdale		
	P	HF			Stockton	Weberstown Mall		
	PE	HF			Sacramento	801 K Street		
	PE	HF			Sacramento	Country Club Centre		
	PE	HF			Sacramento	Southgate Shopping Center		
Opened as Harris and Frank 1950s–1990s
		HF			Canoga Park	Fallbrook Square		
		HF			Culver City	Fox Hills Mall		
		HF		after 1987	Lakewood	Lakewood Center		
		HF	1950		North Hollywood	5236 Lankershim Blvd., corner of McCormick (near Magnolia)		
		HF		after 1987	Northridge	Northridge Fashion Center		
		HF		by 1987	City of Orange	Mall of Orange		
		HF		c.end 1982	Redondo Beach	1901 Hawthorne Blvd.		
		HF			Riverside	3622 Plaza Mall		
		HF	Aug. 31, 1955		San Mateo	Hillsdale Shopping Center		
		HF	Apr. 7, 1955		Van Nuys	6723 Van Nuys Bl.	As of 2023: Crunch Fitness. In an on-street shopping district near Butler Bros., later Dearden's	
		HF	Sep. 19, 1957		West Covina	Eastland Center		
		HF	1959		Pasadena	Hastings Ranch Center (Foothill at Rosemead)		
		HF	Nov. 10, 1960	prob. 1967↔︎	Santa Ana	Honer Plaza		
		HF	1962	by 1987	Chula Vista	Chula Vista Center		
		HF	Mar. 12, 1964		Buena Park	Buena Park Mall		
		HF	Nov. 26, 1965	after 1987	Downey	Stonewood Shopping Center		
		HF	Nov. 17, 1966	after 1987	Huntington Beach	Huntington Center		
		HF	1967	after 1987	Costa Mesa	South Coast Plaza		
		HF	Nov. 7, 1968	by 1987	Century City	Century City Shopping Center		
		HF	by 1978		Arcadia	Santa Anita Fashion Park		
		HF	by 1978		Bakersfield	Valley Plaza Mall		
		HF	by 1978		Brea	Brea Mall		
		HF	by 1978	by 1987	El Cajon	Parkway Plaza		
		HF	by 1978	c.mid-1982	Escondido	Escondido Village Mall		
		HF	by 1978	by 1987	City of Industry	Puente Hills Mall		
		HF	by 1978	by 1987	Laguna Hills	Laguna Hills Mall		
		HF	by 1978	by 1987	Oxnard	Esplanade Mall		
		HF	by 1978	Sep. 1982	San Bernardino	Central City Mall		
		HF	by 1978	by 1987	San Diego	Fashion Valley		
		HF	by 1978		Las Vegas	The Boulevard Center		
		HF	by 1978		Corpus Christi, Texas	Padre Staples Mall		
		HF	c.Nov. 1989		Scottsdale, Arizona	Scottsdale Fashion Square		
		HF	Feb. 1990		Phoenix, Arizona	Paradise Valley Mall	Upon opening H&F had 17 stores in So. Cal., 3 in Las Vegas and 2 in Phoenix area	
		HF	c.Apr. 1994		Cerritos	Los Cerritos Center		

== Notes ==
1Photographic evidence in Wilson's book shows Harris & Jacoby in the Old Downey Block which was torn down in c. 1870. Also, advertisements for seeds sold at the Hellman store at No. 2 Downey Block, Los Angeles, cease in January 1870 while an ad for the Harris & Jacoby store at No. 2, Downey Block, started appearing in the same newspaper in December 1870. It is currently difficult to establish the exact date in 1870, that the business changed hands from Hellman to Harris and Jacoby, as online archives for Los Angeles newspapers have a gap between the 1864 (for the Star) and 1873 (when the Herald archives commence).
