= The Mall of Victor Valley =

Shopping mall in Victorville, California

Coordinates: 34.47360°N 117.34733°W

- Location: Victorville, California, USA
- Opened: 1986
- Developer: Forest City Enterprises
- Manager: Macerich
- Owner: Macerich
- Num. of stores: 122
- Num. of anchor tenants: 6 (5 open, 1 vacant)
- Floor area: 577,000 sq ft
- Floors: 1
- Website: www.themallofvictorvalley.com

The Mall of Victor Valley is a shopping mall located in Victorville, California. It is owned and managed by Macerich. The mall is located near Interstate 15 and Bear Valley Road.

The mall's anchor stores are JCPenney, Dick's Sporting Goods, Barnes & Noble, Macy's, and Cinemark Theatres. There is 1 vacant anchor store that was once Sears.

== History ==
The shopping mall first opened in November 1986 with three anchors: Harris, JCPenney, and Mervyn's. Sears was later added to the mall in October 1989, along with a 10-screen AMC theatre. In 1999, Gottschalks replaced the Harris store, renaming it as Harris-Gottschalks. Barnes & Noble was added in 2003, and the movie theater was replaced with a Cinemark in 2006.

Mervyn's and Gottschalks closed in 2009. The former Mervyn's location became a Forever 21 and closed on New Year's Eve 2011. JCPenney moved their location to the larger location in October 2012 to compete with the Macy's store, which opened in the former Gottschalks site in March 2013, and in October of that same year, Dick's Sporting Goods opened at the former original JCPenney site.

On November 7, 2019, it was announced that Sears would be closing this location a part of a plan to close 96 stores nationwide. The store closed in February 2020.
