= Carousel Mall =

Former shopping mall in San Bernardino, California

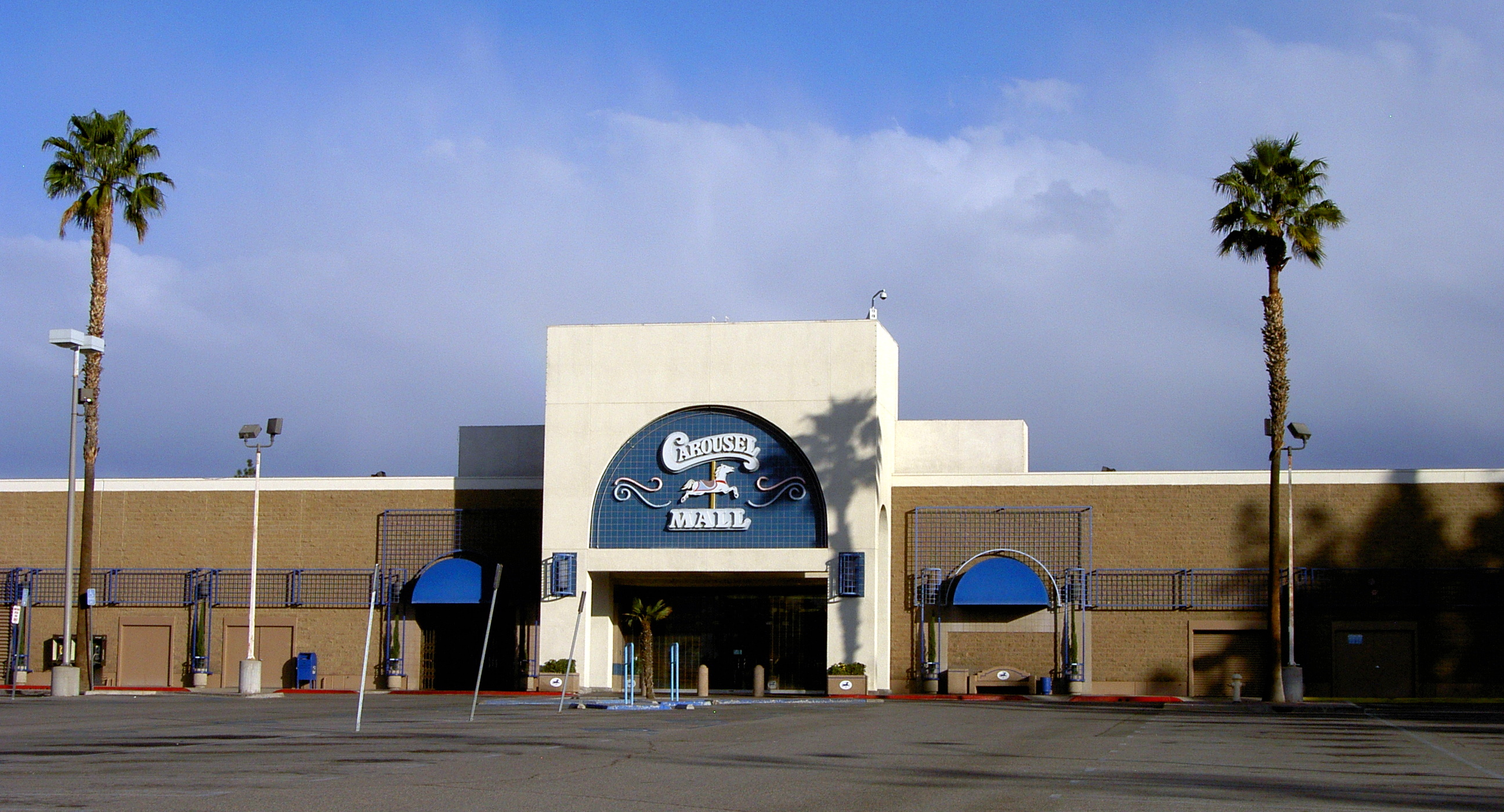
- Carousel Mall entrance, 2009
- Location: San Bernardino, California, United States
- Coordinates: 34.10477°N 117.29629°W
- Address: 295 Carousel Mall
- Opened: October 11, 1972
- Closed: August 22, 2017
- Previous names: Central City Mall (1972–1991)
- Owner: City of San Bernardino
- Architect: Victor Gruen Associates
- Num. of stores: 117
- Floors: 2 (3 in Harris')

Carousel Mall was a mixed-use two-story shopping mall in San Bernardino, California, along the city's main downtown street. It opened as Central City Mall in 1972, and was renovated and renamed in 1991. It closed in 2017, and was demolished in 2023.

== History ==
=== As Central City Mall (1972–1991) ===
Originally opened on October 11, 1972 as Central City Mall, with two stories, 52 stores, and 3 major anchor stores, JCPenney, Montgomery Ward, and The Harris Company, which has been at its location since 1927. The idea of the mall was for an urban renewal project for the downtown district of San Bernardino. Central City Mall was to be the first big step in revitalizing the city. It was built adjacent to 3rd Street which was the retail district at that time in San Bernardino. Two years after it opened, the city made a plan that called for a long list of ideas and projects that never happened, including an aerial monorail tramway, a new commerce building, a fourth anchor store for the mall, and a Central City park.

During the late 1970s, the mall already started to encounter problems. One of the mall's largest challenges were the local gangs that used the mall as a gathering place. It was also due to lack of organization from the mall changing hands with different management companies as well as city leaders who had a financial interest in the success of the mall. These problems continued into the late 1980s, and the developers made a new revitalization plan to renovate the mall to attract more people.

=== As Carousel Mall (1991–2017) ===
In 1991, the mall's owners renamed it Carousel Mall and added a large carousel, colorful interior decoration, and brighter façades to attract families with young children, and alienate gang members. Despite the renovation, the mall started losing business throughout the rest of the 1990s.

The downtown area returned to a declining trend as people decided to shop at Inland Center, which acquired Gottschalks after it moved from the Carousel Mall to Inland Center after merging with The Harris Company (and Gottschalks was already present as an anchor at Inland Center). Inland Center, compared to Carousel Mall, succeeded in keeping stores open and filling its vacancies due to its closer proximity to the I-215/I-10 interchange and retention of anchor businesses.

In 2001, Montgomery Ward went out of business and closed, leaving only JCPenney for another year before it was the final anchor to close its doors later in 2003. In response to the anchor closures, the mall's owners at the time allowed a mixed-use concept to fill vacated retail outlets at its 3rd Street entrance and its western court/lobby with county offices. The County of San Bernardino remained the largest tenant of the mall until their move out of the mall prior to its closure.

LNR Property Corp purchased the property in February 2006 with the intention of developing a high density residential and commercial project, but nothing has come from the development. In January 2008, LNR Corp sold the Carousel Mall property. The adjoining movie theater, CinemaStar, also closed its doors in 2008, further reducing foot traffic to the property. M & D Properties, based out of Lynwood, California, bought the property from LNR Corp for $23.5 million.

On August 22, 2017 the Carousel Mall closed its doors after evicting the remaining tenants that were still open.

== Redevelopment complications ==
Difficulties in returning the mall to its prior state include the further decline of the original San Bernardino downtown area with redevelopment work yielding mixed results, easier development opportunity elsewhere in the city, and legal issues from past redevelopment deals.

There have been efforts in the late 2000s and early 2010s to create positive interest in San Bernardino's downtown region from various agencies and businesses: the reconstruction of the aging I-215 freeway corridor, the reopening of the former CinemaStar facility as a Regal Cinemas Theater, as well as the San Bernardino Express Rapid Transit project completed in 2013 and 2014 have created some interest in the Downtown area, but the surrounding vacancies of business centers and towers around the Carousel Mall remain considerable obstacles to a comprehensive revitalization effort.

San Bernardino still has viable business property and open lots in the more suburban/industrial-centric University District in the north, as well as its current business corridor on Hospitality Drive at the southern border of the city that is more accessible to Loma Linda and Redlands residents. In addition, stores present at Inland Center are not interested in occupying additional retail space that's less than two miles away in an economically depressed area. While Inland Center does have an anchor vacancy (most recent being Sears), a new anchor is more likely to build new on an empty lot than to take up aging facilities.

Commercial developers have made offers in the last two decades for various greyfield plans concerning the property, including rehabilitating it, razing it, or a mixed-use plan to build commercial and residential facilities. Most planning has been turned down by the City of San Bernardino, Mission Native Americans, various financial institutions, and holding corporations, all of whom have a controlling stake in the mall's development from prior years of investment into the property, forming an effective stalemate on future changes. Most recently, City of San Bernardino's bankruptcy proceedings have complicated matters further in addition to the State of California's decision to close Economic Redevelopment Agencies and seize funding from the organizations statewide.

== Redevelopment context ==
The Carousel Mall's failure is best understood in the context of California Redevelopment. First passed in the 1950s as an anti-slum policy, the State of California pioneered the concept of tax-increment financing to promote a modern post-war economy. In reality, very few redevelopment projects succeeded (a notable example is San Francisco's Embarcadero Center), but most became tax-redistribution schemes. The trend accelerated after the passage of Proposition 13. San Bernardino's mall then matched the strategies of contemporaneous failed malls such as the Long Beach Plaza and the Plaza Pasadena. The idea was to condemn grandfathered low property-tax rate properties and redevelop them as retail centers that would concentrate local sales taxes. The lax oversight of local redevelopment agencies also lead to insider deals favorable to redevelopers.

As of August 22, 2017, the mall is closed to public access. The mall once housed more than 300 San Bernardino County employees from different departments. As of 2010, excluding office space, about seventeen retail stores inside the mall were still open for business, including an AM Radio Station and a Jackson Hewitt Tax Center (as of 2012 The Jackson Hewitt Tax Center has closed). The remaining businesses are independently owned, including four operating restaurants. San Bernardino City Unified School District moved its office out of the mall in 2012.

The land on where this mall sits is owned by the city. The carousel from which the mall derived its name was sold by the city in 2018. One part of the property is not owned by the city: a building that formerly housed Gottschalks. On the evening of May 15, 2022, the mall sustained unknown damage due to a vagrant fire.

On July 20, 2022, city leaders approved a plan to demolish the buildings on the 43-acre property and sell the property. On October 14, 2022 Lincoln Property Company withdrew from the project to redevelop the mall site.

On October 27, 2022, a scrap metal thief, or "scrapper", was found dead after being electrocuted while he attempted to steal copper wiring from a substation.

Demolition of the mall began in April 2023 with a November completion date. The City of San Bernardino plans to redevelop the area with office, retail and housing projects.

As of April 6, 2024, the mall has been demolished, but the Harris building, Parking structure, and enterprise building still stand. The Harris building still stands possibly due to it having a different owner than the mall. However the Harris building was donated to the city. Its future is yet to be revealed.

On October 24, 2024 fire engulfed the Harris Building.

On November 20, 2024, a woman who had fallen into a manhole at the former location of the Carousel Mall was rescued by first responders after spending the night inside of the manhole.

As of 2026, the former location of the Carousel Mall site has been described by city leaders as a clean site ready for new development. New developments are ongoing.
