= The Hub (Los Angeles) =

American clothing store

The Hub was a large clothing store that operated in Downtown Los Angeles from 1896 until late 1922.

The Hub opened on March 16, 1896 at 154 (154–200) N. Spring St. in the Bullard Block. In August of that same year, it was purchased by Hyams, Brown, and Co. In January 1909, Jack Hammer took over as president from Mr. A. L. Brown. He full owner in September 1914.

With department stores moving further south and from Spring Street to Broadway, in 1907 The Hub opened a branch at the former premises of the Bon Marché department store in the Bumiller Building, 430 S. Broadway. At first, The Hub stated that it would not close its main store on North Spring Street.

In March 1916, The Hub moved to 337–39 S. Spring Street. In 1922 that store was turned into the Los Angeles branch of Brooks Clothing, which became a chain in Southern California and in 1922, become part of Harris & Frank, the veteran Los Angeles clothing chain.
