= KCAA =

Radio station in Loma Linda, California

- Loma Linda, California; United States
- Broadcast area: Inland Empire
- Frequency: 1050 kHz
- Branding: KCAA Radio

Programming
- Format: Full Service

Ownership
- Owner: Broadcast Management Services

History
- First air date: 1964
- Call sign meaning: "Keeping California Aware"

Technical information
- Licensing authority: FCC
- Facility ID: 43995
- Class: D
- Power: 1,400 watts (day); 35 watts (night)
- Transmitter coordinates: 33°59′22.1″N 117°11′13.1″W
- Translators: 102.3 K272FQ (Riverside); 106.5 K293CF (Moreno Valley)

Links
- Public license information: Public file; LMS
- Webcast: Listen live
- Website: www.kcaaradio.com

KCAA (1050 AM) is a commercial radio station licensed to serve Loma Linda, California. Its studios are located on Industrial Park Avenue in Redlands. KCAA airs news, talk, music and brokered programming.

KCAA carries an eclectic mix of brokered programming for financial services and nutritional supplements, progressive talk radio such as The Stephanie Miller Show and The Thom Hartmann Show, local music podcasts, locally produced shows like Cali's Best hosted by Lashaun Turner, and assorted features such as Beatles-a-Rama, The Twilight Zone Radio Dramas and reruns of Wolfman Jack's oldies shows. All programs, including syndicated programs that run longer, only air on KCAA for one hour each day. National news is provided by NBC News Radio.

== History ==
=== KTOT and KBBV ===
William W. Booth, doing business as the Big Bear Broadcasting Company built KTOT, a 250-watt daytime-only station, in 1964. The station was licensed in December 1965 but went silent in August 1966; KTOT was bankrupt by year's end. Hugh Cover and Donald Stoner, trading as the Mountain Broadcasting Company, bought the station from bankruptcy that May and returned it to the air on August 1, 1967; Mountain changed the call letters to KBBV on May 12, 1975. KBBV was sold to Vernon E. Thompson in 1987.

In 1972, Mountain built an FM sister station, KTOT-FM 101.7 (now KXSB). The two stations remained co-owned until Lazer Broadcasting acquired the FM station in 1994.

=== In Loma Linda ===
KBBV filed to move to Loma Linda in 1996, being approved for the new site in 2000. Broadcast Management Services acquired the station in 1999 and rechristened it KCAA on May 17, 2001.

KCAA had carried programming from Air America Radio, one hour each per weekday of Al Franken and Randi Rhodes, from the time of its founding in 2004; it and KBLA were among the network's first affiliates. The programming disappeared during the winter of 2006-07 because of the limited daytime hours, and the Air America affiliation was completely dropped in April 2007. KCAA's most popular program was Imus in the Morning, which was played on a three-hour delay. At the time, it was the only outlet in Southern California to broadcast Imus' show. KCAA gained some notoriety when it began rebroadcasting recent episodes of the Imus program in the days immediately after it had been canceled by CBS Radio. However, CBS Radio sued KCAA, claiming that it had violated copyright restrictions. A settlement was reached between the two parties, when it was announced that the Imus reruns would end Friday, April 27. The station revealed that they were not selling advertising during the reruns.

By the time Imus returned to the air via ABC Radio/Citadel Broadcasting, local morning host Dennis Baxter, who had previously hosted the local news breaks during Imus, had established himself as the station's morning host. KCAA CEO Fred Lundgren considered bringing back Imus in a live time slot (03:00 to 06:00 on the West Coast), at the time held by Brother Stair) but found ABC's terms, which included rights fees, unacceptable, and refused to pick up the show again; Imus would air on KABC only until KCAA general manager Dennis Baxter inked a deal with ABC Radio/Citadel Broadcasting to bring Imus back to KCAA starting Thursday, September 1, 2008. As of 2017, KCAA only airs a small, delayed portion of the Imus program, one hour per day most weekdays.

On April 24, 2007, KCAA began broadcasting 24 hours per day. Prior to that date, the station operated as a daytime-only station. In March 2008, KCAA was granted a permit to increase power to 10,000 watts.

In 2008, the station added live play-by-play of the Inland Empire 66ers of San Bernardino, a team in the California League of Minor League Baseball. It debuted on KCAA on April 3, when the 66ers hosted the Visalia Oaks.

In 2015 and 2016, KCAA acquired two FM translators, K293CF (106.5 MHz) in San Bernardino and K272FQ (102.3 MHz) in Riverside County.

In September 2015, KCAA was one of five stations nominated as Station of the Year in the Riverside, San Bernardino, Ontario and Temecula radio market.

On July 15, 2017, KCAA relocated from the Carousel Mall, where it had been based since 2004, to its current Redlands studios as a result of the mall's closure.
