= Max Gottschalk =

American artist (1909–2005)

Max Jules Gottschalk (1909–2005) was an artist, furniture designer, and industrial designer.

== History ==
Gottschalk was born in 1909 in St. Louis, Missouri. He graduated from Washington University in St. Louis in the late 1930s.

=== Newfoundland ===
Afterwards, he moved to the Dominion of Newfoundland where he worked as Chief Technical Advisor of the Department of Agriculture and Rural Reconstruction. The Newfoundland government assigned him the task of designing workshop furniture for the agricultural community of Markland. His designs combined modernist principles with the use of natural materials. The onset World War II ended the government's economic reconstruction programs and Gottschalk's work.

=== Arizona ===
Gottschalk then returned to the United States, moving to Tucson, Arizona. He became a professor of industrial design at the new Modernist style West Campus of Pima Community College.

Gottschalk's most productive artistic period was in Arizona, from the 1950s to his death in 2005.

His artistic interests included mid-century modern industrial design which combined "natural" materials like leather with production materials such as aluminum and steel. The result was beautifully proportioned work that embraced and embodied both the Southwestern aesthetic and Modern design principles.

Gottschalk often worked with leather that was irregular and flawed, celebrating the material's imperfections. His distinctive logo appears on all of his products. He also created oil paintings.

== Gallery ==
Examples of Gottschalk's work include:

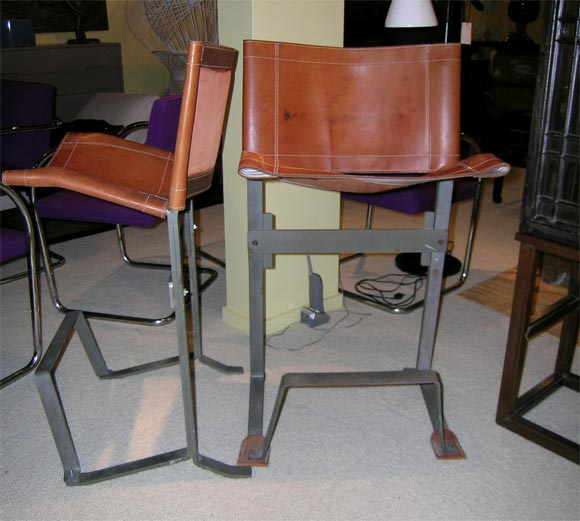
1970s Leather & Steel Chair – pair

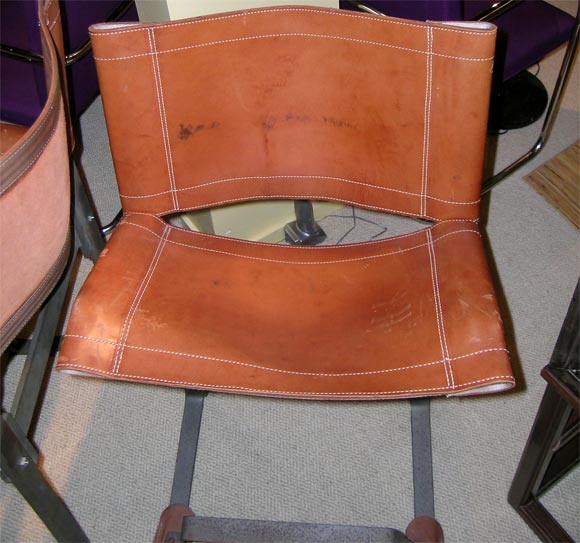
1970s Leather & Steel Chair – closeup

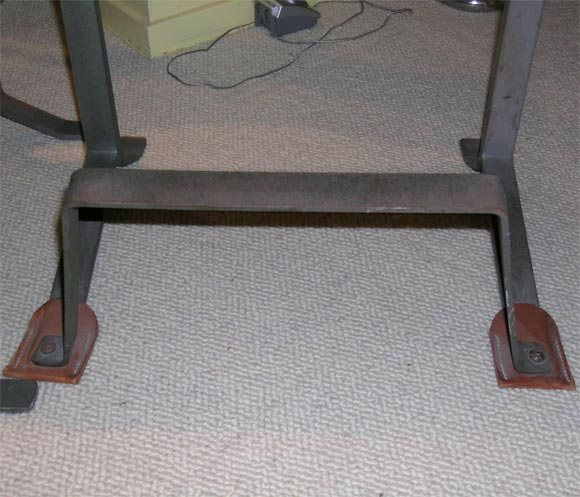
1970s Leather & Steel Chair – feet

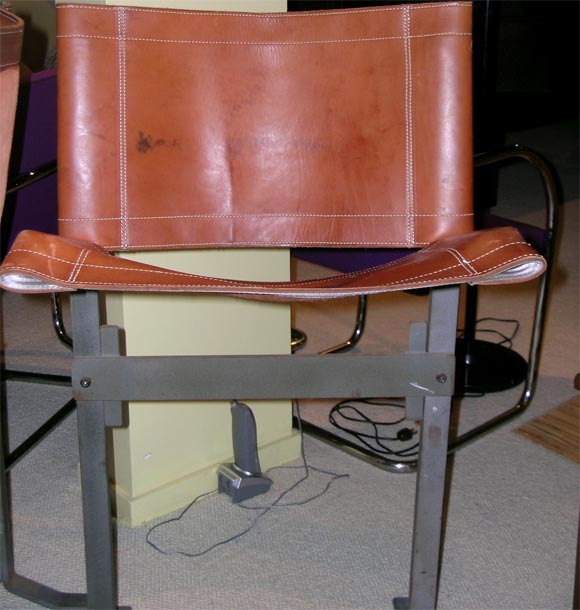
1970s Leather & Steel Chair – front

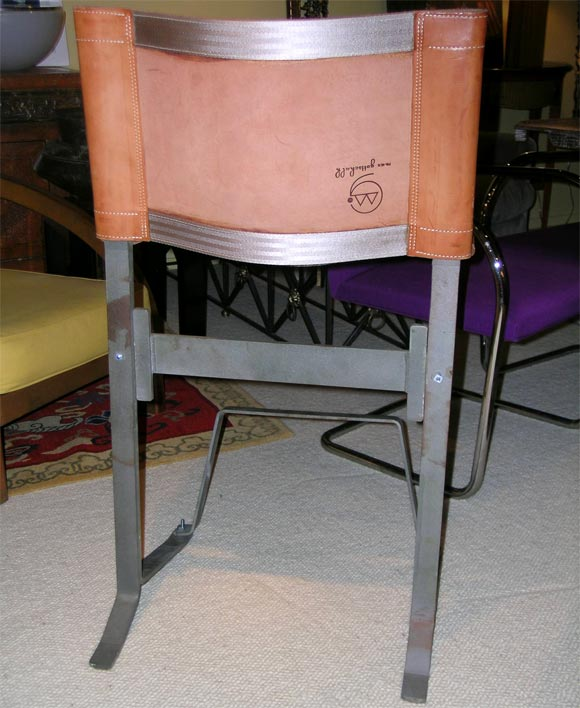
1970s Leather & Steel Chair – back w/logo

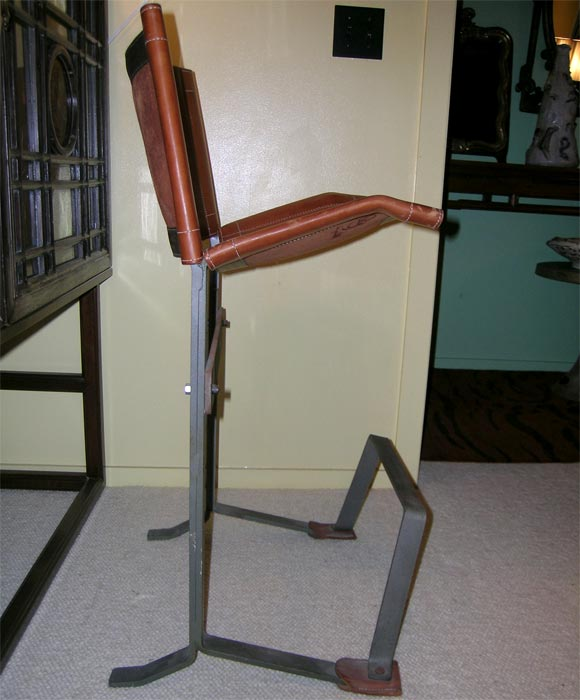
1970s Leather & Steel Chair – side

1960s era Barstool – Logo
1970s Leather & Aluminum Chair – Logo

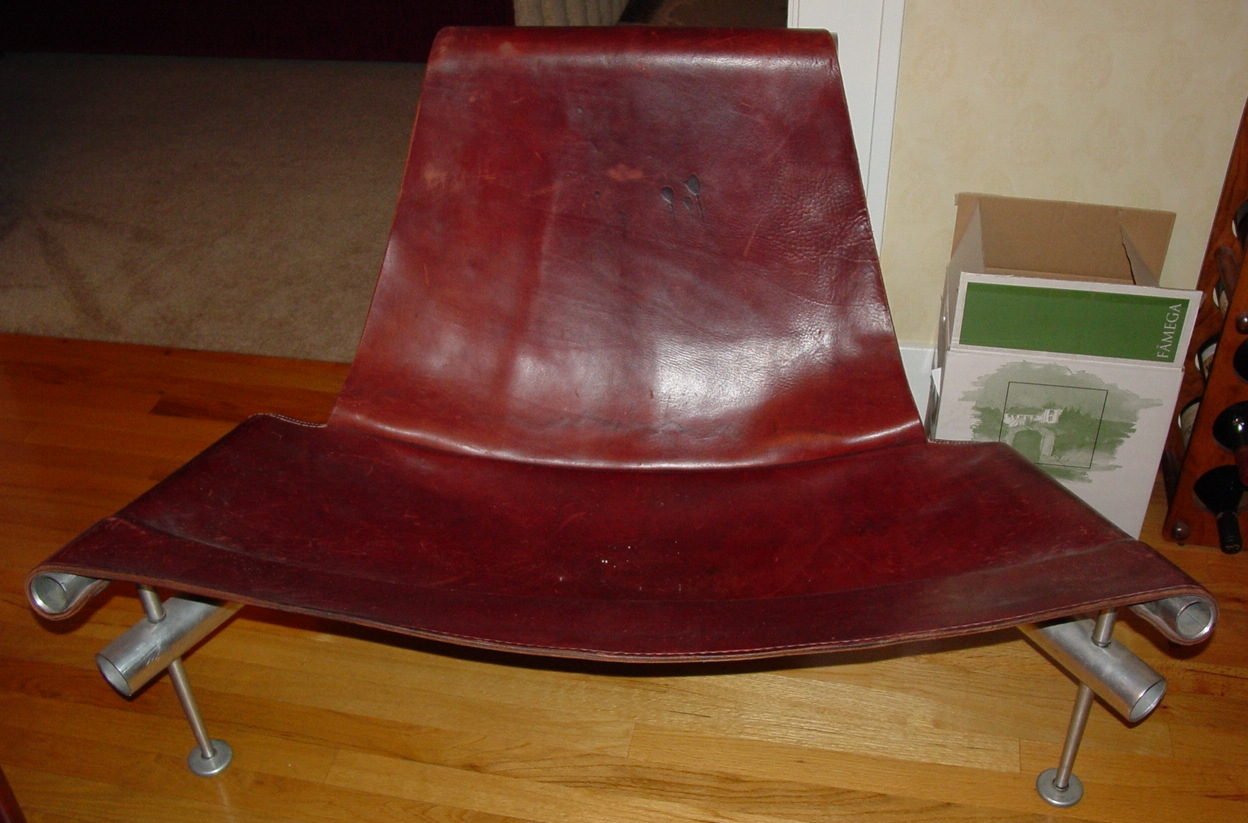
1970s Leather & Aluminum Chair – Front #1

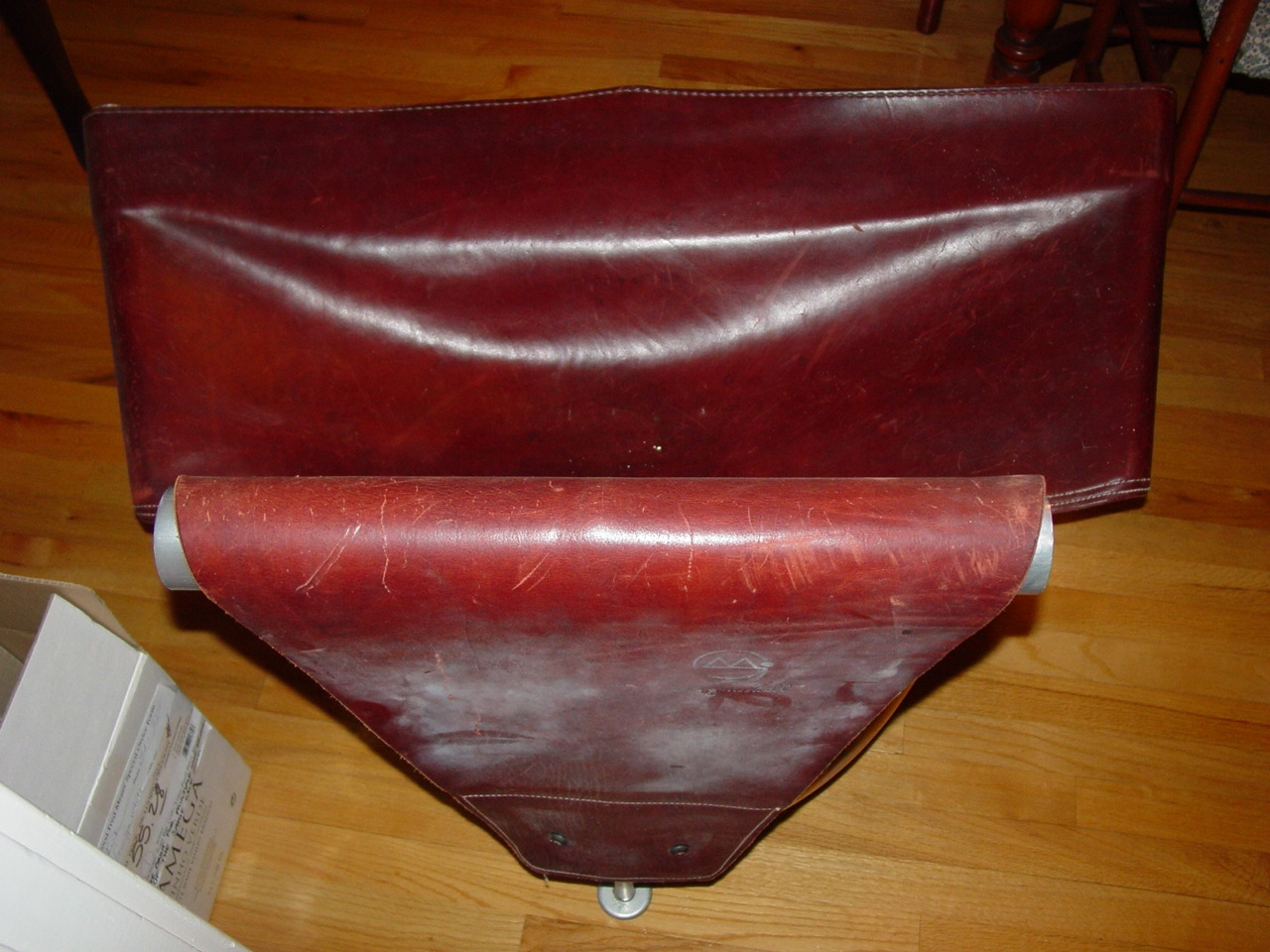
1970s Leather & Aluminum Chair – Top

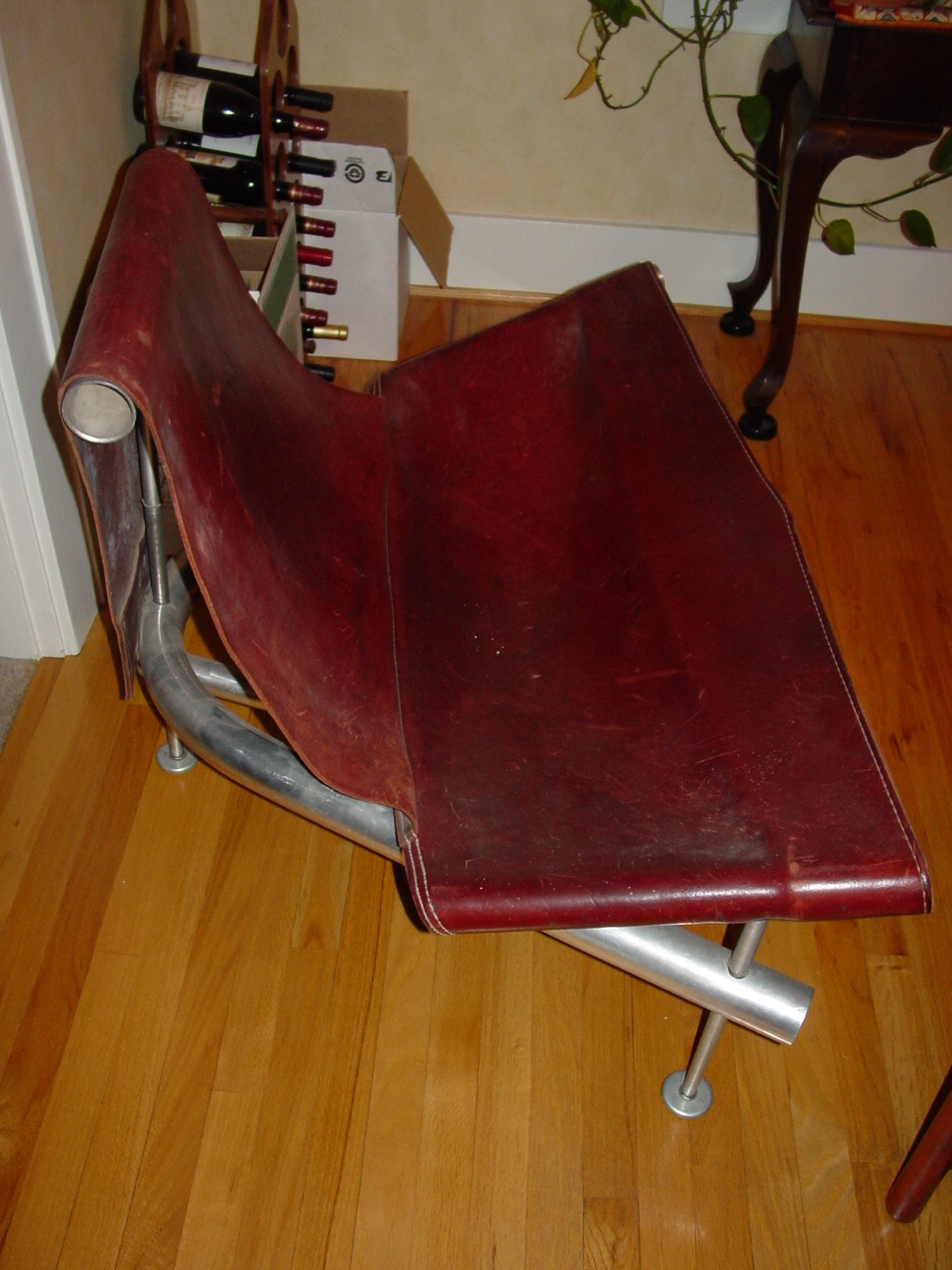
1970s Leather & Aluminum Chair – Side

== See also ==
- Gottschalks – Former American department store chain
