= Riverside Plaza (Riverside, California) =

Shopping center in Riverside, California, United States

Coordinates: 33.955341°N 117.390678°W

Riverside Plaza is a 475,000-square-foot (44,100 m^{2}) outdoor mall in Riverside, California originally anchored by a 205,000-square-foot (19,000 m^{2}) Harris Company (later Harris’/Gottschalks) department store along with Montgomery Ward. It was the city's first mall and was originally an outdoor mall, then remodeled to an enclosed indoor mall, and then remodeled back to an outdoor mall.

After a $12-million renovation in the early 2010s, the center features walkways, fountains, decorative lights and courtyard seats. Today it is anchored by a Regal Cinemas, Forever 21, Trader Joe's, Marshalls, JoAnn Fabrics & Crafts and Nordstrom Rack.

Forever 21 opened first in the empty Harris’/Gottschalks building space, but relocated in 2013 to a space that Borders Books vacated.
