= Harris Company =

Former department store chain based in San Bernardino, CA

The Harris Company
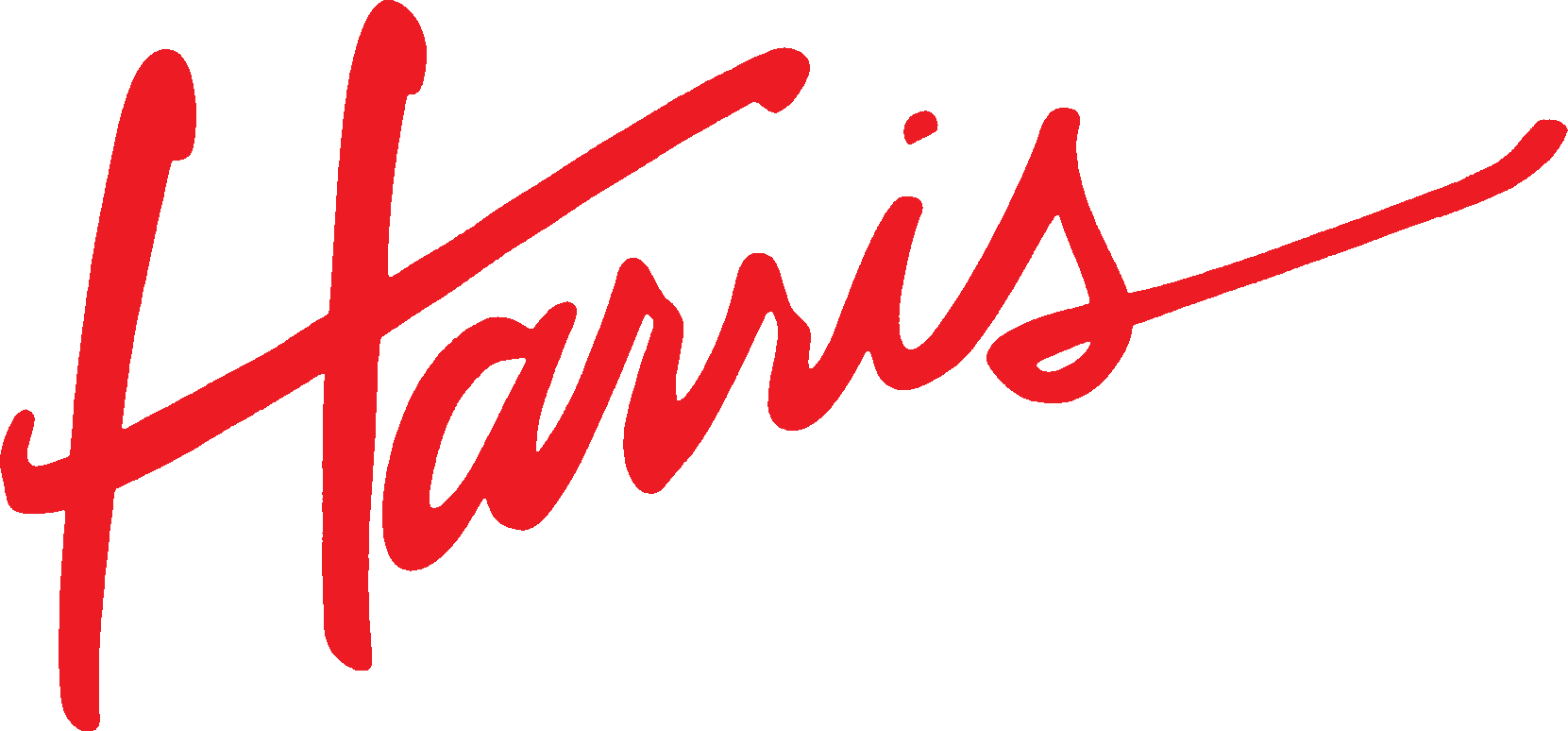
- Type: Department store
- Industry: Retail
- Founded: 1905
- Defunct: 1998
- Fate: Merged, became Harris-Gottschalks
- Headquarters: San Bernardino, California
- Products: Clothing, footwear, bedding, furniture, jewelry, beauty products, handbags and housewares

The Harris Company was a retail corporation, based in San Bernardino, California, that operated a chain of department stores named Harris', all in Southern California. Philip, Arthur, and Herman Harris – nephews of founder Leopold Harris of what was once the large Los Angeles–based chain Harris & Frank – started the company with a small dry goods store in 1905, and the company eventually grew to nine large department stores, with stores in San Bernardino, Riverside, and Kern Counties.

The chain was acquired by Fresno, California–based Gottschalks in 1998. After the acquisition some of the stores continued to operate under the name Harris Gottschalks. In January, 2009, Gottschalks filed for bankruptcy, and on March 31 announced they were liquidating all stores. All of the original Harris stores that were still operating, were finally closed in July, 2009.

== History ==
1991

stair detail, 1991

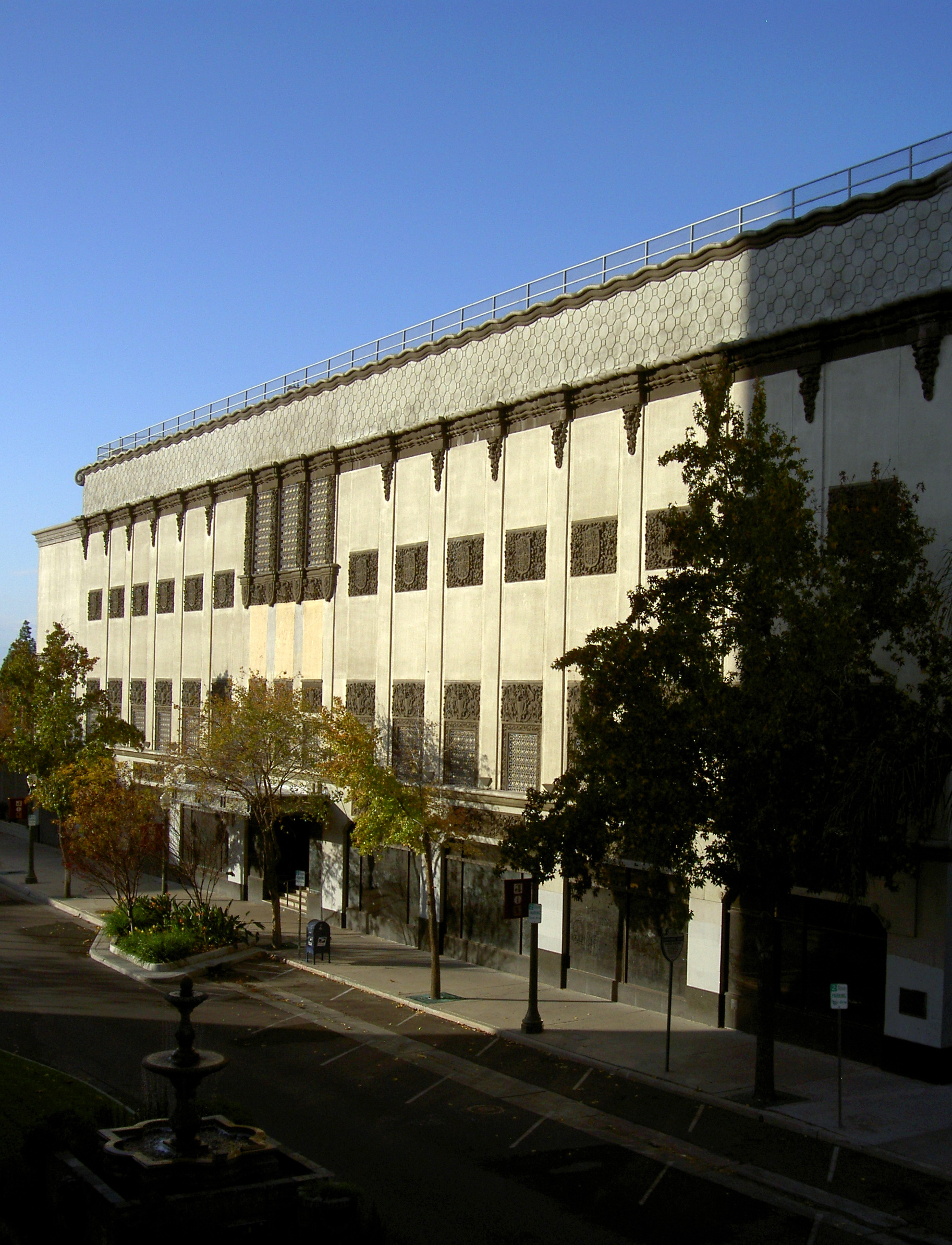
Harris Company building, San Bernardino

=== Origins ===
Philip, Arthur, and Herman Harris were nephews of Leopold Harris, founder of what was once the large Los Angeles–based chain Harris & Frank; and Philip and Herman had worked there. The three brothers started Harris Company with a small dry goods store in 1905 in the ground floor of the Armory Building at 462 Third Street, between D and E Streets, with a storefront only 25 foot (7.6 m) wide.

Philip and Herman closed their White House store at 103 W. 4th Street in Santa Ana and brought the stock to San Bernardino. Arthur Harris joined in 1906, after having worked in his brother-in-law's store in Anaheim. With $2,500 of Arthur's money, Harris Co. moved across the street. The Harris brothers hired a window trimmer and a dozen employees, and became the most stylish store in town. In 1907, they opened a second floor to house Millinery and Ready-to-Wear. In 1907, they added what was the first elevator in San Bernardino. They opened a branch in Colton, without success, and in 1908, a branch in Redlands, which was successful. By 1915, the flagship store had annexed what was the Cartwright's Dry Goods building, as well as a clothing store.

=== Flagship ===
By 1919 they started to buy land at 3rd and E to build a new, larger store, which launched on November 7, 1927, with three floors plus a mezzanine, basement and roof garden. There was a tea room, lunch counter, beauty parlor, barber shop, sit-down soda fountain, candies, stationery, grocery store called Sage's Market, and a restaurant, Café Madrid. The main entrance archway fitted with Italian marble rose 29 feet, while the interior lobby ceiling was an impressive 32 feet high; the doors were made of hammered copper. The outside face of the building had alternating intricate stone and wrought iron ornamental grillwork, with the Harris coat-of-arms molded into the stonework. The San Bernardino Sun wrote: Towns do not have department stores. The Inland Empire has arrived."

=== 1930s–1970s ===
The company survived the Depression by carefully managing costs and business relationships. Through the 1940s and 1950s, the store was famous for its animated Christmas window displays on E Street and its Santa Claus. In 1947, the store added the first escalator (then called a "motorstair") in the Inland Empire. Harris continued to expand their San Bernardino and Redlands stores and opened a branch at Riverside Plaza on September 30, 1957.

With suburbanization, San Bernardino sought to revitalize its downtown. In the late 1960s and early 1970s, due to the Central City redevelopment program, structural changes were carried out at the flagship in the name of modernization and it became an anchor store of the new Central City Mall.

=== 1980s–2009 ===
In 1981, Spanish retailer El Corte Inglés, S.A. acquired the Harris Company and its nine stores which included Bakersfield, Hemet, Indio, Moreno Valley, Palmdale, Redlands, Riverside, San Bernardino and Victorville. In 1997, the Harris Company invested $27 million (~$48.9 million in 2024) to update its nine-store chain.

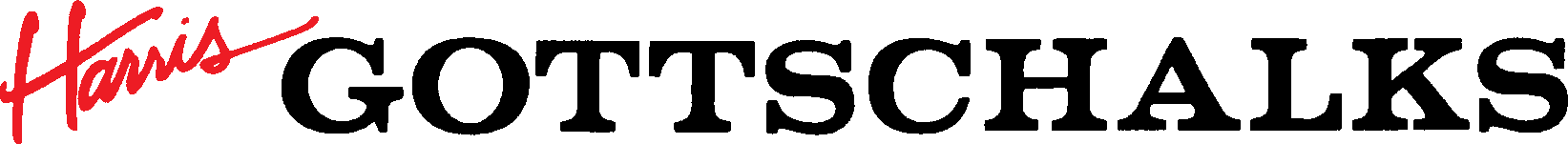
Harris-Gottschalks logo

The Harris Company was acquired by Gottschalks in 1998, and the stores were initially renamed Harris-Gottschalks. Most of the original Harris stores eventually dropped the name Harris, except the Bakersfield, Indio and Moreno Valley locations, which continued to operate under the Harris-Gottschalks name. The original flagship store in downtown San Bernardino closed on January 31, 1999. After the downtown San Bernardino store closed, the Riverside store became the largest store in the chain at 204,000 square feet.

On January 14, 2009, Gottschalks filed for Chapter 11 bankruptcy. In March 2009, Gottschalks announced that it had lined up a group of bidders to liquidate the chain, if a buyer was not found by March 30. On March 31, Gottschalks announced it would liquidate its remaining stores, and on July 12, 2009 all of the Gottschalks stores were closed.

== Holiday seasons ==
The original Harris Company store in downtown San Bernardino and adjacent to Carousel Mall is still remembered today for its magnificent Christmas and Easter promotional displays. The family likewise provided lavish holiday decor for its Riverside store and later others, including creative, automated window displays, which became a local tradition for shoppers. This continued until 1998, long after most other stores cut back on lavish displays.

== Store locations ==
Located on E Street in downtown San Bernardino, the original Harris Company building was abandoned in 1999, before it was largely destroyed by two separate fires in 2024.

The largest location in the former Harris chain was the 204,000-square-foot (19,000 m^{2}) location at the Riverside Plaza in Riverside, California. This store was also the largest store in the Gottschalks chain. The store was purchased by clothing retailer Forever 21 which opened a new large-format store at the site in August, 2009. The former Riverside Harris' was renovated in 2014 after the closure of Forever 21 in early 2013. It is now occupied by Nordstrom Rack, Marshalls, and Jo-Ann Fabrics

Table of store locations:

City	Mall or address	Opening date	Sq. ft. at opening	Closing date	Current building use	Notes
Antelope Valley	Antelope Valley Mall	1990		2009	Dick's Sporting Goods	
Bakersfield	East Hills Mall	1990		2009	Demolished	
Hemet	Hemet Valley Mall	1980		2009	Hobby Lobby	
Indio	Indio Fashion Mall	2/24/1975	60,000			
Moreno Valley	Moreno Valley Mall	1992		2009		
Palm Springs	Palm Springs Mall	orig. Walker Scott (1970)				Existing Gottschalks (formerly Walker Scott, later Buffums), became Harris-Gottschalks
Redlands	17 East State Street	1915		1970s		
Redlands	Redlands Mall	1977		2009		
Riverside	Riverside Plaza	9/30/1957	205,000	July 2009	Jo-Ann Stores, Marshalls, Nordstrom Rack	
San Bernardino	Third and E Streets	1927	250,000 sq. ft. after renovation	1999		Flagship store
San Bernardino	Carousel Mall	1972		1999	Demolished	
San Bernardino	Inland Center	1995 (originally May Company)		2009	JCPenney	Existing Gottschalks, became Harris-Gottschalks
Victorville	The Mall of Victor Valley	1987		2008	Macy's	

== See also ==
- Gottschalks
