= Park Lane Mall =

Reno Experience District
- Location: Reno, Nevada, U.S.
- Coordinates: 39.503758°N 119.800357°W
- Address: Plumb Lane at South Virginia Street
- Opened: March 9, 1967; (as Park Lane Centre); November 6, 2021; (as Reno Experience District)
- Closed: January 31, 2007 (as Park Lane Mall)
- Previous names: Park Lane Centre (1967–1979); Park Lane Mall (1979–2007)
- Developer: Ben Edwards and A. J. Flagg; (Park Lane Centre); Lyon Living; (Reno Experience District)
- Num. of stores: 8
- Num. of anchor tenants: 1
- Floor area: 550,000 square feet (51,000 m^{2}) (as Park Lane Mall)
- Floors: 1
- Website: https://redreno.com/

Reno Experience District (or RED), originally Park Lane Centre and later Park Lane Mall, is a mixed-use entertainment, retail, and residential complex in Reno, Nevada, United States, located at the southeast corner of South Virginia Street and Plumb Lane, just west of the Reno–Tahoe International Airport and south of downtown Reno.

The property was an enclosed shopping mall known as Park Lane, was closed in 2007 after the mall went into a decline, and was demolished the same year. It was last anchored by Gottschalks, which has since closed and gone out of business, and Century Theatres, which is one of a few remaining businesses from the old mall still operating.

== History ==
Construction of Park Lane Centre commenced on November 5, 1964 with Victor Gruen Associates and Charles Luckman Associates as the original architects. The mall opened on March 9, 1967 with 23 stores, joining a pre-existing Sears store built two years earlier in 1965. It cost $10 million ($102.2 million today) to build and opened in phases from 1965 to 1967 as an open-air mall with 600,000 square feet (56,000 m^{2}) of gross leasable area. The original anchors were:

Full-line department stores:

- Sears, opened in 1965 before the rest of the mall at 150,000 square feet (14,000 m^{2}), three times the size of its prior store in Downtown Reno
- Weinstock's, opened in the summer of 1967 (not part of the 23 stores that opened in March 1967) at 150,000 square feet (14,000 m^{2}) over three floors, air-conditioned, and decorated in Portuguese marble at ground level

Specialty department stores:

- Roos/Atkins, a San Francisco-based clothing retailer with roots in Virginia City, Nevada (21,000 square feet (2,000 m^{2}), closed 1981)
- Joseph Magnin, (21,000 square feet (2,000 m^{2}), opened early in November 1966)

As it grew, Park Lane Centre became the Reno area's dominant shopping mall. The mall was purchased by Macerich in 1979 and the mall received major updates, including enclosing the mall and renaming the property to Park Lane Mall.

By the mid-1990s, Park Lane started to gradually decline. Joseph Magnin had since closed, Sears moved to Meadowood Mall in 1995, and Weinstock's closed in 1996 after Federated Department Stores (now Macy's, Inc.) acquired Weinstock's parent company Broadway Stores a year prior, and had the store shuttered rather than converting it into a Macy's. Park Lane's competitor Meadowood Mall, which is about 3 miles (4.8 km) to the south and more than double its size, had taken over as the city's most dominant shopping mall. Attempts to revive Park Lane included adding a Gottschalks department store at the old Sears in 1996 and a new Century Theatres movie theater in 1998 (which involved demolishing the former Weinstock's building), but the mall continued to decline into the 2000s until the mall ultimately closed in January 2007. Park Lane was demolished in the fall that same year, leaving Gottschalks, Century Theatres, a three-story Colonial Bank (now Heritage Bank of Nevada) along South Virginia Street, and a Wells Fargo Bank on the northeast corner of the property along Plumb Lane still standing. Gottschalks closed in late 2008, shortly before the company went into bankruptcy and liquidated its remaining stores, eventually being demolished soon thereafter.

In 2016, Reno Land bought the land Park Lane used to sit on after the Great Recession left the property sitting vacant for several years.

The site is now being redeveloped into a new mixed-use project that is slated to have a mix of 1,300 luxury apartments, a 170-room hotel, more than 70,000 square feet (6,500 m^{2}) of retail space, a market hall with a coworking loft, a tech campus of 382,000 square feet (35,500 m^{2}), and a 1-acre (0.40 ha) park. Construction of the property commenced in 2019 and in 2020 was renamed to its current moniker, the Reno Experience District, ending the legacy Park Lane name. The complex officially opened to the public on November 6, 2021.

As of 2025, the site today includes the aforementioned Century Theatres and the adjoining 1-acre (0.40 ha) park, three luxury apartment complexes, a Kasa Archive hotel, an Element by Westin hotel, and two outparcels unaffected by the former mall's demolition in 2007: Heritage Bank of Nevada and Wells Fargo. A significant portion of the property remains undeveloped.
