= Jacoby Bros. =

Department store

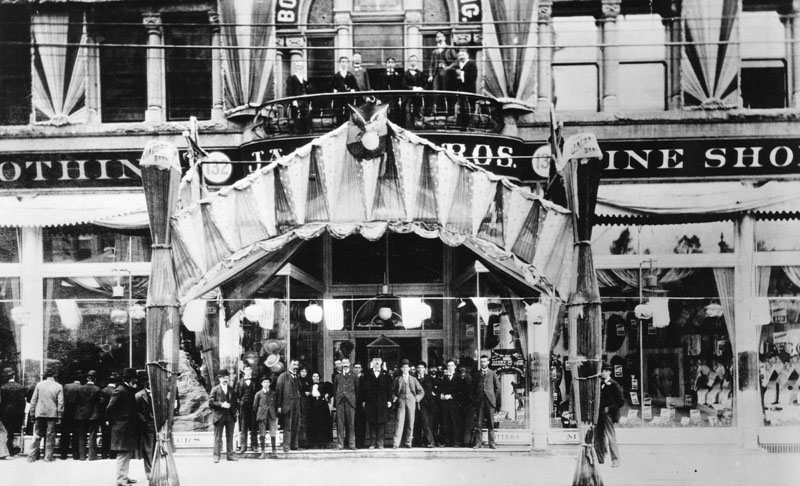
Jacoby Bros. store at 128–134 N. Spring Street, around 1896

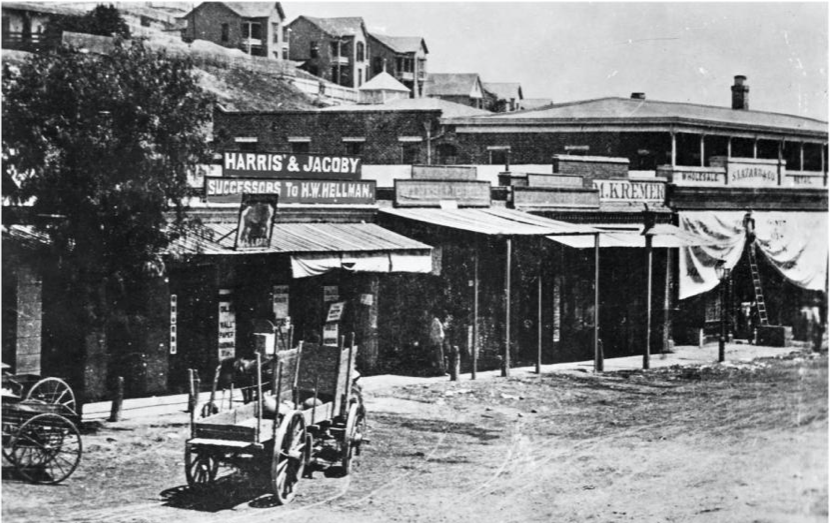
The Jacobys' first store: "Harris & Jacoby, successors to H. W. Hellman", and forerunners to both Harris & Frank and Jacoby Bros., in the Old Downey Block around 1870. M. Kremer is also nearby, forerunner of the City of Paris department store

Jacoby Bros. (late 1930s, Jacoby's) was one of Los Angeles' largest dry goods retailers in the 1880s and 1890s, developing over the decades into a department store, which closed in the late 1930s.

In 1870, Isaac, Nathan, Charles, Abraham, and Lessor Jacoby had joined with him and Leopold Harris in buying out Herman W. Hellman's store, to form Harris & Jacoby. The Jacoby brothers, Leopold Harris and Harris Newmark all came from the same town of Löbau, West Prussia (later part of the German Empire, now Lubawa, Poland). The Jacoby's sold clothing, home furnishings, boots, shoes, hats, et al., both wholesale and retail.

In February, 1878, Loewenstein sold his business at in the Downey Block, 63 N. Main St. (post-1890 numbering: 163 N. Main), on the west side of Main, just north of Temple, opposite Commercial Street, to Lessor Jacoby and "Jacoby's Clothing House" started business there later that year.

== Temple Block stores (1879-1891) ==
From 1879, the store (first promoting itself as "L. Jacoby", then "Jacoby Bros." was located at 103 N. Main (pre-1890 numbering) in the County Bank Building of the Temple Block, which then became the separate Jacoby Bros.' Philadelphia Shoe Store, while the Jacoby Bros. ' Retail Clothing House opened in storefronts just south, still in Temple Block, at 121-127 N. Main St. (post-1890 numbering: 221-227 N. Main St.) advertised as such through March 1891, and then simply as Jacoby Bros, through August 1891.

From Feb 1891 the Philadelphia Shoe House was advertised at 128-130 N. Spring St. (post-1890 numbering). In May, 1891, the Shoe House moved to 215 N. Spring St. three doors north of the City of Paris department store. This was so that Jacoby Bros. could level it as well as the adjacent storefronts at 132-134 N. Spring, and build in its place a new, palatial store encompassing 128 through 134 Spring St.

== New store at 128-134 Spring Street (1891-1900) ==
On November 14, 1891, Jacoby Bros. held the grand opening of its new store at 128-134 Spring Street in the Larronde Block (building) with a connected wholesale department at 125 N. Main St. The building itself was praised as "handsome architecturally", a "rare combination of pressed brick, terra cotta and Sespe sandstone, with graceful columns and arches, a great arch over the central balcony flowing with streamers, beautiful signs and other ornamental features". The show windows were impressive for the time, two were 12 feet long and one was 22 feet long., all being 8 feet deep. There were two 12-foot-wide entrances with tiled vestibules and polished white marble steps. The ground floor retail space measured 9,800 square feet (910 m^{2}), while an equal amount of space in the basement was dedicated to wholesale boots and shoes, and an equal space on the second floor to wholesale clothing and hats. It incorporated new concepts such as having a single open selling space per floor, with much natural light, rather than walled off departments. The separate Philadelphia Shoe House closed.

In August 1896, Jacoby Bros. added the premises vacated by H. Jevne grocers at 136-138 N. Spring, and thus occupied all of 128 through 138 N. Spring St. through February 1900.

== Broadway store (1900) ==
In 1900, Jacoby Bros. moved, as did many other upscale retailers, west to Broadway and south to 331-333-335 S. Broadway. The new store was a project of Homer Laughlin and the architect was John B. Parkinson. It opened on March 3, 1900 and had four stories plus a basement, 60,000 square feet (5,600 m^{2}) of selling space, a sixty-foot frontage and two elevators. The second floor featured men's clothing, the third floor, ladies', and the fourth floor attended the wholesale business. The store boasted that a 25-by-40-foot center court allowed light to permeate the store, and that its 13,125 sq ft (1,219.4 m^{2}) basement shoe department was the largest in the Western United States and three times as large as any other shoe store in the city. The store was exclusive retailer for clothing by Hackett, Carhart & Co.

The building remains with only two stories, and in 1979, when the Broadway Theater and Commercial District was added to the National Register of Historic Places, Jacoby Brothers Building was listed as a non-contributing property in the district.

== Hiatus (1935–6) ==
For a brief period around 1935–6, the company's advertisements dropped the "Bros." and advertised as Jacoby's.

Around May of 1935, Jacoby Bros. liquidated its store at 331–335 S. Broadway. They were unable to renew their lease, and sold their stock to the May Company. A Los Angeles-based Boston Store (not the Inglewood-based Boston Store, which would become a large chain) occupied the premises in the late 1930s.

== 6th & Broadway store (1936–8) ==
The concern reopened in February 1936 at the H. Jevne & Co. Building, 605 S. Broadway, at the southwest corner of Sixth Street. However, only two years later in 1938, Jacoby's went out of business.

In 1940, retailer Zukor's leased the majority of the premises. The Zukor's sign is still visible on the portion of the building that it occupied.

== Notes ==
1Several sources from the 1920s-1930s state that the Jacoby's opened their first store in Wilmington in 1875, and then in Los Angeles in 1877. However, photographic evidence in Wilson's book contradicts this, showing Harris & Jacoby in the Old Downey Block which was torn down in c. 1870. Also, advertisements for seeds sold at the Hellman store at No. 2 Downey Block, Los Angeles, cease in January 1870 while an ad for the Harris & Jacoby store at No. 2, Downey Block, started appearing in the same newspaper in December 1870. It is currently difficult to establish the exact date in 1870 that the business changed hands from Hellman to Jacoby, as online archives for Los Angeles newspapers have a gap between the 1864 (for the Star) and 1873 (when the Herald archives commence). Jacoby Bros. themselves, in advertising in 1900, referred to a start date for their business of 1867.
