= Gottschalks =

Former American department store chain

Gottschalks, Inc.
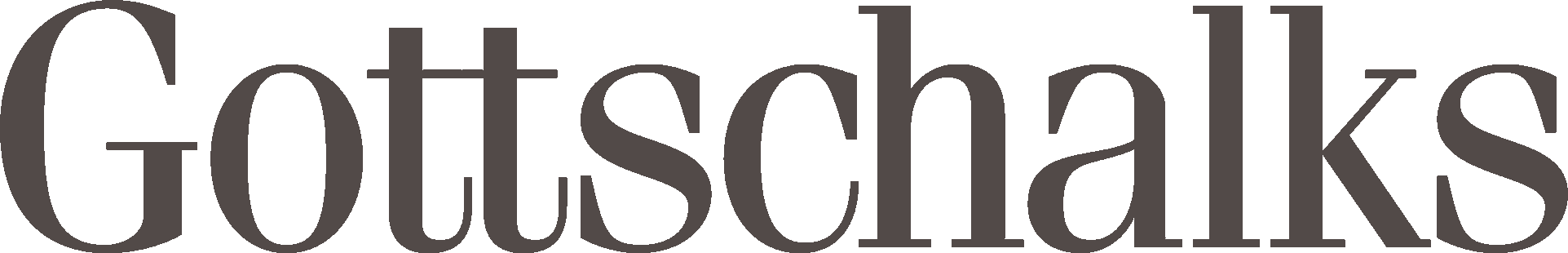
- Company type: Public
- Industry: Retail
- Founded: 1904
- Defunct: July 12, 2009
- Fate: Bankruptcy and liquidation sale
- Headquarters: Fresno, California
- Products: Clothing, footwear, beauty products, jewelry, rugs, furniture, bedding, bath, appliances, and housewares

Gottschalks (former NYSE ticker symbol GOT) was a middle-tier American department store that operated 58 department stores and three specialty apparel stores in six western states (California, Washington, Alaska, Idaho, Oregon, and Nevada); some locations ran as Harris-Gottschalks stores. Prior to liquidation, it was the largest independently owned, publicly traded department store chain in the United States. On January 14, 2009, Gottschalks filed for Chapter 11 bankruptcy. This bankruptcy became a liquidation on March 31, 2009. At least five prime locations became Macy's stores, while several more became Forever 21 stores.

== Beginnings ==
The second Gottschalks logo used until 2001.

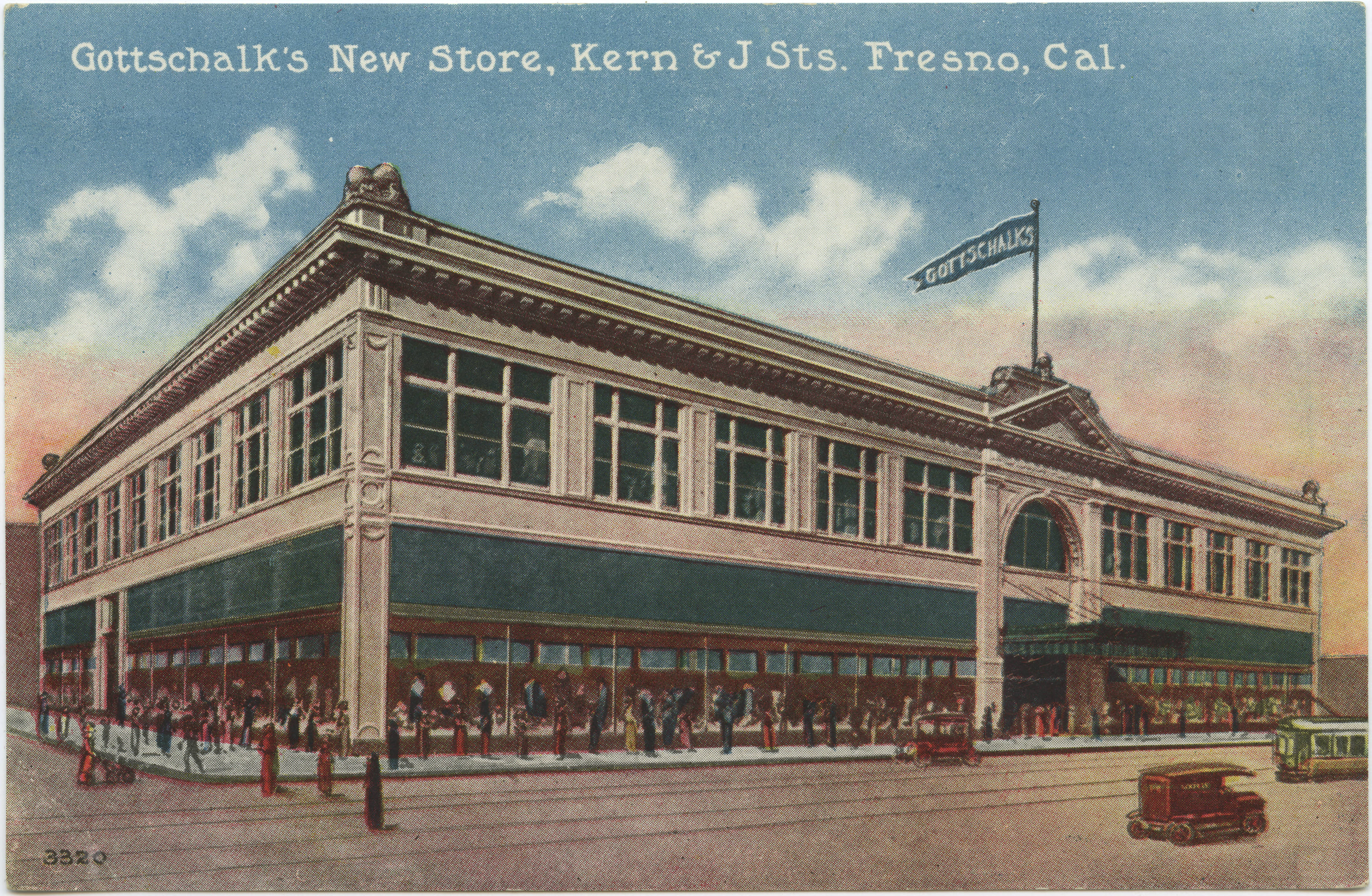
Gottschalk's new, larger store in Fresno, CA, shortly after it opened in 1914

Gottschalks was founded by German Jewish immigrant Emil Gottschalk in 1904 as a dry goods store in downtown Fresno, California. Ten years later, the store grew enough to move into another building downtown with ten times the amount of space. Before his passing in 1939, Emil passed control to his brother-in-law, Henry Korn and his nephew, Abe Blum. The company opened its first branch store in Merced in 1961 and new stores in Visalia and Fresno. In a strategy to win over teenage baby-boomers, Gottschalks launched Bobbie West, a chain of junior apparel stores, in the late 1960s. Village East shops, which offered plus-sized women's clothing, were launched in 1970.

Irving (Bill) Levy served as the 4th of seven presidents in the 105 years that Gottschalks operated. Upon Irving Levy's death in 1981, his son Joseph Levy became CEO and chairman of the board until James Famalette was elevated to these positions in 1999 and 2007, respectively.

== Becoming successful ==
Gottschalks gained success by locating only in smaller cities that could not support full-size national department stores. This tactic kept Gottschalks' overhead low by allowing it to build smaller (80,000- to 110,000-square-foot), single-level stores with lower real estate costs. More often than not, it also made Gottschalks "the only game in town", with virtually no competition from other national department stores.

The chief executives of Gottschalks, Inc. following the death of Emil Gottschalk:

1. Henry Korn (brother in law)
2. Abe Blum (sole nephew)
3. Irving Levy (wife's nephew by marriage)
4. Joseph Levy (son of Irving Levy)
5. James Famalette (no relation)

Presidents/chief operating officers who served after Irving Levy's death in 1981:

1. Gerald Blum (grand nephew and son of Abe Blum)
2. Stephen Furst (no relation)
3. James Famalette (no relation)

Abe Blum (died 1963) had a degree in electrical engineering from Rutgers University,- and was responsible for installing one of Fresno's first air conditioning systems and was among the first retailers in the area to accept bank credit cards. According to a 1977 Chain Store Age Executive article, in 1976 Gottschalks became America's first department store to totally automate sales transactions. The company installed electronic point of sale (POS) "wands" that read bar codes and store credit cards. This technology helped increase efficiency, reduce errors, and keep inventory and customer billing up to date.

== Expansion ==
The number of Gottschalks units doubled from nine in 1985 to 18 in 1988 and annual revenues increased from $112 million to $196 million in the process. Part of this growth came via the acquisition of two small family-run department store chains in 1987 and 1988, for a total of $11 million.

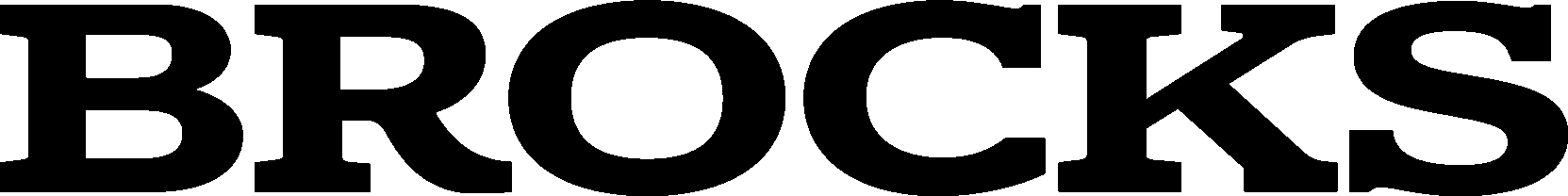
Brock's department store logo

Brock's (Malcolm Brock and Co.) stores and 500 employees were added in Bakersfield, the Downtown flagship and in the Valley Plaza Mall.

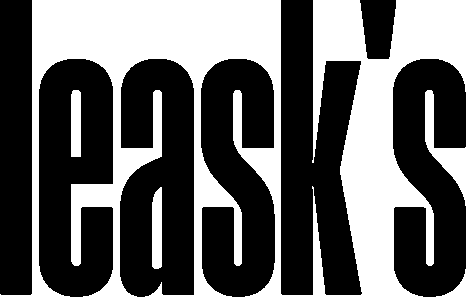
Leask's department store logo

The acquisition of Samuel Leask & Sons chains added three stores and 150 employees, in:

- Santa Cruz, 80,000 square feet (7,400 m^{2})
- Scotts Valley 11,000 square feet (1,000 m^{2})
- Aptos, 9,000 square feet (840 m^{2})
- a store to be built in the Capitola Mall in Capitola

The chain also refined its specialty store offerings, converting its Bobbie West juniors stores into Petites West boutiques mid-decade in order to attract smaller-sized Asian and Latin women.

The company's stock started trading on the New York Stock Exchange in 1986 under the symbol GOT. In 1988, the company closed its flagship store in Fresno, California due to unsatisfactory sales.

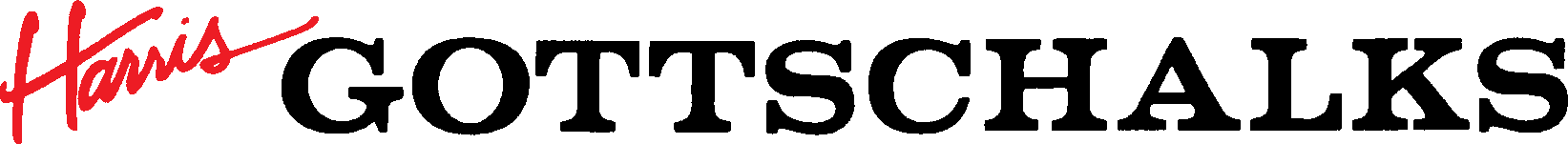
Harris-Gottschalks logo

In 1995, the company went online. In 1996, they opened a 125,000-square-foot (11,600 m^{2}) store in the troubled Park Lane Centre in Reno, Nevada, which had lost its two department store anchors Sears and Weinstock's to a larger competitor mall. The company grew in Southern California with the 1998 acquisition of Harris Department Stores, which operated as Harris-Gottschalks stores by then. In 2000, the Seattle based department store Lamonts was acquired.

== Decline after 2000 ==
Most of the Lamonts locations that were acquired by Gottschalks eventually closed due to poor sales. The exception was the Alaska market, where sales were strong and only one store, Wasilla, was closed prior to the company's shutdown. Closures included the locations at the Northgate Mall in Seattle, WA, in September 2006, and in Tacoma Highlands on September 22, 2007, a free-standing location unlike the typical mall setting. The Northgate Mall location marked the closing of the last Gottschalks in Seattle. In Washington state, the remaining Gottschalks locations had succeeded in rural and suburban areas with less competition from other department stores.

== Bankruptcy and liquidation ==
On October 24, 2008, Gottschalks was delisted from the New York Stock Exchange. NYSE officials stated that the value of the stock was too low to continue to be listed, and that its average global market capitalization had remained below $25 million for 30 straight trading days. Company officials claimed to be negotiating a deal for a loan with a Chinese company, Everbright Development Overseas Limited. They also stated that they would appeal the delisting decision. On December 18, 2008, Gottschalks officials announced that Everbright had pulled out of the deal.

On January 14, 2009, Gottschalks filed for Chapter 11 bankruptcy. In March 2009, Gottschalks announced it lined up a group of bidders that would liquidate the chain if no other bidder was found by March 30. On March 31, Gottschalks announced it would liquidate its remaining stores. The chain's final stores closed July 12, 2009. Several prime locations became Macy's or Forever 21.

There were plans by former CEO Joe Levy to reopen some of the stores by early 2011, but those plans ultimately fell through.

== Gallery ==
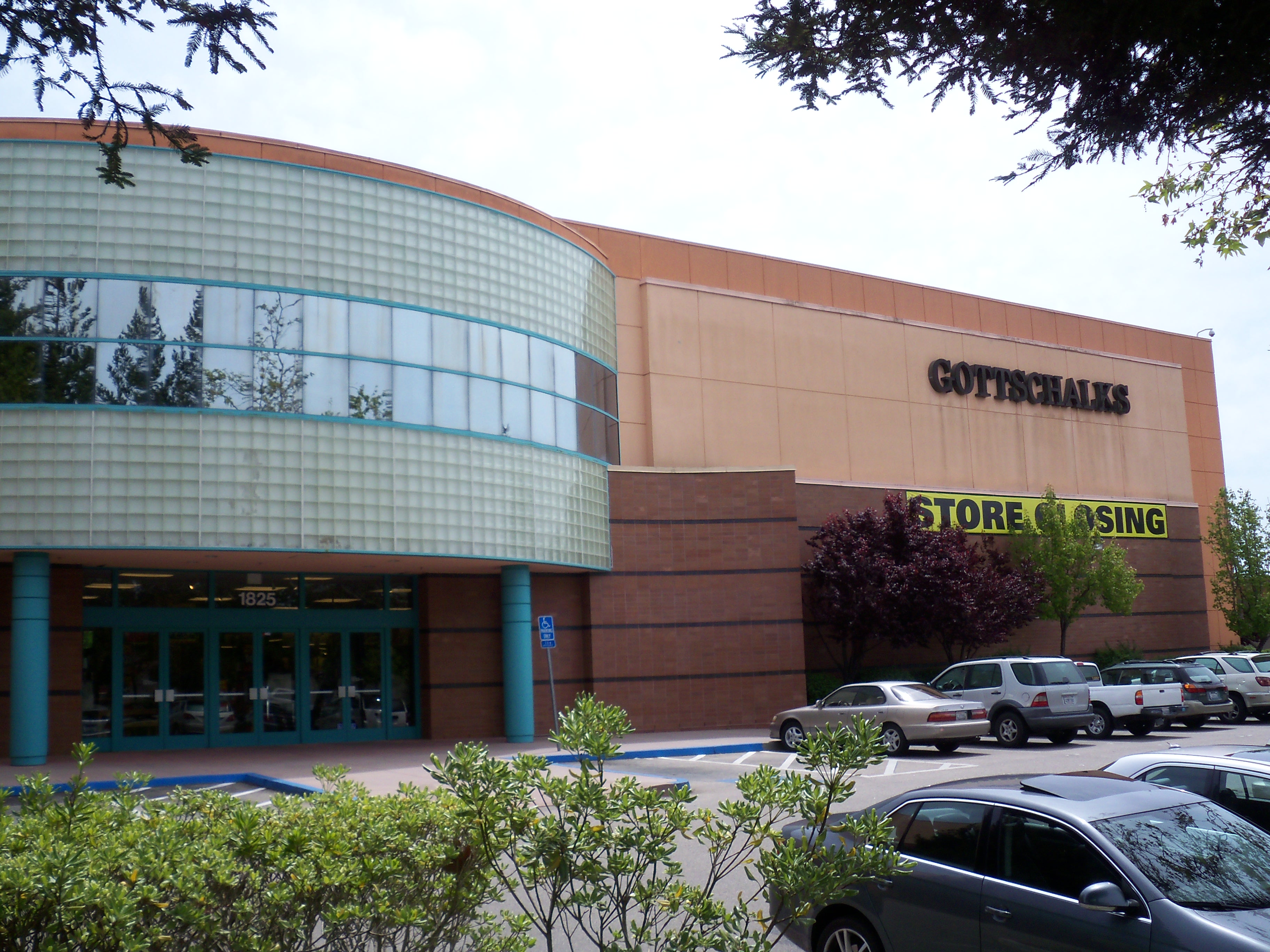
Store closing sale at Gottschalks in Capitola, California.

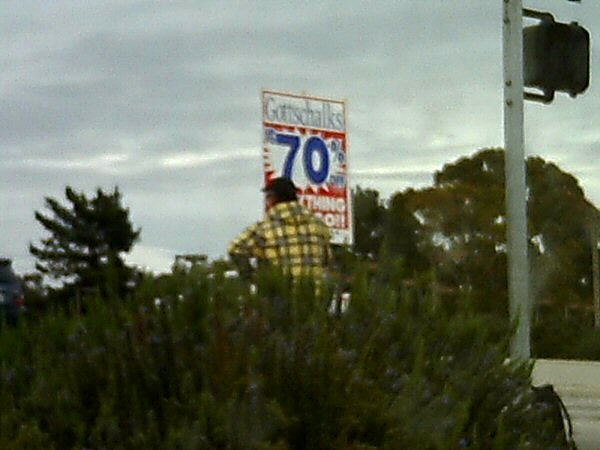
A sign spinner hired for the closing sale in Capitola, California.

== See also ==
- Max Gottschalk – American artist (1909–2005)
