= Prix Blumenthal =

- Awarded for: To aid young French artists financially, and draw the United States and France closer together
- Presented by: Fondation franco-américaine Florence Blumenthal
- First award: 1919
- Final award: 1950s?

The Prix Blumenthal (or Blumenthal Prize) was a grant or stipend awarded through the philanthropy of Florence Meyer Blumenthal (1875–1930) – and the foundation she created, Fondation franco-américaine Florence Blumenthal (Franco-American Florence Blumenthal Foundation) – to discover young French artists, aid them financially, and in the process draw the United States and France closer together through the arts.

Winners were designated by seven juries in the fields of the literature, painting, sculpture, decorative arts, structure, engraving and music – to receive a purse of six thousand francs per year, given for two years. The purse increased in 1926 until Blumenthal's death in 1930 to ten thousand francs for two years.

== History ==
Beginning in 1919 the foundation awarded nearly two hundred grants, and on April 11, 1937, the Prix Blumenthal was declared d'utilité publique ("of public service"), giving it a special tax classification. Awards were given through 1954. At the time of the foundation's dissolution in 1973 it was under the direction of Georges Huisman, director of the école des Beaux-Arts, along with author André Maurois and novelist Roland Dorgelès.

In 2010 (May 14 – June 5), the Médiathèque of Haguenau hosted an exhibit of the Florence Blumenthal archives.

== Jurors and leadership ==
Jurors included philosopher Henri Bergson; novelist Roland Dorgelès; novelist, essayist, diplomat and playwright Jean Giraudoux; writer Anna de Noailles; poet and essayist Paul Valéry; painter Paul Signac, painter and printmaker Édouard Vuillard, sculptor Paul Landowski, painter and sculptor Aristide Maillol, architect Auguste Perret, composer Paul Dukas, composer Maurice Ravel and composer/conductor Guy Ropartz.

Composer Georges Migot served as vice-president and subsequently as president (1931–1935) of the foundation, as well as the archivist of the winners.

=== Florence Meyer Blumenthal ===
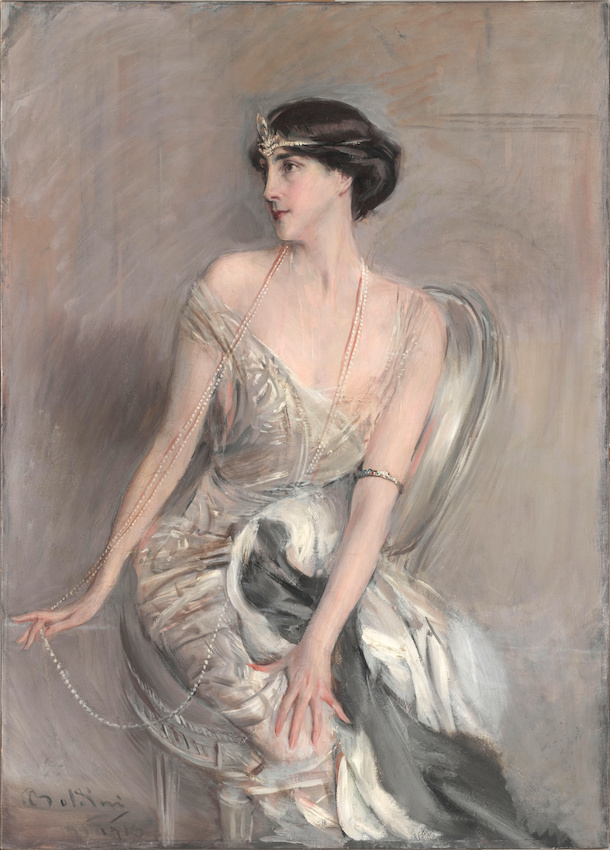
Florence Blumenthal

Florence Meyer Blumenthal had married international financier George Blumenthal in 1898 and in 1919, she organized what was originally called the La Fondation américaine Blumenthal pour la pensée et l’art français (American Foundation for French Art and Thought) – a name suggested by her friend, Paul Valéry, the poet and essayist – and what ultimately became Fondation franco-américaine Florence Blumenthal.

Blumethal's younger brother Eugene Meyer Jr. later become the president and publisher of The Washington Post – and was the father of Katharine Graham, editor of The Washington Post during Watergate. She was also related to Levi Strauss through her sisters.

In 1925, Blumenthal moved to Paris with her husband, later donating large sums to the Children's Hospital in Paris, the Metropolitan Museum of Art in New York and the Sorbonne in Paris. Blumenthal died in Paris in 1930, at age fifty-five, having won, along with her husband, the French Legion of Honor the previous year.

== Impact of the Prix ==
As an example of the impact of the Prix Blumenthal, textile artist Paule Marrot received the stipend in 1928, which allowed Marrot to open her workshop in Batignolles on rue Truffaut – where she became widely known for furniture textiles. Marrot went on to experience strong popularity and commercial success in the U.S. after World War II, made a strong impact at Renault by pioneering the company's textile and color division, and redefined furnishing fabrics in France. In 1952 Marrot was awarded the French Légion d'honneur (Legion of Honor), (Chevalier) – and her textiles continue under license to diverse companies including Nike, Anthropologie and the handbag maker, Hayden-Harnett.

== Recipients ==
Partial list, by year of award:

- 1920 Charles Malfray (1887–1940), sculptor
- 1920 Jacques Rivière (1886–1925), writer
- 1921 Georges Migot (1891–1976), composer, painter and carver
- 1921 René Buthaud (1886–1986), painter, engraver, ceramics
- 1922 Roger Désormière (1898–1963), conductor
- 1922 André Fraye, (1922–1963), painter
- 1922 Maurice Genevoix (1890–1980), writer
- 1922 Maurice Guy-Loë (1898–1991), painter
- 1922 Joseph Inguimberty (1896–1971), painter
- 1923 Jean Adnet (1900–1995), painter
- 1923 Paul Charlemagne (1892–1972), painter
- 1924 Maurice Brianchon (1899–1979), painter
- 1924 Gérard Cochet (1888–1969), engraver
- 1924 François Desnoyer (1894–1972), painter
- 1924 René Gabriel (1899–1950), decorator
- 1924 Marcel (Antoine) Gimond (1894–1961), sculptor
- 1926 Robert Louis Antral, engraver, lithographer
- 1926 Paul Belmondo (1989–1982), sculptor
- 1926 Paule Marrot (1902–1987), textile artist
- 1926 Robert Siohan (1894–1985), composer and conductor
- 1926 Pierre Traverse (1892–1979), sculptor
- 1926 Maximilien Vox (1894–1974), cartoonist and graphic designer
- 1928 Emile Bouneau (1902–1970), painter
- 1928 Robert Cami (1900–1975), engraver
- 1928 Louis Guilloux (1899–1980), writer
- 1928 Charles-Émile Pinson (1906–1963), engraver
- 1928 Manuel Rosenthal (1904–2003), composer and conductor
- 1928 Alexandre Vialatte (1901–1971), French writer
- 1929 Jacques Denier (1894–1983), painter
- 1930 Marcel Aymé (1902–1967), writer
- 1930 Robert Couturier (1905–2008), sculptor
- 1930 André Jacquemin (1904–1992), painter
- 1930 Paul Pouchol (1904–1963), pottery
- 1930 Maurice-Georges Poncelet (1897–1978), painter
- 1932 Eugène Dabit (1898–1936), author
- 1932 Ferdinand Lot, poet
- 1932 Raymond Martin (1910–1992), sculptor
- 1932 Louis Neillot (1898–1973), painter
- 1932 André Planson (1898–1981), painter
- 1932 Gaston Poulain, art critic
- 1932 Suzanne Tourte (1904–1979), engraver, painter
- 1934 Christian Caillard (1899–1985), painter
- 1934 Pierre-Octave Ferroud (1900–1936), composer
- 1934 Madeleine Lamberet (1908–1999), painter
- 1934 Henri Mahé (1907–1975), decorative painter
- 1934 Jean Oberlé (1900–1961), painter
- 1934 Hubert Yencesse (1900–1987), sculptor
- 1935 André Arbus (1903–1969), cabinet maker
- 1936 Jules Cavaillès (1901–1977), painter
- 1936 Raymond Corbin (1907–2002), sculptor and medallist
- 1936 Maurice Duruflé (1902–1986), composer and organist
- 1936 Germaine Richier (1902–1959), sculptor
- 1936 Gabriel-Sébastien Simonet (1909–1990), sculptor
- 1938 Henri-Georges Adam (1904–1967), as engraver
- 1938 Pierre Capdevielle (1906–1969), conductor
- 1938 Jean René Bazaine (1904–2001), painter
- 1939 Xavier de Langlais (1906–1975), painter, writer
- 1939 Etienne-Henri Martin (1905–1998), real-estate designer
- 1941 Jean Follain (1903–1971), author and poet
- 1946 Jean Carton (1912–1988), painter, sculptor
- 1946 Émile Damais (1906–2003), composer and musicologist
- 1946 Guy Montis (1918–1976), painter
- 1946 Boris Taslitzky, (1911–2005), painter
- 1947 Jean Delpech (1916–1988), painter
- 1948 Jean Amblard (1911–1989), painter
- 1948 Pierre Roulot (1917–2007), decorator
- 1948 Auguste-Jean Gaudin (1914–1992), (as) engraver
- 1950 Bernard Cathelin (1919–2004), painter
- 1950 Serge Nigg (1924–2008), composer
- 1952 André Brasilier (1929–), painter
- 1954 Maurice Legendre (1928–), sculptor
- 1954 Gérard Blanchard (1927–1998), engraver
- 1955 Paul Coupille (1928–), painter
- 1958 Ida Gotkovsky (1933–), French pianist and composer
- 1960 Jean-Claude Bertrand (1928–), painter

Undated:

- André Chamson (1900–1983), archivist and novelist
- Claudius Linossier
- Pierre Legrain
