= Cathelin =

Cathelin is a surname. Notable people with the surname include:

- Bernard Cathelin (1919–2004), French painter
- Louis-Jacques Cathelin (1738–1804), French engraver
