= Florence Meyer Blumenthal =

American philanthropist (1875–1930)

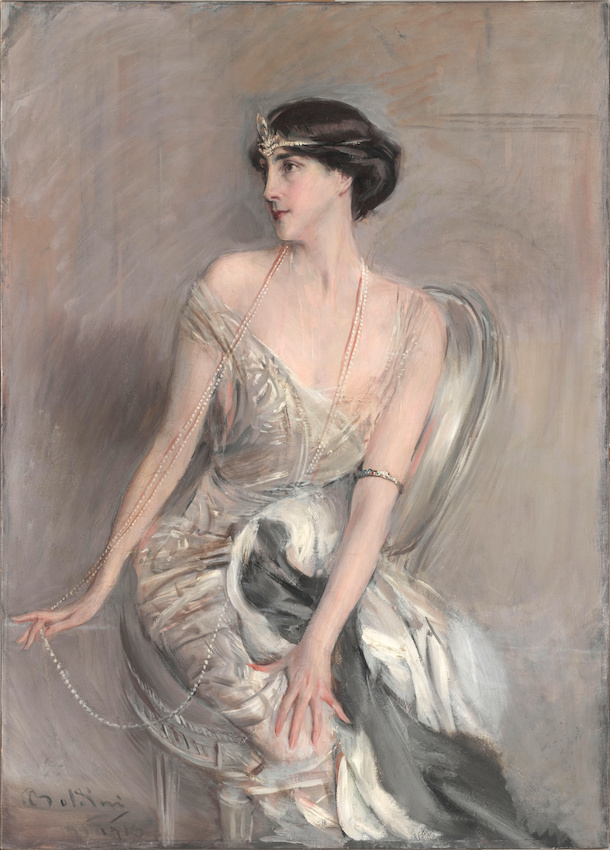
- Born: Florence Meyer; 1875; Los Angeles, California, U.S.
- Died: 1930 (aged 54–55) [Paris, France]]
- Spouse: George Blumenthal (m. 1898)
- Parent(s): Marc Eugene Meyer; Harriet Newmark Meyer
- Relatives: Aline Meyer Liebman (sister)

Florence Meyer Blumenthal (1875 – 1930) was an American philanthropist who founded the Fondation franco-américaine Florence Blumenthal (Franco-American Florence Blumenthal Foundation), which awarded the Prix Blumenthal from 1919-1954 to painters, sculptors, decorators, engravers, writers, and musicians — to promote Franco-American relations.

For their altruism, Florence Blumenthal and her husband George Blumenthal received the French Legion of Honor in 1929. Both a street as well as a public square in Paris are named in her honor.

== Biography ==
Florence Meyer was born in Los Angeles in 1875, the third of eight children of Marc Eugene Meyer, dry goods merchant from Strasbourg, France, and Harriet Newmark Meyer, daughter of Joseph Newmark, who founded New York's Elm Street Synagogue. Florence's younger brother Eugene Meyer Jr. was president and publisher of The Washington Post. In 1898, Florence married international financier George Blumenthal. In 1919, she organized the La Fondation américaine Blumenthal pour la pensée et l’art français (American Foundation for French Art and Thought) in Paris to discover young French artists, aid them financially, and in the process draw the United States and France closer together through art, thought, and literature.

In 1925, Blumenthal moved to Paris with her husband, later donating to the Children’s Hospital in Paris, the Metropolitan Museum of Art in New York, the Sorbonne in Paris. She and her husband received the French Legion of Honor in 1929, and Blumenthal died of bronchial pneumonia at her home in Paris on September 21, 1930, at age fifty-five.

Washington Post publisher Katharine Graham described her aunt, known within the family as Florie, as having a perfect figure and for "bringing home massive amounts of clothing from Paris." Blumenthal was also related to the Levi Strauss family through her older sisters, Rosalie and Elise, each of whom had married a nephew of Strauss'.

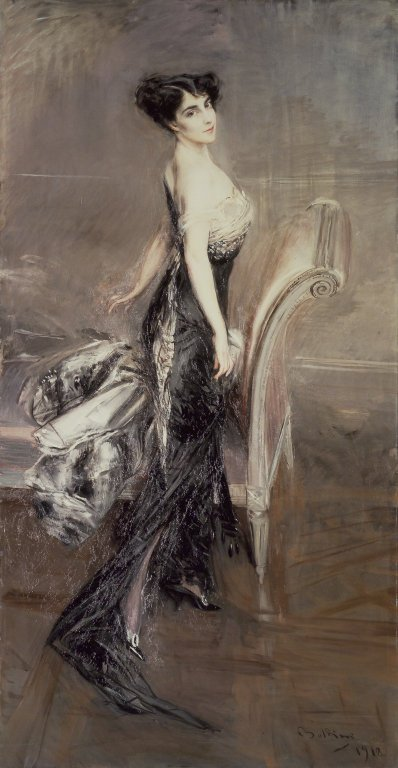
Blumenthal in 1912 painted by Giovanni Boldini, Brooklyn Museum.

The Blumenthals summered in France or on yachts in the Mediterranean and were noted for their residences, Knollwood Club in the Adirondacks, their mansion in New York (half a city block and had an indoor tiled swimming pool) as well as their mansion in Paris, for which an entire wing was built to house a new organ.

In 1907, she and her husband were injured in an automobile accident in Paris, where George Blumenthal received a bad cut on his face. The Blumenthals had one son, who died at an early age.

Blumenthal died on September 21, 1930, at age fifty-five, of bronchial pneumonia at home in Paris.

Between May 14 and June 5, 2010, the Médiathèque of Haguenau hosted an exhibit of the Florence Blumenthal archives.

Recognizing the quality of care provided to their son by Professor Le Mee at the Necker Children's Hospital in Paris, the Blumenthals make a significant donation for the construction of a new building, the Blumenthal Pavilion, built in 1926 as an innovative Ear Nose & Throat (ENT) center operating around the clock, similar to the Children's Hospital of Philadelphia.

== Prix Blumenthal ==
The Prix Blumenthal (or Blumenthal Prize) was a grant or stipend awarded through the Fondation franco-américaine Florence Blumenthal (Franco-American Florence Blumenthal Foundation), which Florence Blumenthal had founded. Grants were given from 1919-1954 to painters, sculptors, decorators, engravers, writers, and musicians.

Juries including Paul Signac and Aristide Maillol, awarded a Prix Blumenthal purse of six thousand francs per year for two years. This was increased from 1926 until her death in 1930 to ten thousand francs a year.

From 1919 to 1954, nearly two hundred artists received grants, including in 1921 Georges Migot (1891–1976), composer, painter, and a carver; in 1926 Paul Belmondo, sculptor; also in 1926 Paule Marrot, textile artist; in 1930 Robert Couturier, sculptor; in 1934 Jean Oberlé, painter and in 1941 Jean Follain, author and poet.

=== Impact of the Prix ===
As an example of the impact of the Prix Blumenthal, textile artist Paule Marrot received the stipend in 1928, which allowed Marrot to open her workshop in Batignolles on rue Truffaut — where she became widely known for furniture textiles. Marrot went on to experience strong popularity and commercial success in the U.S. after World War II, made a strong impact at Renault in pioneering the company's textile and color division, and redefined furnishing fabrics in France. In 1952 Marrot won in 1952, the French Légion d'honneur (Legion of Honor), (Chevalier) — and her textiles continue under license to diverse companies including Nike, Anthropologie and the handbag maker, Hayden-Harnett.
