= Damais =

Damais is a surname. Notable people with the surname include:

- Émile Damais (1906–2003), French composer and musicologist
- Louis-Charles Damais (1911–1966), French orientalist
