= Bohemia =

Historical region in the Czech Republic

Coordinates: 50°N 15°E

Bohemia Čechy (Czech)
- Historical land
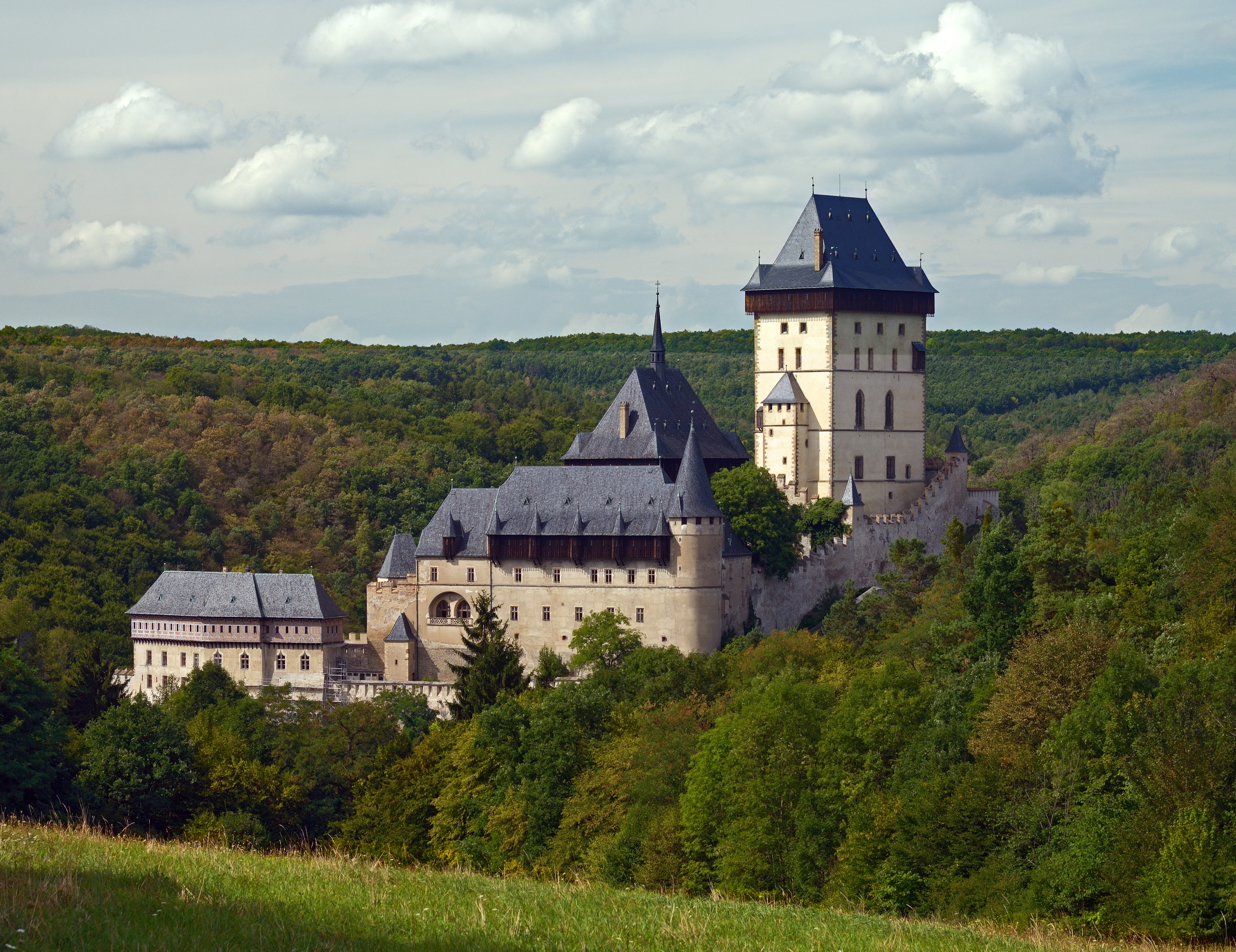
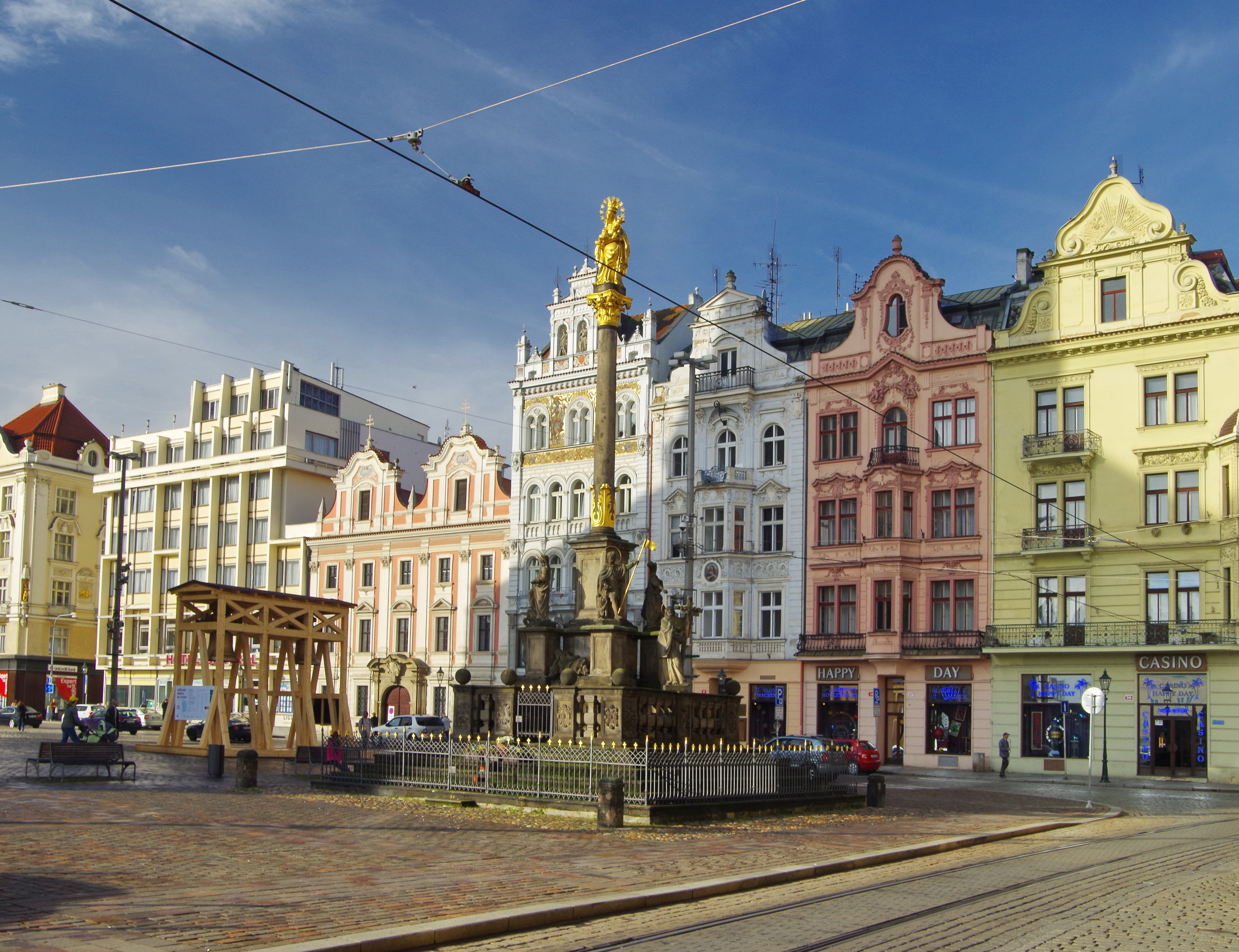
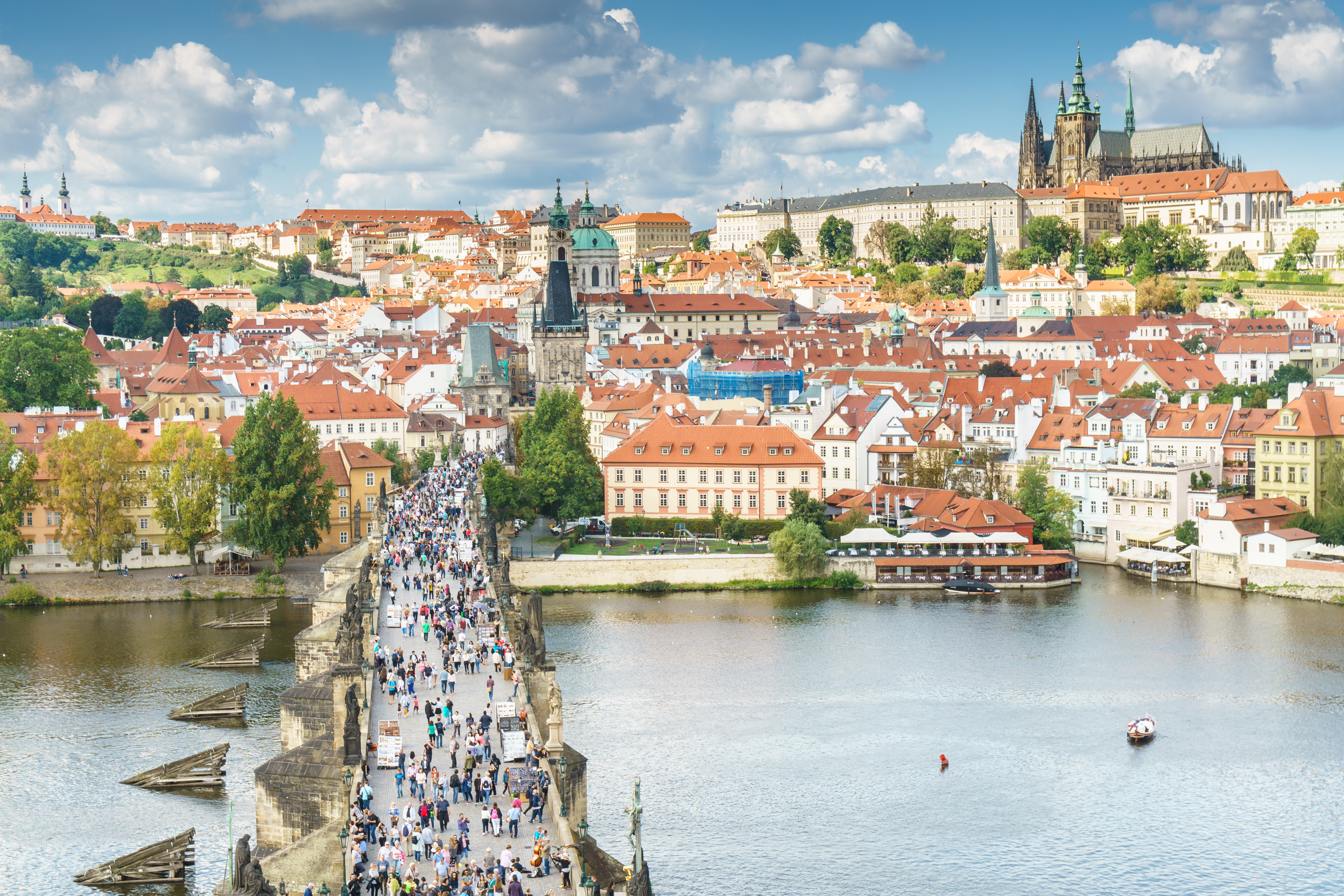
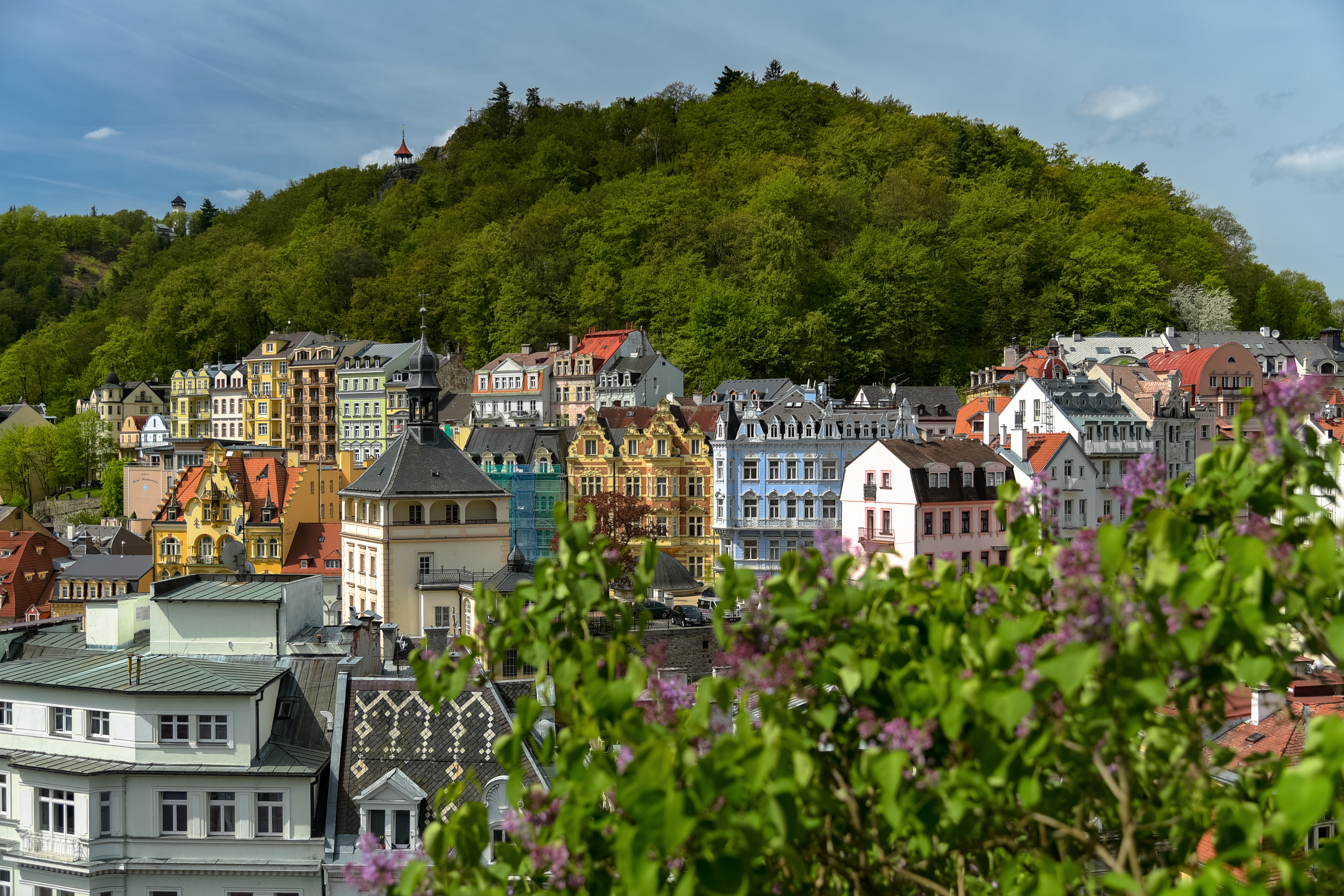
- From top, left to right: Karlštejn Castle; Plzeň; Prague; Karlovy Vary

- Flag Coat of arms

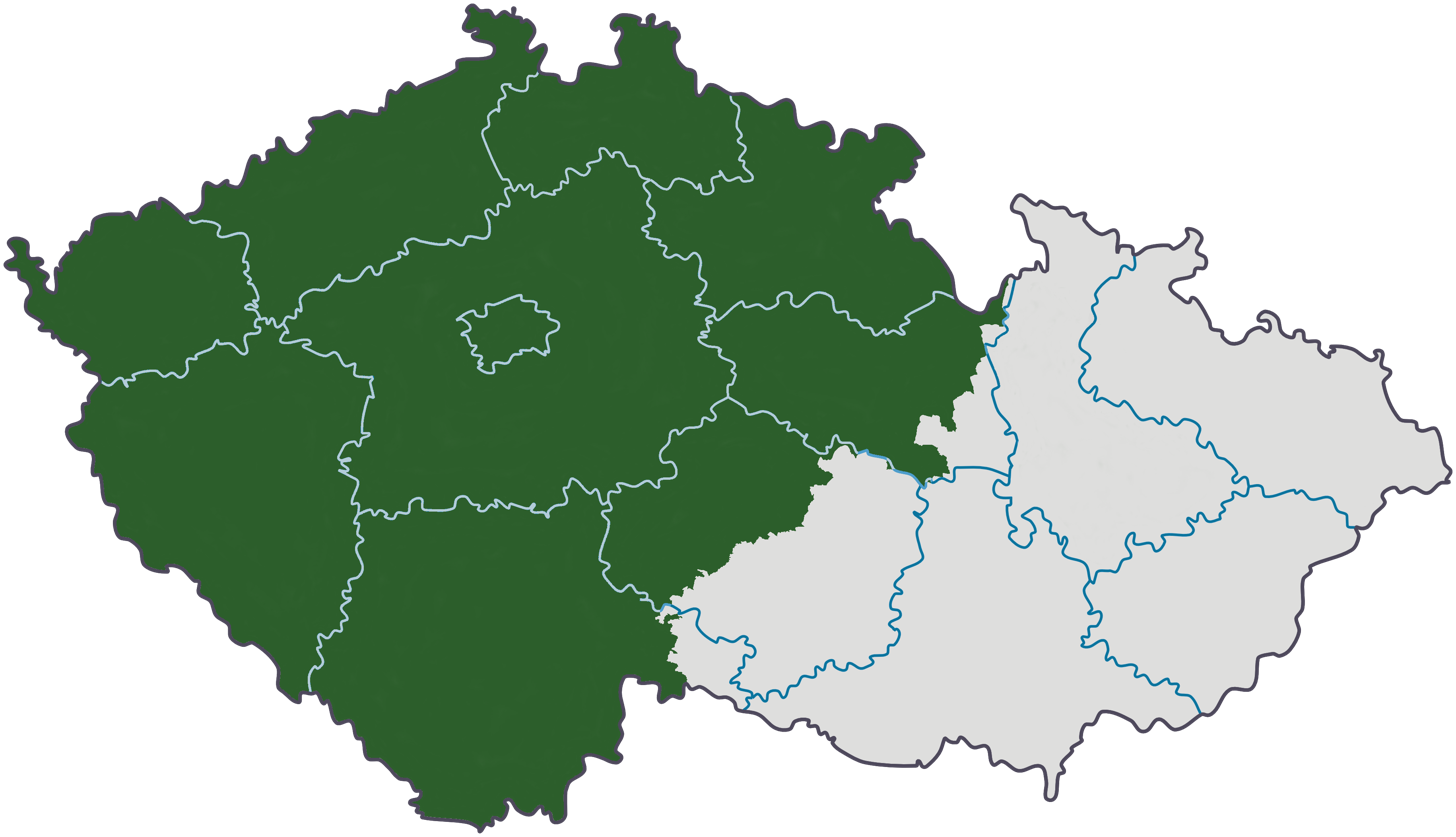
- Bohemia (green) overlapped with the current regions of the Czech Republic

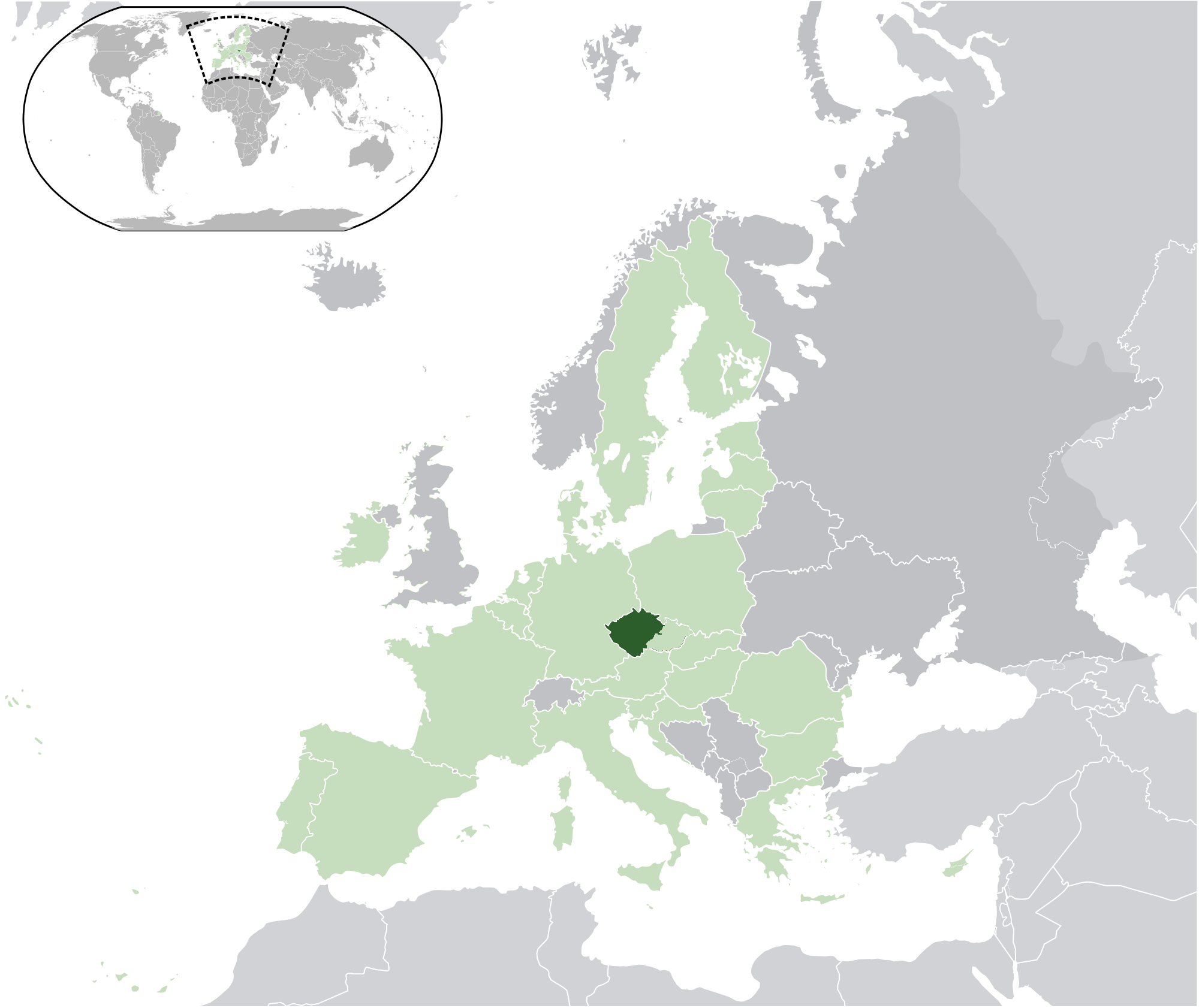
- Location of Bohemia in the European Union
- Country: Czech Republic
- Capital: Prague

Area
  - Total: 52,065 km^{2} (20,102 sq mi)

Population (2024)
  - Total: 6,880,000
  - Density: 132/km^{2} (342/sq mi)
- Demonym: Bohemian
- Time zone: UTC+1 (CET)
  - Summer (DST): UTC+2 (CEST)

Bohemia (/boʊˈhiːmiə/ boh-HEE-mee-ə; Czech: Čechy [ˈtʃɛxɪ]; (Note: There is no distinction in Czech between adjectives referring to Bohemia and to the Czech Republic; i.e. český means both Bohemian and Czech.) German: Böhmen [ˈbøːmən]) is the westernmost and largest historical region of the Czech Republic. Bohemia can also refer to a wider area consisting of the historical Lands of the Bohemian Crown ruled by the Bohemian kings, including Moravia and Czech Silesia, in which case the term refers to the historical cultural and political space of the Czech people. The smaller region is then referred to as Bohemia proper as a means of distinction.

== Overview of development ==
The 9th century Bohemian principality became a part of Great Moravia, and then an independent Duchy of Bohemia, which became a kingdom in the Holy Roman Empire. This subsequently became a part of the Habsburg monarchy and the Austrian Empire. After World War I and the establishment of an independent Czechoslovak state, the whole of Bohemia became a part of Czechoslovakia, defying claims of the German-speaking inhabitants that regions with German-speaking majority should be included in the Republic of German-Austria. Between 1938 and 1945, these border regions were annexed to Nazi Germany as the Sudetenland.

The remainder of Czech territory became the Second Czechoslovak Republic and was subsequently occupied as the Protectorate of Bohemia and Moravia until the end of World War II, after which Bohemia became part of the restored Czechoslovakia. In 1968, the Czech lands (including Bohemia) were invaded by Warsaw Pact troops sent by the Soviet Union and stayed under occupation as the Czech Socialist Republic until the Velvet Revolution in 1989. In 1990, the name was changed to the Czech Republic, which became a separate state in 1993 with the breakup of Czechoslovakia.

Until 1948, Bohemia was an administrative unit of Czechoslovakia as one of its "lands" (země). Since then, administrative reforms have replaced self-governing lands with a modified system of "regions" (kraje), which do not follow the borders of the historical Czech lands (or the regions from the 1960 and 2000 reforms). However, the three lands are mentioned in the preamble of the Constitution of the Czech Republic: "We, citizens of the Czech Republic in Bohemia, Moravia and Silesia..."

Historical population
Year	Pop.	±%
1869	5,119,968	—
1880	5,575,812	+8.9%
1890	5,858,677	+5.1%
1900	6,335,301	+8.1%
1910	6,787,632	+7.1%
1921	6,675,404	−1.7%
1930	7,114,712	+6.6%
1950	5,677,200	−20.2%
1961	5,991,967	+5.5%
1970	6,028,088	+0.6%
1980	6,270,672	+4.0%
1991	6,245,688	−0.4%
2001	6,202,210	−0.7%
2011	6,479,056	+4.5%
2021	6,609,326	+2.0%
Source: Censuses

Bohemia had an area of 52,065 km^{2} (20,102 sq mi), and today is home to about 6.9 million of the Czech Republic's 10.9 million inhabitants. Bohemia was bordered in the south by Upper and Lower Austria (both in Austria), in the west by Bavaria (in Germany), and in the north by Saxony and Lusatia (in Germany and Poland, respectively), in the northeast by Silesia (in Poland), and in the east by Moravia (also part of the Czech Republic). Bohemia's borders were mostly marked by mountain ranges such as the Bohemian Forest, the Ore Mountains, and the Giant Mountains; the Bohemian-Moravian border roughly follows the Elbe-Danube watershed.

== Etymology ==
In the second century BC, the Romans competed for dominance in northern Italy with various peoples, including the Gauls-Celtic tribe Boii. The Romans defeated the Boii at the Battle of Placentia (194 BC) and the Battle of Mutina (193 BC). Afterward, many of the Boii retreated north across the Alps. Much later Roman authors refer to the area they had once occupied as Boiohaemum. The earliest mention is in Tacitus' Germania 28 (written at the end of the first century AD), and later mentions of the same name are in Strabo and Velleius Paterculus. The name appears to consist of the tribal name Boio- plus the Proto-Germanic noun *haimaz "home" (whence Gothic haims, German Heim, Heimat, English home), indicating a Proto-Germanic *Bajahaimaz.

Boiohaemum was apparently isolated to the area where King Marobod's kingdom was centered, within the Hercynian Forest. Byzantine Emperor Constantine VII in his 10th-century work De Administrando Imperio also mentioned the region as Boiki (see White Serbia).

The Czech name "Čechy" is derived from the name of the Slavic ethnic group, the Czechs, who settled in the area during the sixth or seventh century AD.

== History ==
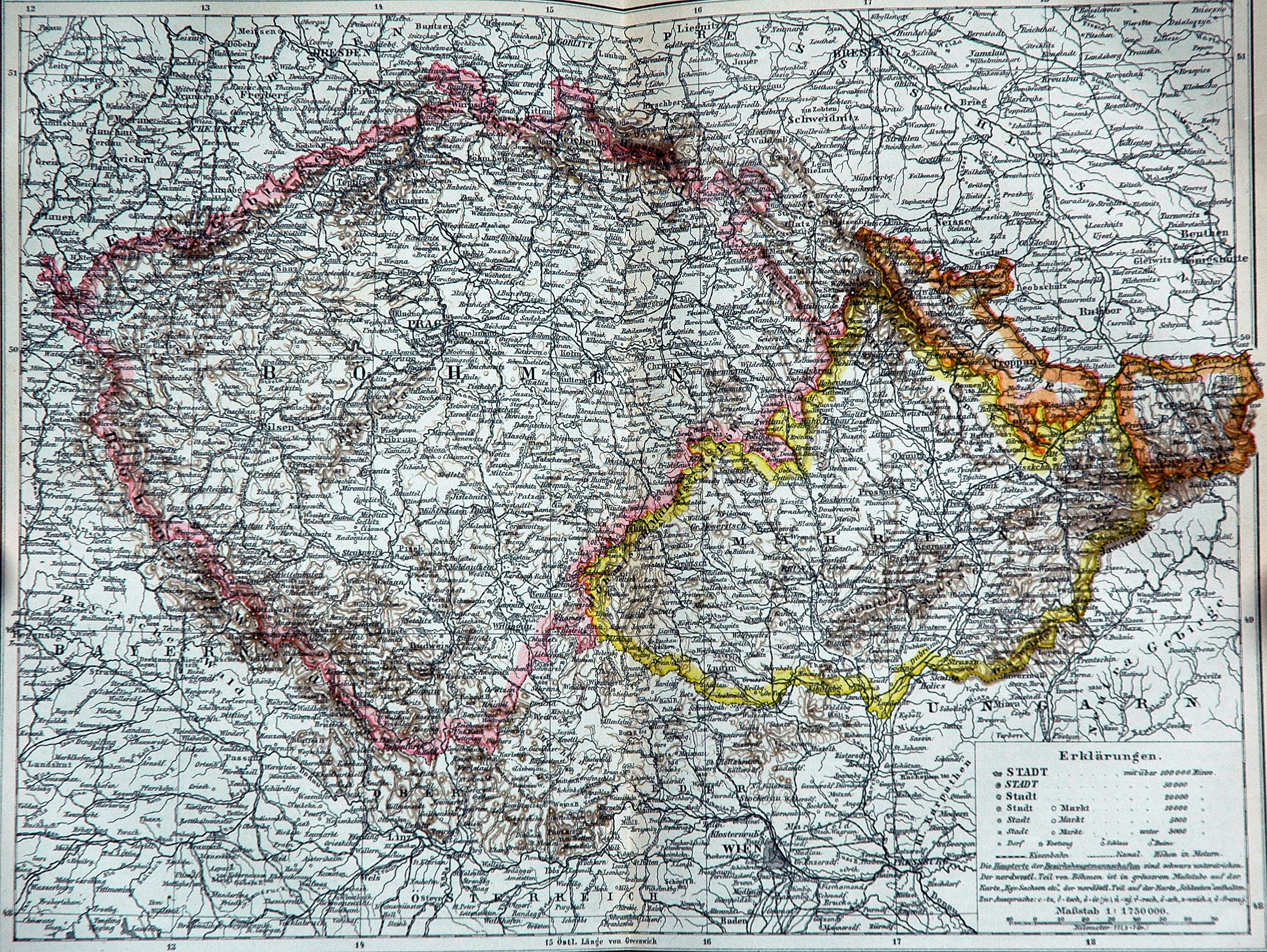
An 1892 map showing Bohemia proper outlined in pink, Moravia in yellow, and Austrian Silesia in orange

=== Ancient Bohemia ===
Bohemia, like neighboring Bavaria, is named after the Boii, a large Celtic nation known to the Romans for their migrations and settlement in northern Italy and other places. Another part of the nation moved west with the Helvetii into southern France, one of the events leading to the interventions of Julius Caesar's Gaulish campaign of 58 BC. The emigration of the Helvetii and Boii left southern Germany and Bohemia a lightly inhabited "desert" into which Suebic peoples arrived, speaking Germanic languages, and became dominant over remaining Celtic groups. To the south, over the Danube, the Romans extended their empire, and to the southeast, in present-day Hungary, were Dacian peoples.

In the area of modern Bohemia, the Marcomanni and other Suebic groups were led by their king, Marobodus, after being defeated by Roman forces in Germany. He took advantage of the natural defenses provided by its mountains and forests. They were able to maintain a strong alliance with neighboring tribes, including (at different times) the Lugii, Quadi, Hermunduri, Semnones, and Buri, which was sometimes partly controlled by the Roman Empire and sometimes in conflict with it; for example, in the second century, they fought Marcus Aurelius.

In late classical times and the early Middle Ages, two new Suebic groupings appeared west of Bohemia in southern Germany, the Alemanni (in the Helvetian desert) and the Bavarians (Baiuvarii). Many Suebic tribes from the Bohemian region took part in such movements westward, settling as far away as Spain and Portugal. With them were also tribes who had pushed from the east, such as the Vandals and Alans.

Other groups pushed southward toward Pannonia. The last known mention of the Kingdom of the Marcomanni, concerning a queen named Fritigil, is from the fourth century, and she was thought to have lived in or near Pannonia. The Suebian Langobardi, who moved over many generations from the Baltic Sea, via the Elbe and Pannonia to Italy, recorded in a tribal history a time spent in "Bainaib".

After the Migration Period, Bohemia was partially repopulated around the sixth century, and eventually Slavic tribes arrived from the east, and their language began to replace the older Germanic, Celtic, and Sarmatian ones. These are precursors of today's Czechs, but the exact amount of Slavic immigration and waves is a subject of debate, see Bohemians (tribe). The death of Samo's tribal confederation marked the end of the old "Slavonic" confederation, the second attempt to establish such a Slavonic union after Carantania in Carinthia.

The 9th century was crucial for Bohemia's future. The manorial system sharply declined, as it did in Bavaria. The influence of the central Fraganeo-Czechs grew, as a result of the important cultic center in their territory. They were Slavic-speaking and contributed to the transformation of diverse neighboring populations into a new nation named and led by them with a united "Slavic" ethnic consciousness. Christianity first appeared in the early 9th century, but became dominant only in the 10th or 11th century.

=== Přemysl dynasty ===
The coat of arms of the Přemyslid dynasty (until 1253–1262)

Bohemia was made a part of the early Slavic state of Great Moravia, under the rule of Svatopluk I (r. 870–894). After Svatopluk's death Great Moravia was weakened by years of internal conflict and constant warfare, ultimately collapsing and fragmenting because of continual incursions by invading nomadic Magyars. Bohemia's initial incorporation into the Moravian Empire resulted in the extensive Christianization of the population. A native monarchy arose, and Bohemia came under the rule of the Přemyslid dynasty, which ruled the Czech lands for several hundred years.

The Přemyslids secured their frontiers after the Moravian state's collapse by entering into a state of semivassalage to the Frankish rulers. The alliance was facilitated by Bohemia's conversion to Christianity in the 9th century. Continuing close relations were developed with the East Frankish Kingdom, which devolved from the Carolingian Empire, into East Francia, eventually becoming the Holy Roman Empire.

After a decisive victory of the Holy Roman Empire and Bohemia over invading Magyars in the 955 Battle of Lechfeld, Boleslaus I of Bohemia was granted Moravia by German emperor Otto the Great. Bohemia remained a largely autonomous state under the Holy Roman Empire for several decades. The jurisdiction of the Holy Roman Empire was definitively reasserted when Jaromír of Bohemia was granted fief of the Kingdom of Bohemia by Emperor King Henry II of the Holy Roman Empire, with the promise that he hold it as a vassal once he reoccupied Prague with a German army in 1004, ending the rule of Bolesław I of Poland.

The first to use the title of "King of Bohemia" were the Přemyslid dukes Vratislav II (1085) and Vladislaus II (1158), but their heirs returned to the title of duke. The title of king became hereditary under Ottokar I (1198). His grandson Ottokar II (king from 1253 to 1278) conquered a short-lived empire that contained modern Austria and Slovenia. Substantial German immigration began in the mid-13th century, as the court sought to replace losses from the brief Mongol invasion of Europe in 1241. Germans settled primarily along Bohemia's northern, western, and southern borders, although many lived in towns throughout the kingdom.

=== Luxembourg dynasty ===
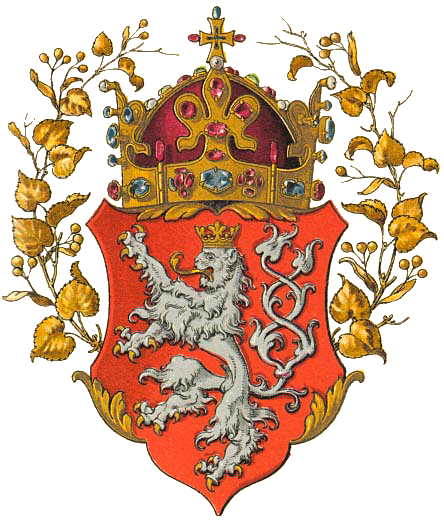
The coat of arms of the Kingdom of Bohemia

The House of Luxembourg accepted the invitation to the Bohemian throne with the marriage to the Přemyslid heiress, Elizabeth and the crowning subsequent of John I of Bohemia (in the Czech Republic known as Jan Lucemburský) in 1310. His son, Charles IV, became King of Bohemia in 1346. He founded Charles University in Prague, Central Europe's first university, two years later.

His reign brought Bohemia to its peak both politically and in total area, resulting in his being the first king of Bohemia to be elected Holy Roman Emperor. Under his rule, the Bohemian crown controlled such diverse lands as Moravia, Silesia, Upper Lusatia and Lower Lusatia, Brandenburg, an area around Nuremberg called New Bohemia, Luxembourg, and several small towns scattered around Germany.

From the 13th century on, settlements of Germans developed throughout Bohemia, making Bohemia a bilingual country. The Germans brought mining technology to the mountainous regions of the Sudetes. In the mining town of Sankt Joachimsthal (now Jáchymov), famous coins called Joachimsthalers were coined, which gave their name to the thaler and the dollar.

Meanwhile, Prague German intermediated between Upper German and East Central German, influencing the foundations of modern standard German. At the same time and place, the teachings of Jan Hus, the rector of Charles University and a prominent reformer and religious thinker, influenced the rise of modern Czech.

=== Hussite Bohemia ===
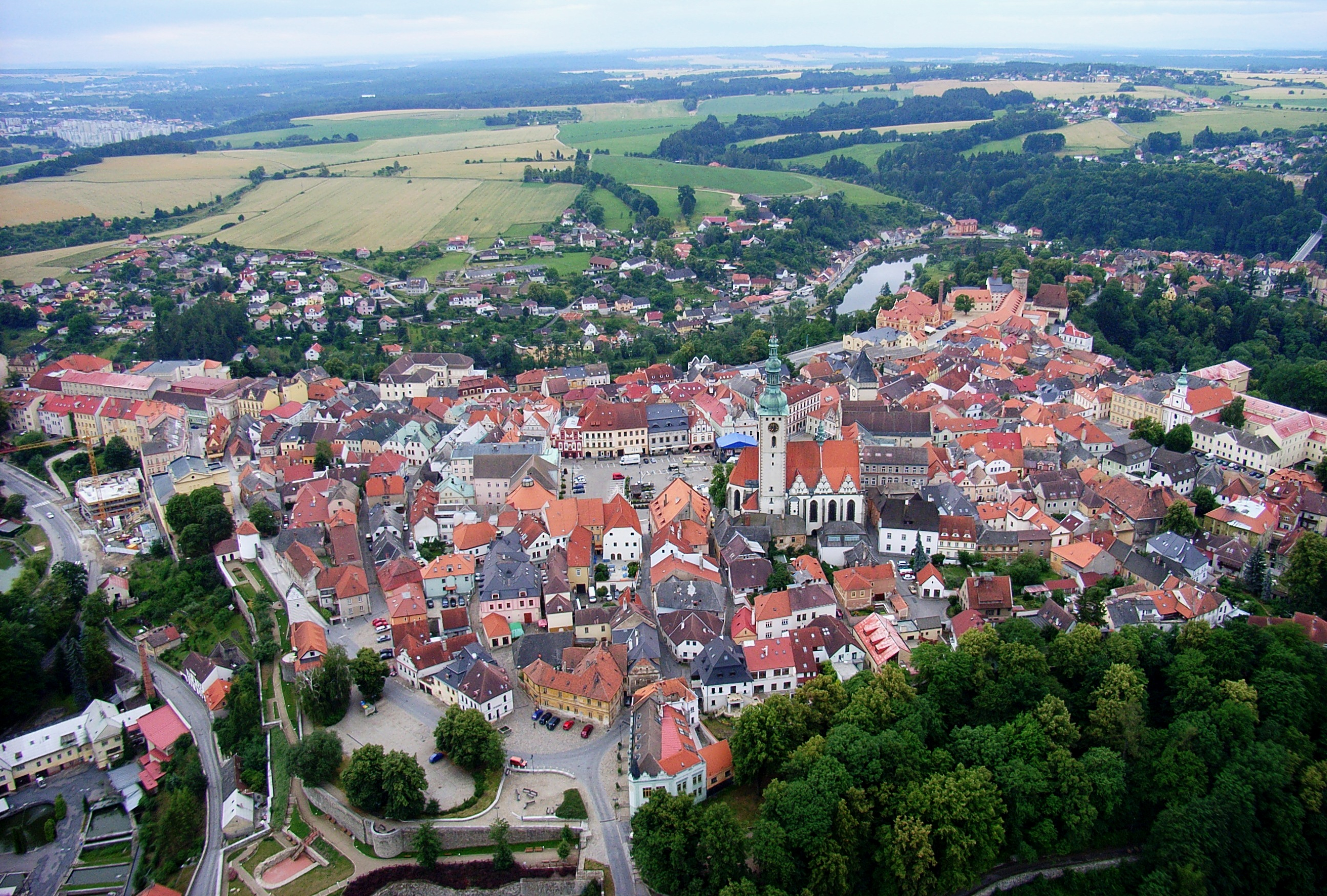
The radical Hussites became known as Taborites, after the town of Tábor that became their center.

During the ecumenical Council of Constance in 1415, Hus was sentenced to be burnt at the stake as a heretic. The verdict was passed even though Hus was granted formal protection by Emperor Sigismund of Luxembourg before the journey. Hus was invited to attend the council to defend himself and the Czech positions in the religious court, but with the emperor's approval, he was executed on 6 July 1415. His execution and five consecutive papal crusades against his followers forced the Bohemians to defend themselves in the Hussite Wars.

The uprising against imperial forces was led by a former mercenary, Jan Žižka of Trocnov. As the leader of the Hussite armies, he used innovative tactics and weapons, such as howitzers, pistols, and fortified wagons, which were revolutionary for the time and established Žižka as a great general who never lost a battle.

After Žižka's death, Prokop the Great took over the army's command, and under him the Hussites were victorious for another ten years, to Europe's terror. The Hussite cause gradually splintered into two main factions, the moderate Utraquists and the more fanatic Taborites. The Utraquists began to lay the groundwork for an agreement with the Catholic Church and found the more radical views of the Taborites distasteful. Additionally, with general war-weariness and yearning for order, the Utraquists were able to eventually defeat the Taborites in the Battle of Lipany in 1434. Sigismund said after the battle that "only the Bohemians could defeat the Bohemians."

Despite an apparent victory for the Catholics, the Bohemian Utraquists were still strong enough to negotiate freedom of religion in 1436. That happened in the so-called Compacts of Basel, declaring peace and freedom between Catholics and Utraquists. It lasted only a short time, as Pope Pius II declared the compacts invalid in 1462.

In 1458, George of Poděbrady was elected to the Bohemian throne. He is remembered for his attempt to set up a pan-European "Christian League" that would form all the states of Europe into a community based on religion. In the process of negotiating, he appointed Zdeněk Lev of Rožmitál to tour the European courts and to conduct the talks. The negotiations were not completed because George's position was substantially damaged over time by his deteriorating relationship with the Pope.

=== Habsburg Monarchy ===
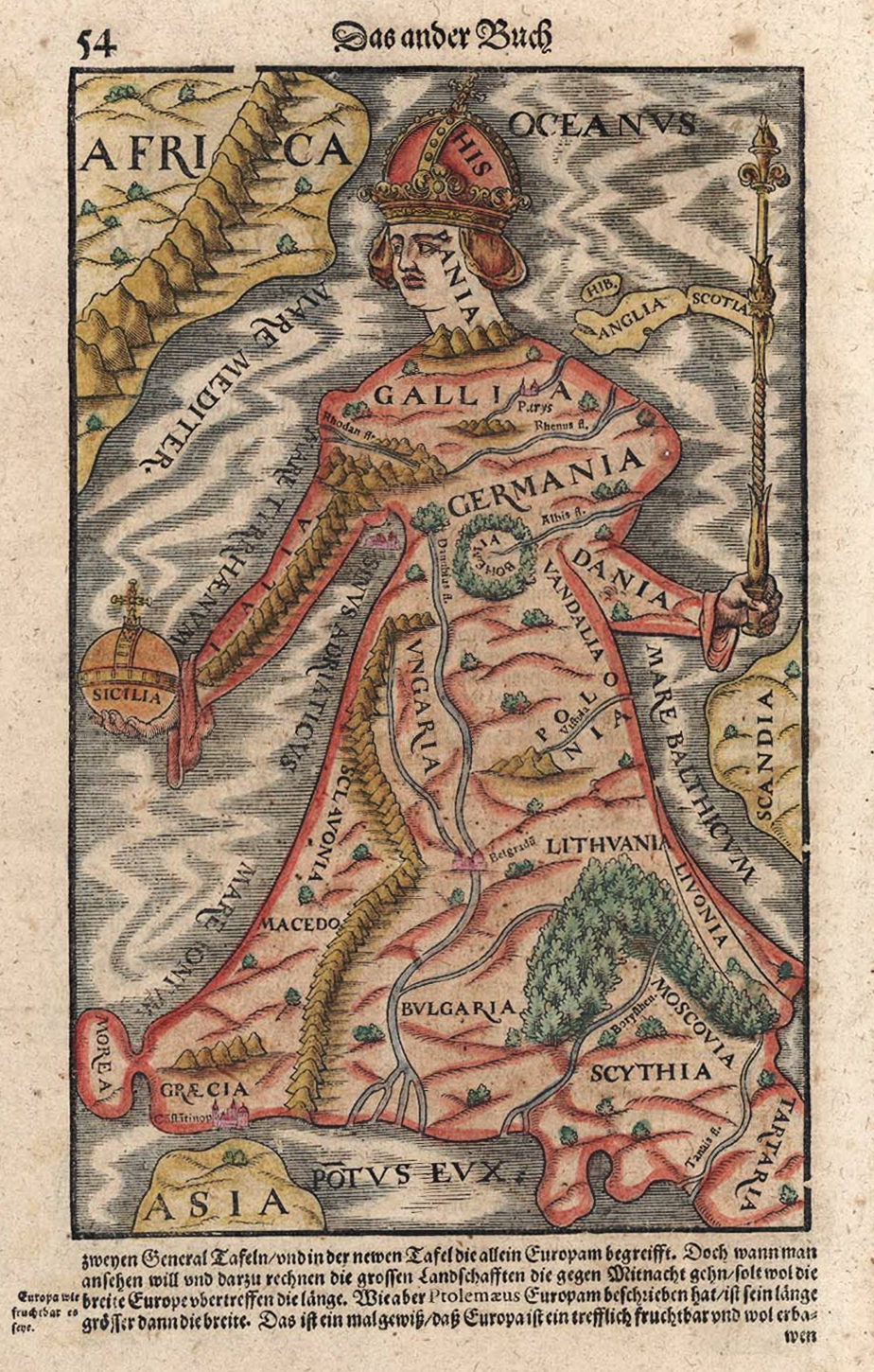
Bohemia as the heart of Europa regina; Sebastian Münster, Basel, 1570

After the death of King Louis II of Hungary and Bohemia in the Battle of Mohács in 1526, Archduke Ferdinand I of Austria became the new king of Bohemia, and the country became a constituent state of the Habsburg monarchy.

From 1599 to 1711, Moravia (a Land of the Bohemian Crown) was frequently raided by the Ottoman Empire and its vassals (especially the Tatars and Transylvania). Overall, hundreds of thousands were enslaved whilst tens of thousands were killed.

Bohemia enjoyed religious freedom between 1436 and 1620 and became one of the most liberal countries of the Christian world during that period. In 1609, Holy Roman Emperor Rudolf II, who made Prague again the capital of the empire at the time, himself a Roman Catholic, was moved by the Bohemian nobility to publish Maiestas Rudolphina, which confirmed the older Confessio Bohemica of 1575.

After Emperor Matthias II and then King of Bohemia Ferdinand II (later Holy Roman Emperor) began oppressing the rights of Protestants in Bohemia, the resulting Bohemian Revolt led to outbreak of the Thirty Years' War in 1618. Elector Frederick V of the Electorate of the Palatinate, a Calvinist Protestant, was elected by the Bohemian nobility to replace Ferdinand on the Bohemian throne and was known as the Winter King. Frederick's wife, the popular Elizabeth Stuart and subsequently Elizabeth of Bohemia, known as the Winter Queen or Queen of Hearts, was the daughter of King James I of England and VI of Scotland.

After Frederick's defeat in the Battle of White Mountain in 1620, 27 Bohemian estates leaders and Jan Jesenius, rector of the Charles University of Prague, were executed on Prague's Old Town Square on 21 June 1621, and the rest were exiled from the country; their lands were given to Catholic loyalists (mostly of Bavarian and Saxon origin). That ended the pro-reformation movement in Bohemia and the role of Prague as ruling city of the Holy Roman Empire.

The Kingdom of Bohemia in 1618 with other Bohemian Crown lands within the Holy Roman Empire (1618)

In the so-called "renewed constitution" of 1627, German was established as a second official language in the Czech lands. Czech formally remained the kingdom's first language, but both German and Latin were widely spoken among the ruling classes, although German became increasingly dominant, and Czech was spoken in much of the countryside.

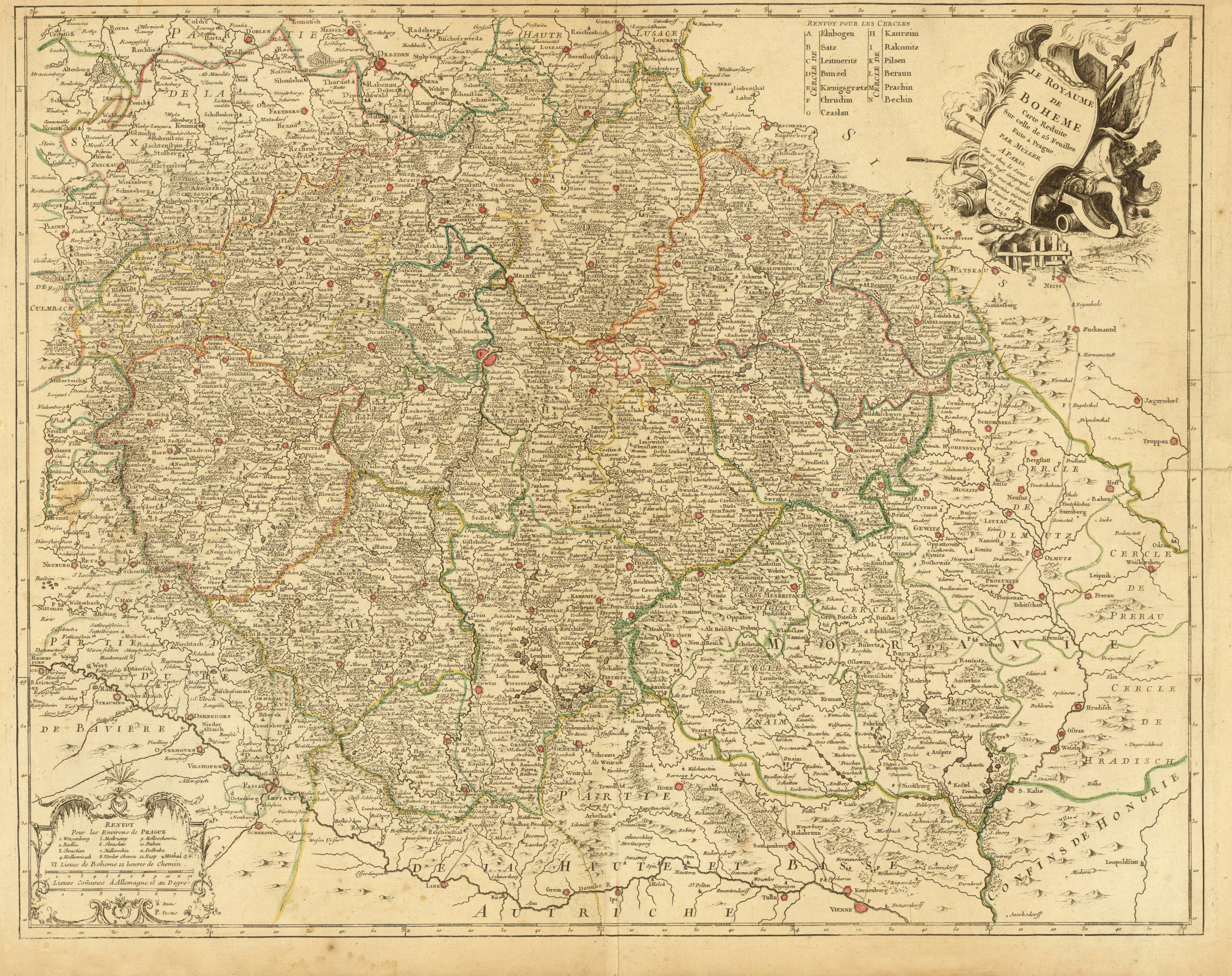
Detailed map of Bohemia, 1742

Bohemia's formal independence was further jeopardized when the Bohemian Diet approved administrative reform in 1749. It included the indivisibility of the Habsburg Empire and the centralization of rule, which essentially meant the merging of the Royal Bohemian Chancellery with the Austrian Chancellery.

At the end of the 18th century, the Czech National Revival movement, in cooperation with part of the Bohemian aristocracy, started a campaign for restoration of the kingdom's historic rights, whereby Czech was to regain its historical role and replace German as the language of administration. The enlightened absolutism of Joseph II and Leopold II, who introduced minor language concessions, showed promise for the Czech movement, but many of these reforms were later rescinded. During the Revolution of 1848, many Czech nationalists called for autonomy for Bohemia from Habsburg Austria, but the revolutionaries were defeated. At the same time, German-speaking towns elected representatives for the first German Parliament at Frankfurt. Towns between Karlsbad and Reichenberg chose leftist representatives, while Eger, Rumburg, and Troppau elected conservative representatives. The old Bohemian Diet, one of the last remnants of the independence, was dissolved, although Czech experienced a rebirth as romantic nationalism developed among the Czechs.

In 1861, a new elected Bohemian Diet was established. The renewal of the old Bohemian Crown (Kingdom of Bohemia, Margraviate of Moravia, and Duchy of Upper and Lower Silesia) became the official political program of both Czech liberal politicians and the majority of Bohemian aristocracy ("state rights program"), while parties representing the German minority and small part of the aristocracy proclaimed their loyalty to the centralist Constitution (so-called "Verfassungstreue").

After Austria's defeat in the Austro-Prussian War in 1866, Hungarian politicians achieved the Austro-Hungarian Compromise of 1867, ostensibly creating equality between the empire's Austrian and Hungarian halves. An attempt by the Czechs to create a tripartite monarchy (Austria-Hungary-Bohemia) failed in 1871. The "state-rights program" remained the official platform of all Czech political parties (except for social democrats) until 1918.

Under the state-rights program, appealing to the stability of Bohemia's borders over many centuries, the Czech emancipation movement claimed the right to the whole of the Bohemian lands over the Germans' right to the lands, amounting to a third of Bohemia, where they formed the majority.

=== Interbellum ===
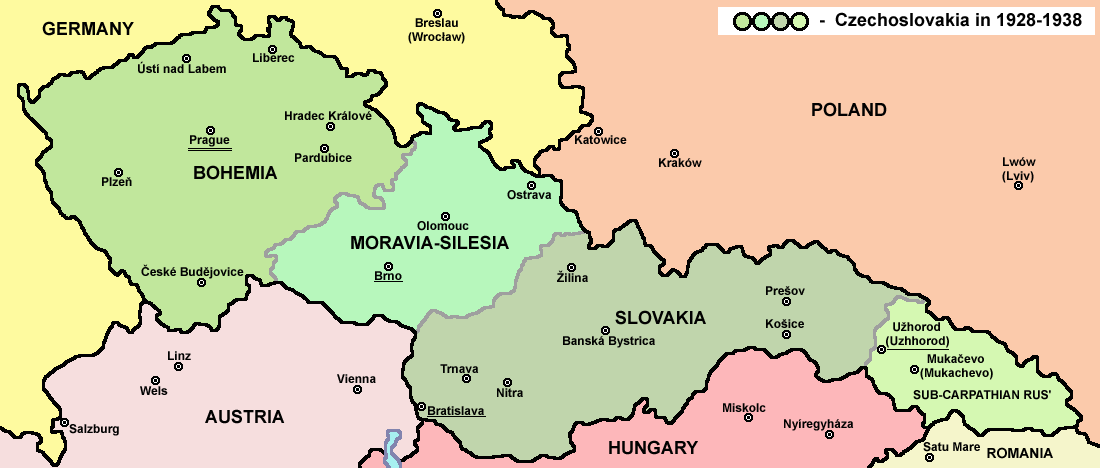
Bohemia (westernmost area) in Czechoslovakia 1918–1938

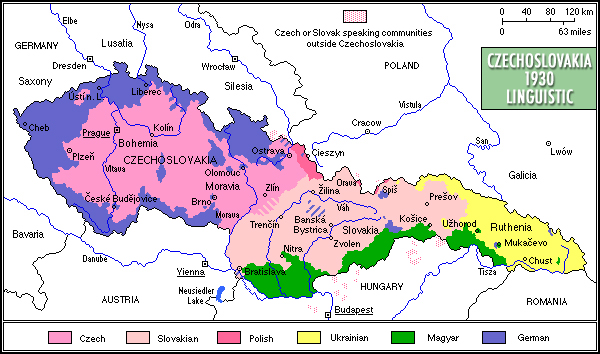
Linguistic map of interwar Czechoslovakia (c. 1930)

After World War I, the German Bohemians demanded that the regions with German-speaking majority be included in a German state. But Czech political leaders claimed the entire Bohemian lands, including majority German-speaking areas, for Czechoslovakia. By the end of October, bilingual towns had been occupied by Czech forces. By end of November, many purely German-speaking towns had been occupied. German or Austrian troops, bound by the ceasefire agreement, did not support Bohemian German self-defense, while the Czechoslovak army, an Entente army, could freely operate. The absorption of the German-speaking areas in Czechoslovakia was hence a fait accompli.

As a result, all of Bohemia (as the largest and most populous land) became the core of the newly formed country of Czechoslovakia, which combined Bohemia, Moravia, Czech Silesia, Upper Hungary (present-day Slovakia) and Carpathian Ruthenia into one state. Under its first president, Tomáš Masaryk, Czechoslovakia became a liberal democratic republic, but serious issues emerged regarding the Czech majority's relationship with the German and Hungarian minorities.

=== German occupation and World War II ===
After the Munich Agreement in 1938, the border regions of Bohemia historically inhabited predominantly by ethnic Germans (the Sudetenland) were annexed to Nazi Germany. The remnants of Bohemia and Moravia were then annexed by Germany in 1939, while the Slovak lands became the separate Slovak Republic, a puppet state of Nazi Germany. From 1939 to 1945, Bohemia (without the Sudetenland) and Moravia formed the German Protectorate of Bohemia and Moravia.

During World War II, the Germans operated the Theresienstadt Ghetto for Jews, the Dulag Luft Ost, Stalag IV-C and Stalag 359 prisoner-of-war camps for French, British, Belgian, Serbian, Dutch, Slovak, Soviet, Romanian, Italian and other Allied POWs, and the Ilag IV camp for interned civilians from western Allied countries in the region. There were also 17 subcamps of the Flossenbürg concentration camp, in which both men and women, mostly Polish, Soviet and Jewish, but also French, Yugoslav, Czech, Romani and of several other ethnicities, were imprisoned and subjected to forced labor, and 16 subcamps of the Gross-Rosen concentration camp, in which men and women, mostly Polish and Jewish, but also Czechs, Russians, and other people, were similarly imprisoned and subjected to forced labor.

Nazi authorities brutally suppressed any open opposition to German occupation, and many Czech patriots were executed as a result. In 1942, the Czechoslovak resistance assassinated Reinhard Heydrich, and in reprisal German forces murdered the population of a whole village, Lidice. In the spring of 1945, there were death marches of prisoners of several subcamps of the Flossenbürg, Gross-Rosen and Buchenwald concentration camps in Saxony and Silesia, and Allied POWs from camps in Austria reached the region.

In May 1945, Allied American, Polish, Czechoslovak, Soviet and Romanian troops captured the region, which was then restored to Czechoslovakia. After the war ended in 1945, after initial plans to cede lands to Germany or to create German-speaking cantons had been abandoned, the vast majority of the Bohemian Germans were expelled by order of the reestablished Czechoslovak central government, based on the Potsdam Agreement. The Bohemian Germans' property was confiscated by the Czech authorities, and according to contemporary estimates, amounted to a third of the Czechoslovak national income. Germans who were valued for their skills were allowed to stay to pass on their knowledge to the Czech migrants. The expulsion severely depopulated the area, and from then on, locales were called only their Czech names, regardless of their previous demographics. The resettlement of the formerly German-settled areas allowed many poorer people to acquire property, thus "equalizing" Czechoslovak society.

The Bohemian Romani local dialect became extinct because of the Nazi mass murder against Roma in the region.

=== Recent history ===
The Communist Party won the most votes in free elections, but not a simple majority. Klement Gottwald, the communist leader, became prime minister of a coalition government.

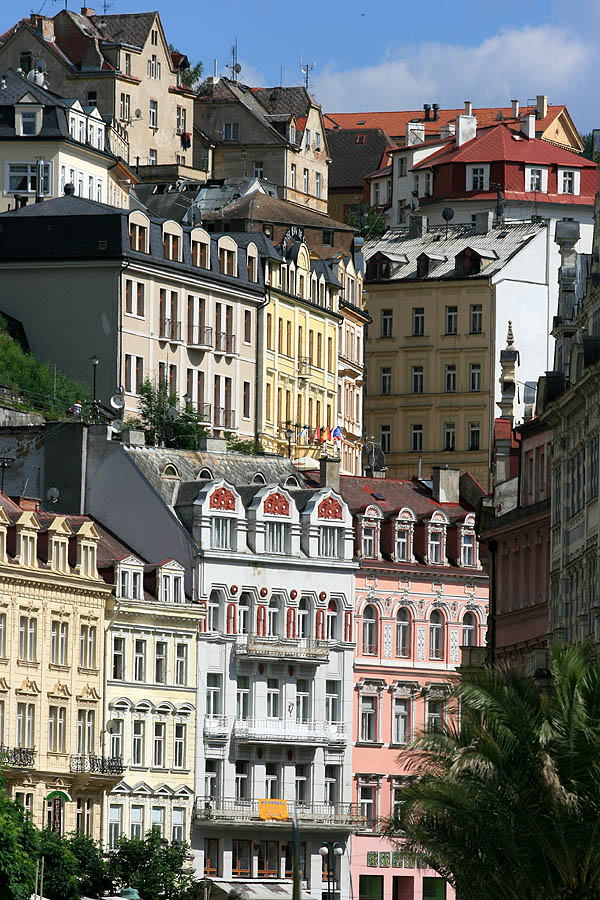
Bohemian city Karlovy Vary

In February 1948, the non-communist members of the government resigned in protest against arbitrary measures by the communists and their Soviet protectors in many of the state's institutions. Gottwald and the communists responded with a coup d'état and installed a pro-Soviet authoritarian state. In 1949, Bohemia ceased to be an administrative unit of Czechoslovakia, as the country was divided into administrative regions that did not follow the historical borders.

In 1989, Agnes of Bohemia became the first saint from a Central European country to be canonized (by Pope John Paul II) before the "Velvet Revolution" later that year.

After the Velvet Divorce in 1993, the territory of Bohemia remained in the Czech Republic. The new Constitution of the Czech Republic provided for higher administrative units to be established, providing for the possibility of Bohemia as an administrative unit, but did not specify the form they would take. A 1997 constitutional act rejected the restoration of self-governing historical Czech lands and decided on the regional system that has been in use since 2000. Petr Pithart, former Czech prime minister and president of the Senate at the time, remained one of the main advocates of the land system, claiming that the primary reason for its refusal was the fear of possible Moravian separatism.

Bohemia thus remains a historical region, and its administration is divided between Prague and the Central Bohemian, Plzeň, Karlovy Vary, Ústí nad Labem, Liberec, and Hradec Králové regions, as well as most of the Pardubice and South Bohemian region, and parts of the Vysočina and South Moravian regions. In addition to their use in the names of the regions, the historical land names remain in use in names of municipalities, cadastral areas, railway stations and geographical names. The distinction and border between the Czech lands is also preserved in local dialects.

In April 2025, a significant gold treasure was unearthed in north-eastern Bohemia, beneath Zvičina Hill. The hoard, weighing approximately 7 kilograms (15 lb), includes nearly 4 kilograms (8.8 lb) of gold coins, with an estimated value exceeding CZK 7.5 million. Discovered hidden in a forested area, this find is considered one of the most remarkable in recent Czech history. The coins are believed to date back to the 18th and 19th centuries, offering valuable insights into the region's historical economy and trade practices. The discovery is currently under examination by experts to determine its origins and historical significance.

== Former parts ==
=== Žitava ===
Zittau (Czech: Žitava) and Ostritz (Czech: Ostřice) in modern south-eastern Saxony were initially a part of Bohemia in the Middle Ages (and briefly Lower Silesia in 1319–1346). Žitava was a Bohemian royal city, granted city rights by King Ottokar II of Bohemia in 1255. In 1346, it co-formed the Lusatian League along with five most dominant Upper Lusatian cities, which were also under Bohemian rule, and had closer economic interests with those cities since. Žitava was not formally annexed from Bohemia to Upper Lusatia, however, it shared the history of Upper Lusatia since, and was annexed from the Kingdom of Bohemia by the Electorate of Saxony in 1635. The coat of arms of Zittau is a remnant of the city's ties to both Bohemia and Lower Silesia, as it contains the Bohemian lion and the Lower Silesian Piast Eagle.

In 1945, some 4,000 Czechs were registered in Zittau, and formed a Czech National Committee. The Czechs made an attempt to reintegrate the city with Bohemia, and thus Czechoslovakia, but the efforts were decisively rejected in 1948.

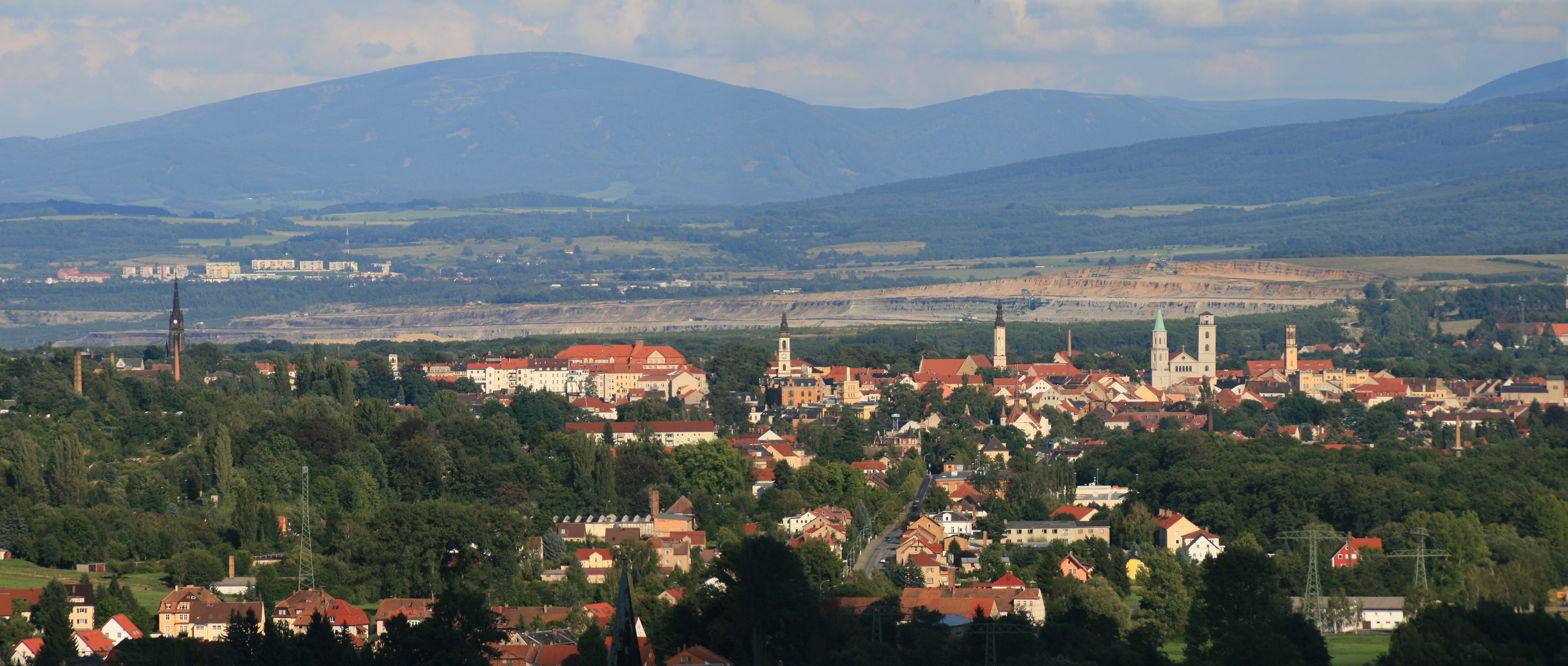
A panorama of Zittau

=== Kladsko ===
The area around Kłodzko (Czech: Kladsko; Latin: Glacio) in south-western Poland was culturally and traditionally a part of Bohemia but was also a part of Lower Silesia under rule of the Polish Piast dynasty in 1278–1290 and 1327–1341. Kłodzko Land has been again a part of Lower Silesia since its conquest by the Kingdom of Prussia in 1763. Referred to as "Little Prague", the Kłodzko Valley region on the Nysa Kłodzka River was the focus of several attempts to reincorporate the area into Czechoslovakia, one of several Polish–Czechoslovak border conflicts.

The last attempt occurred in May 1945, when Czechoslovakia tried to annex the area. The Czechs argued that because of the small Czech minority present in the western part of the Kłodzko Valley, which was called the region's "Czech Corner", the area should go over to Czechoslovakia instead of being assigned to Poland, as no relevant Polish minority lived in the area. Pressure brought on by the Soviet Union led to a ceasing of military operations, with the Czech minority being expelled to Germany and Czechoslovakia. According to canon law of the Roman Catholic Church, the area remained part of the Roman Catholic Archdiocese of Prague until 1972.

Capitalizing on interest regarding the Kladsko area in the Czech national psyche, a special tourist area in the Náchod District has been designated as the Kladsko Borderland Tourist Area (tourism district; Czech: turistická oblast Kladské pomezí). The area, entirely within the Czech Republic, was formerly known as the Jirásek's Region (Czech: Jiráskův kraj), Adršpach rocks (Czech: Adršpašské skály).

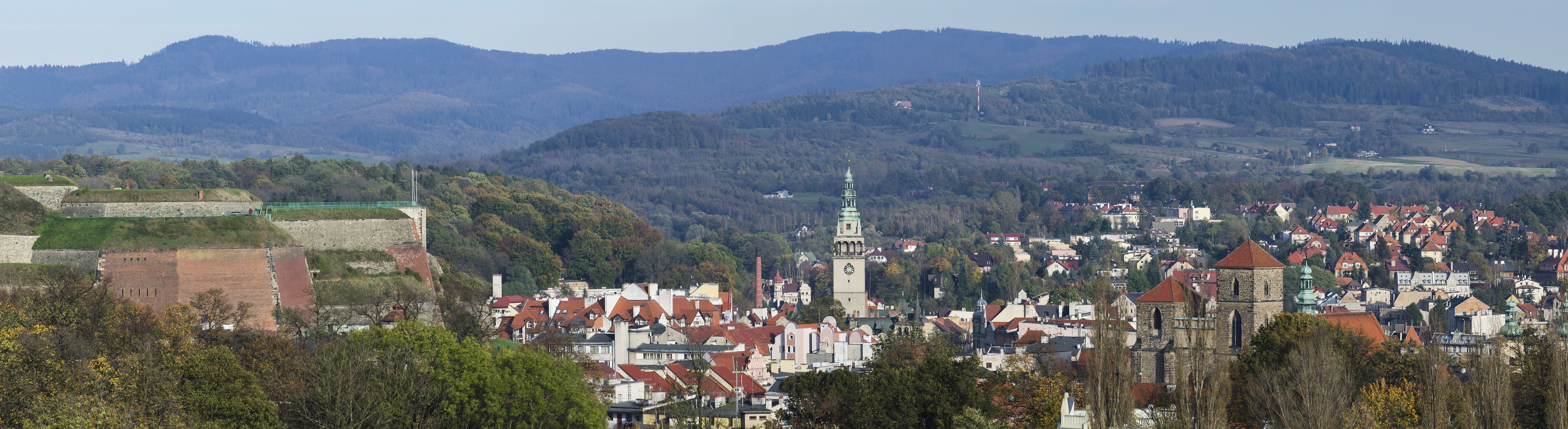
A panorama of Kłodzko, the capital city of Kłodzko Land, which is referred to as "Little Prague"

== Historical administrative divisions ==
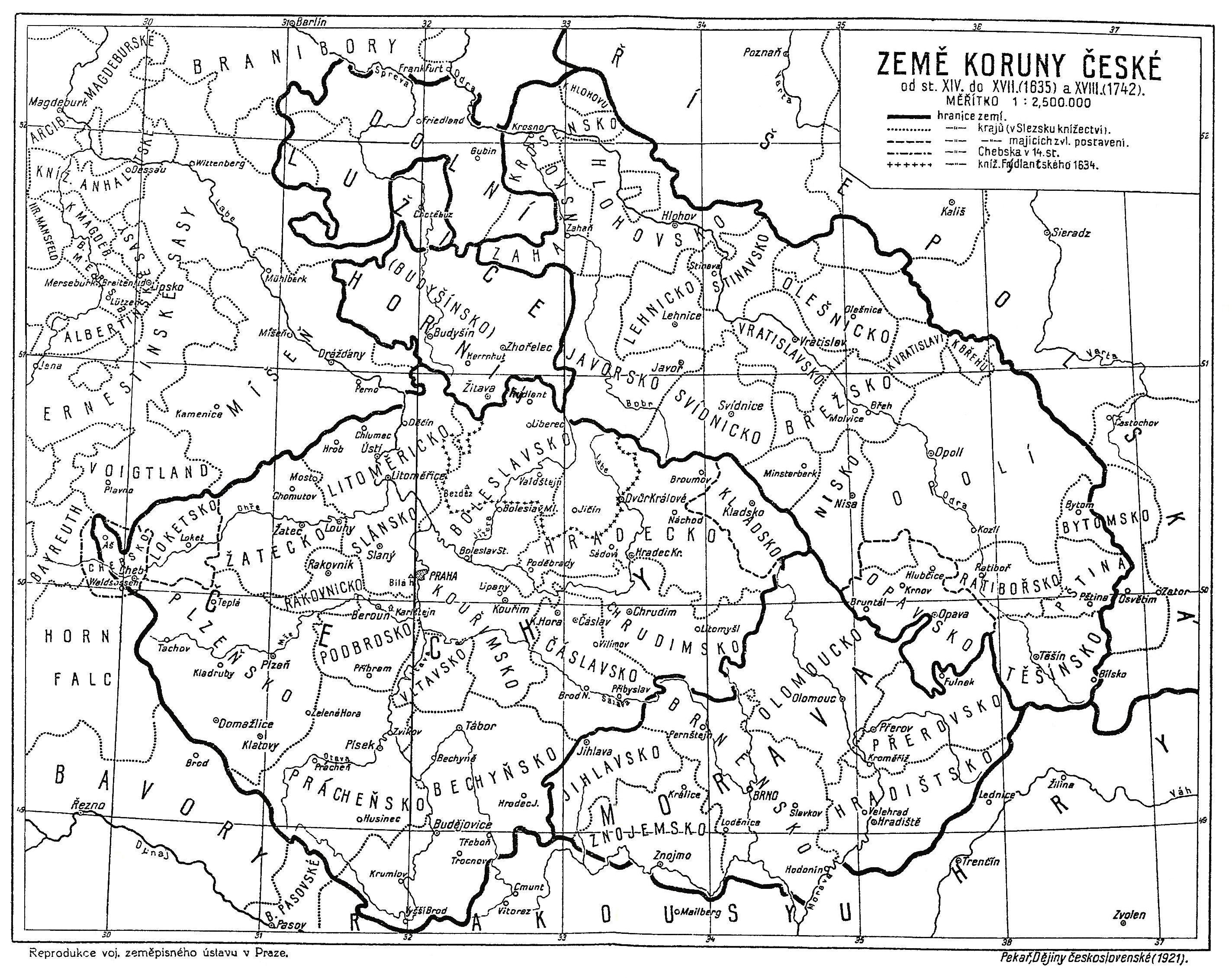
Lands of the Bohemian Crown (until 1635), map by Josef Pekař, 1921

Kraje of Bohemia during the Kingdom of Bohemia:

- Bechyně (German: Beching)
- Boleslav (German: Jungbunzlau)
- Čáslav (German: Tschaslau)
- Chrudim
- Hradec Králové (German: Königgrätz)
- Kladsko (German: Glatz)
- Kouřim at Prague (German: Prag)
- Litoměřice (German: Leitmeritz)
- Loket (German: Elbogen)
- Vltava (German: Moldau)
- Plzeň (German: Pilsen)
- Podbrdsko at Beroun (German: Beraun)
- Prácheň at Písek
- Rakovník (German: Rakonitz)
- Slaný (German: Schlan)
- Žatec (German: Saaz)

== See also ==
- Bohemianism
- Province of German Bohemia
- History of the Czech lands
- Kingdom Come: Deliverance
- Lech, Czech, and Rus'
- List of Bohemian monarchs
