= Auguste-Jean Gaudin =

French etcher

Auguste-Jean Gaudin (29 July 1914 – 23 May 1992) was a French painter and engraver. He was a pupil of Pierre Galle at the School of Fine Arts of Rennes.

== Biography ==
Gaudin was born on 29 July 1914 in Argentré-du-Plessis. From 17 April 1929 to 31 March 1930, employed by the merchant Zappone & Pénard, Rennes. From 1 April 1930 to 30 September 1931, he was employed by the merchant lingerie J. Even, Rennes. In 1933, he was a soldier in the first regiment of Zouaves in Casablanca. During World War II, he was a prisoner of war at the Stalag IV-C; this camp consisted of several districts including the Brüx Hydrierwerk. After the war, he married Jacqueline Auberty, assistant conservation at the Cabinet des Estampes et de la photographie, Paris.

== Public collections ==
- Douai, musée de la Chartreuse, Les Nouvelles écluses de Douai, oil on canvas sur toile, 1,00 x 0,81, signed, bought by the city before 1950.
- Rennes, musée des Beaux-arts, Près de Saint-Briac, drawing, 0,56 x 0,76, signed and dated 1959, bought by the city in 1959 .
- Nantes, musée des Beaux-arts, Ducasse de Gayant à Douai, artist's gift in 1989.
- Present location unknown : six works by the artist have been bought by the French State and are mentioned here
