= Pierre Capdevielle (musician) =

French musician (1906–1969)

Pierre Capdevielle (1 February 1906 – 9 July 1969) was a French conductor, composer, and music critic. In 1938 he was awarded the Prix Blumenthal and in 1948 he founded the Centre de documentation de musique internationale. For many years he was President of France's chapter of the International Society for Contemporary Music. He also served on the music council of UNESCO. In 1961 he was made a Chevalier of the Order of the Légion d'honneur.

== Life and career ==
Born in Paris, Capdevielle studied at the Conservatoire de Paris from 1924 to 1926. While there he was a pupil of Armand Ferté (piano), André Gedalge (counterpoint and fugue), Isidor Philipp (piano), and Paul Vidal (composition). After leaving the conservatoire he studied privately with Vincent d'Indy.

During the 1930s, Capdevielle began working as an opera conductor with theatres in the French provinces. He also worked as a music critic for Monde musicale and Revue musicale. In 1942 he became a professor of chamber music at the Conservatoire de Paris and also served on the school's jury of examiners. In 1944 he was appointed the Radiodiffusion-Télévision Française's director of the chamber music. He formed a special chamber orchestra at the RTF in 1952 with whom he conducted concerts on tour throughout Europe up through 1964. He died in Bordeaux at the age of 63.

== Music ==
His entry in The New Grove Dictionary of Music and Musicians describes his music as "the expression of a stormy, romantic temperament, moderated somewhat in the manner of Albert Roussel", noting his like for literary allusions, as in the rhythmically complex overture Le pédant joue of 1943 which calls on both orchestral and local percussion instruments to evoke the subject matter of the comedy by Cyrano de Bergerac. His Concerto del dispetto of 1959 integrates serialism and polytonality.

=== Works ===
==== Operas ====
- Les Amants captifs, a mythe lyrique with a libretto by Paul Guth
- Fille de l'Homme, tragédie lyrique, Paris, Radiodiffusion-Télévision Française, 9 November 1967

==== Orchestral ====
- Incantation pour la mort d'un Jeune Spartiate (1931; revised 1939)
- 3 symphonies (1936; 1942; da camera 1952-1953)
- Ouverture pour le pédant joué (1943)
- Epaves retrouvées, (composed 1952-1956)
- Moliera, suite symphonique (1947)
- Concerto del dispetto for piano and orchestra (1959)

==== Chamber music ====
- Trois pièces brèves for violin and piano (1948)
- Sonata da camera for violin and cello (1952)
- Élégie de Duino for Horn and Piano (1960)
- Sonate pour alto et piano
- Sonatina pastorale for flute and viola (1964)

==== Choral and vocal music ====
- De profundis for tenor and organ (1939)
- La Tragédie de Pérégrinos for narrator, chorus and orchestra on a text by Charles Exbrayat (1941) inspired by the pamphlet Lucian, created for Concerts Pasdeloup
- L'ile Rouge, cantata (composed 1945-1946)
- Cantate de la France retrouvée, for tenor, male chorus and wind instruments (1946)
- Various songs, including settings of Apollinaire, Baudelaire, Rilke, etc
