= Hubert Yencesse =

French sculptor (1900–1987)

- Born: 28 April 1900; Paris, France
- Died: 4 October 1987 (aged 87); Dijon, Paris, France
- Known for: Sculpture Swimmer, Art Olympics, 1948.

Hubert Yencesse (28 April 1900 – 4 October 1987) was a French sculptor. He secured 3rd place (Bronze Medal) in the Art Olympics of the year 1948 for his sculpture Swimmer. His first exhibition was in the year 1921 at the Salon d'Automne, and in the year 1934 he received the Blumenthal prize.

== Early life ==
Hubert Yencesse was born in Paris on 28 April 1900, and entered the school of Fine Arts in Dijon in 1919. His father, the medallist Ovice Yencesse taught in the same school. Because of this, he met the sculptor François Pompon and became his pupil.

He was the father of the sculptor Dodie Yencesse, and the brother of the sculptor Jacques Yencesse. His wife Cécile Chambelland died in 1999.

== Career ==
Yencesse exhibited for the first time at the Salon d'Automne in 1921 and received the Blumenthal Prize in 1934. A little earlier, he was called upon to sculpt the left profile of aviator Georges Guynemer, with a view to making a bronze intended to decorate the facade of a monument erected on the military airfield of Ouges-Longvic in memory of the ace of war (monument inaugurated on 25 July 1932).

The purse associated with the prize allows him to settle in his Parisian workshop. He met Aristide Maillol, of which he became a disciple and collaborator until 1936. Like Maillol, Yencesse devoted himself entirely to the representation of the female body. He exhibited in Paris at the Petit Palais in 1935, at the Salon des Tuileries and participated in exhibitions of French sculpture in Amsterdam, Brussels, etc. He also obtained numerous public commissions: he participated in the decorations of the Palais de Chaillot in 1937, produced decorations for the University of Dijon in 1957, sculpted a War Memorial in Belfort in 1948. In 1953, he produced a new Monument to the dead for the city of Le Neubourg (Eure), replacing the old monument sculpted by Paul Landowski destroyed during the war.

He taught at the Beaux-Arts de Paris from 1950 to 1970 (César succeeded him). During these years, he assiduously frequented, charcoal in hand, the dance studios. He finds his art renewed by this influence: The study of dance, he writes, distances the sculptor from conventional and often worn plastic research; he discovers that a volume from the inside, bursting into space, has total plastic value.

In 1972, the Rodin museum in Paris devoted a retrospective to him.

He was received as a member of the Institute on 20 March 1974, at the headquarters of Henri Navarre in the sculpture section of the Academy of Fine Arts.

Yencesse died in Dijon, Paris on 4 October 1987, at the age of 87.

== Work ==
- Reclining woman, circa 1935, plaster, Paris, museum of modern art of the City of Paris
- Woman with the shell, 1937, bronze, Toulouse, National Veterinary School of Toulouse
- Flore, 1937, stone, Barentin, Hôtel de Ville
- Head of a young woman, 1937, bronze, Mont-de-Marsan, Musée Despiau-Wlérick
- Bust of a woman, before 1939, bronze, Boulogne-Billancourt, museum of the Thirties
- Bust of a young woman or Mademoiselle B., 1942, bronze, Nantes, Musée des Beaux-Arts
- La Musique, 1943, stone, current location unknown, formerly in Chartres, town hall
- Tourville, 1943, pierre, Coutances, town hall
- Diane et son arc, vers 1943, plaster, Roubaix, La Piscine, André-Diligent Museum of Art and Industry
- Diane et son arc, vers 1943, bronze, Paris, museum of modern art of the City of Paris
- Diane et son arc, 1943, bronze, Dijon, Musée des Beaux-Arts
- Bust of Paul Langevin, 1946, bronze, Paris, Rectorat d'Académie
- La République, 1949, stone, Orleans
- Monument to the dead, 1953, stone, Le Neubourg
- The month of May 1956, stone, Fontainebleau, national castle museum
- The Immaculate Conception, 1957, Laguiole, Saint-Matthieu church
- Rock'n'Roll, 1962, bronze, The Water Gardens, Hemel Hempstead, Hertfordshire
- Rock'n'Roll, 1962, bronze, Elizabeth, South Australia
- La Loire, 1980, bronze, Orléans, place Sainte-Croix
- Spring, Summer, Autumn, plaster, Roubaix, La Piscine, André-Diligent Museum of Art and Industry
- Woman's head, gilt plaster, Strasbourg, museum of modern and contemporary art
- Swimmer, bronze, Algiers, Museum of Fine Arts

== Bibliography ==
Jean-Claude Pallas, History and architecture of the Palais des Nations, 1924–2001: art deco in the service of international relations, United Nations Publications, 2001, p. 228.

Cécile Goldscheider, "A dynasty of artists in Burgundy in the 20th century: the Yencesse", in Living in Burgundy, n ° 13, 1979, pp. 14–15.

André Warnod, Robert Couturier, René Barotte, Hubert Yencesse, cat. exp. Paris, Rodin Museum, 1972–1973, Paris, 1972.
