= George Blumenthal House =

Demolished mansion in Manhattan, New York

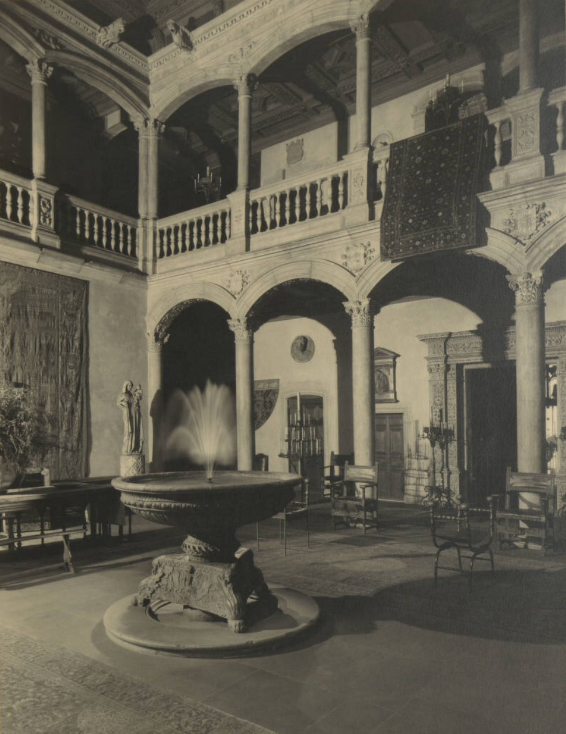
- The George Blumenthal House in the 1920s
- Interactive map of the George Blumenthal House area

General information
- Location: 50 East 70th Street, New York City, United States
- Coordinates: 40°46′11.93″N 73°57′55.8″W
- Named for: George Blumenthal
- Demolished: 1945

Technical details
- Floor count: 4 (George Blumenthal House); 20 (apartment complex)

Design and construction
- Architect: Trowbridge & Livingston

The George Blumenthal House was a mansion at 50 East 70th Street on the Upper East Side of Manhattan in New York City. It was constructed for George Blumenthal, wife of Florence Meyer Blumenthal.

== History ==
The 4-story mansion was designed by Trowbridge & Livingston, and featured limestone facing. During Prohibition, the building operated as a speakeasy until it was raided by the New York City Police Department in 1932. It was later sold to the Metropolitan Museum of Art. The building was demolished in 1945, and a 20-story apartment was built on the property.
