= André Brasilier =

French painter and lithographer (1929–2026)

- Born: 29 October 1929; Saumur, France
- Died: 4 September 2026 (aged 96); Paris, France
- Education: Beaux-Arts de Paris
- Occupations: Painter; Lithographer

André Brasilier (French: [ɑ̃dʁˈe bʁaziljˈe]; 29 October 1929 – 4 September 2026) was a French painter and lithographer.

His works are notably in the permanent collections of the Musée des Beaux-Arts de Brest.

Brasilier died in Paris on 4 September 2026, at the age of 96.

== Awards ==
- Prix Florence-Blumenthal (1952)
- Prix de Rome in Painting (1953)
- Prix Charles-Morellet of the Salon de la Jeune Peinture (1961)
