= Ida Gotkovsky =

French composer and pianist (1933–2025)

Ida Rose Esther Gotkovsky (26 August 1933 – 15 October 2025) was a French composer and pianist. She was a professor of music theory at the Conservatoire National Superieur de Musique in France.

== Early life ==
Gotkovsky was born in Calais on 26 August 1933. Her father was the violinist Jacques Gotkovsky of the Loewenguth Quartet and her mother also played the violin. Both her brother Ivar (a pianist) and her sister Nell (a violinist) became accomplished musicians. Gotkovsky began composing at the age of eight. She studied at the Paris Conservatoire, where her teachers included Olivier Messiaen and Nadia Boulanger.

She won six prestigious first prize music awards for her compositions, including the Prix Blumenthal (1958), Prix Pasdeloup (1959), Prix de Composition Concours International de Divonne les Bains (1961), Médaille de la Ville de Paris (1963), Grand Prix de la Ville de Paris (1966) and the Prix Lili Boulanger (1967).

== Compositions ==
Gotkovsky's output includes chamber music, symphonies, instrumental music, vocal music, ballets, and operas. Notably, she has contributed many solo and chamber pieces for the saxophone. Her Concerto for Trombone (1978) has been compared to Messiaen, and her Suite for Tuba and piano (1959) reveals the influence of Hindemith. She is also recognized for having written important works for band.

Gotkovsky's music credo is: "To create a universal musical art and to realize the oneness of musical expression through the ages by means of a contemporary musical language with powerful structures."

== Death ==
Gotkovsky died on 15 October 2025, at the age of 92.

== Selected works ==
Stage

- Le Rêve de Makar, opera in eight scenes (1964)
- Rien ne va plus, Ballet (1968)
- Le Cirque, Ballet (1972)
- Le Songe d'une nuit d'hiver, opera (1989)

Orchestra

- Scherzo (1956)
- Symphonie pour cordes et percussion (Symphony for Strings and Percussion) (1957)
- Jeu (1957)
- Escapades (1958)
- Jongleries (1959)
- Funambules (1960)
- Symphonie pour vingt-quatre instruments à vent (Symphony for twenty four wind instruments) (1960)
- Concerto pour orchestre symphonique (1970)
- Musique en couleur (1970)
- Poème symphonique (1973)
- Symphonie de printemps (Spring Symphony) for orchestra (1973) or wind orchestra (1988)
- Poème du feu (Poem of Fire) for wind orchestra (1978)
- Danses rituelles for wind orchestra (1988)
- Brillante symphonie for wind orchestra (1988–1989)
- Choral for orchestra or wind orchestra (1989)
- Couleurs en musique for orchestra or wind orchestra (1992)
- Fanfare for wind orchestra (1992)
- Or et lumière (Gold and Light) for orchestra (1992) or wind orchestra (1993)
- Symphonie à la jeunesse (Youth Symphony) for orchestra or wind orchestra (1993)
- Joyeuse symphonie for wind orchestra (2000)

Concertante

- Concerto for trumpet (1960)
- Concerto No. 1 for trumpet and orchestra (1962)
- Concerto for saxophone and orchestra (1966)
- Concerto for clarinet and orchestra (1968) or clarinet and wind orchestra (1997)
- Concerto for 2 violins and orchestra (1971)
- Variations concertantes for bassoon and orchestra (1972–1973)
- Concerto No. 2 for trumpet and orchestra (1973)
- Concerto for piano and orchestra (1975)
- Concerto for cello and orchestra (1977–1980)
- Concerto for trombone and wind orchestra (1978)
- Concerto for saxophone and large orchestra (1980)
- Concerto lyrique for clarinet and orchestra (1982) or clarinet and wind orchestra (1994)
- Symphonie for organ and wind orchestra (1982)
- Variations pathétiques for saxophone and orchestra (1983)
- Concerto for horn and orchestra (1984)

Chamber music

- Trio d'anches (Trio for Reed Instruments) (1954)
- String Quartet (1955)
- Danse russe for violin and piano (1957)
- Suite pour dix instruments (Suite for Ten Instruments) (1959)
- Caractères for violin and piano (1970)
- Éolienne for flute (or saxophone, or clarinet) and harp (or piano) (1970)
- Mélodie for flute and piano (1970–1985)
- Barcarolle for oboe and piano (1970–1985)
- Chanson for clarinet and piano (1970–1985)
- Allegro giocoso for bassoon and piano (1970–1985)
- Ritournelle for trumpet and piano (1970–1985)
- Romance for trombone and piano (1970–1985)
- Baladins for tuba and piano (1970–1985)
- Lied for bass trombone and piano (1970–1985)
- Brillance for alto saxophone and piano (1974)
- Sonata for violin and piano (1976)
- Images de Norvège (Pictures of Norway) for clarinet and piano (1977)
- Capriccio for violin and piano (1981)
- Invocation lyrique (Incantations Lyriques?) for viola and piano (1983)
- Variations pathétiques for alto saxophone and piano (or orchestra) (1983)
- Quatuor de saxophones for four saxophones (1983)
- Sonata for clarinet solo (1984)
- Trio for violin, clarinet and piano (1984)
- Trio lyrique for violin, alto saxophone and piano (1984)
- Inventions for baritone saxophone and piano (1988)
- Brass Quintet (1993)
- Quatuor de clarinettes for four clarinets (1998)

Keyboard

- Variation for piano (1956)
- Dasvidania for accordion (1962)
- Prélude for piano (1970)

Vocal

- Mélodies (1956)

Choral

- Chœur pour voix mixtes (chorus for mixed voices) (1954)
- Hommage à Baudelaire (1982)
- Le Chant de la forêt for chorus and wind orchestra (1989)
- Le Songe d'une nuit d'hiver for chorus and wind orchestra (1989)
- Oratorio olympique for chorus and wind orchestra (1991)
- Hommage à Jean de la Fontaine for children's chorus, mixed chorus and orchestra (1995)
