= Robert Louis Antral =

French painter and printmaker

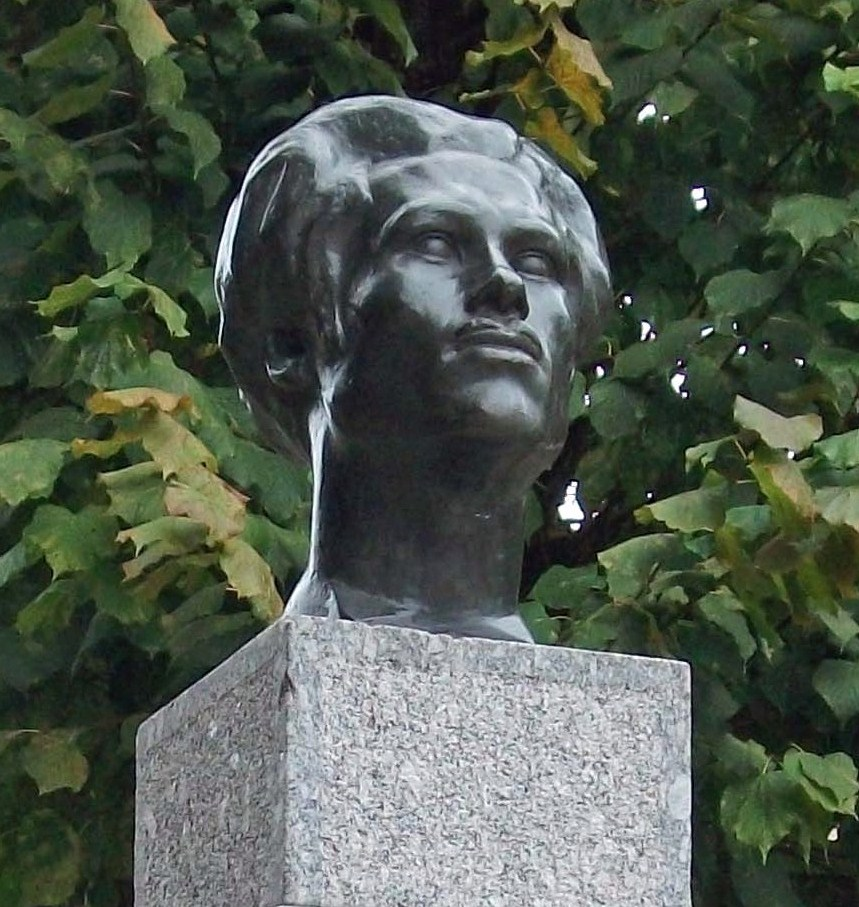
Bust of Antral in a park in Châlons.

Robert Antral (Châlons-en-Champagne July 13, 1895 – Paris June 7, 1939) was a French painter and printmaker, mainly of etchings. He won the Prix Blumenthal in 1926 and the Croix de Guerre for his bravery in World War I.

== Museums ==
- Musée d'art moderne de la ville de Paris.
- Musée des Beaux-Arts et d'Archéologie de Châlons-en-Champagne
- Musée des Beaux Arts de Nantes.
- Whitworth Art Gallery Manchester
- Musée de Lausanne
- Musée d'Alger
- Musée de Bilbao
