= Georges Migot =

French composer (1891–1976)

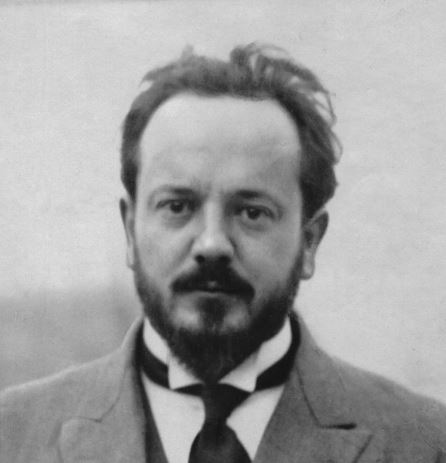
Georges Migot

Georges Elbert Migot (English: /miːˈɡoʊ/ mee-GOH, French: [ʒɔʁʒ ɛlbɛʁ miɡo]; 27 February 1891 – 5 January 1976) was a prolific French composer. Though primarily known as a composer, he was also a poet, often integrating his poetry into his compositions, and an accomplished painter. He won the 1921 Prix Blumenthal.

== Biography ==
Of a Protestant family, Migot was born in the 11th arrondissement of Paris on 27 February 1891. His father was a doctor and his mother gave him his first piano lessons when he was seven years old. He very quickly began to compose and, at age fifteen, he produced his first published work: Noël for four voices a cappella.

In 1909, he entered the Paris Conservatory and studied with Jules Bonval (harmony), André Gedalge (fugue), Charles-Marie Widor (composition), Alexandre Guilmant and Louis Vierne (organ), Vincent d'Indy (orchestration), Maurice Emmanuel (music history). He was passionate about Renaissance and Baroque lute players and composers, with François Couperin and Jean-Philippe Rameau becoming important sources of inspiration.

He was then mobilized during the First World War, and was seriously wounded in Longuyon (Meurthe et Moselle) in 1914. He had to use crutches during his convalescence, for more than a year.

He received several awards, including the Prix Lili Boulanger (1917), the Prix Lépaulle (1919), the Prix Halphen (1920) and the Prix Blumenthal (1921). However, he twice failed to win the Prix de Rome (in 1919 and 1922), and decided not to run again. He also studied painting, and his talent as a painter was showcased at several exhibitions in Parisian galleries in 1917, 1919 and 1923. He also wrote the libretti of many of his vocal works.

From 1937, Migot taught at the Schola Cantorum in Paris and also produced music programmes for Radio-Cité (1937–1939). In 1949, he became curator of the instrumental museum of the Paris Conservatoire, a position he held until 1961. The SACEM awarded him the Grand Prix de la musique française in 1958.

Migot died in Levallois-Perret (Hauts-de-Seine).

== Music ==
It is not easy to assess the prolific work of Georges Migot. He is credited with choosing difficult paths and rejecting banal solutions. Thus, Florent Schmitt wrote about his work Agrestides: "In all this work there is nothing low, banal or even easy. On the contrary, there are pure, noble, generous intentions, an intense poetic feeling. But impenitently self-taught, it seems that he approached his art by where he should have finished it." (Feuilleton musical du Temps, 23 May 1931). Some critics reproached him for having come to music through painting. As a musician, he knew how to translate the subtle play of colours with the help of sounds.

== Works ==
=== Dramatic ===
- Hugoromo, (Monte-Carlo, 9 May 1922)
- Le Rossignol en amour, chamber opera, libretto by Migot (1926–8; Geneva, 2 March 1937)
- Cantate d'Amour, opera, libretto by Migot (1949–50)
- La Sulamite, opera, libretto by Migot (1969–70)
- L'Arche, a "spatial polyphony" for soprano, women's chorus and orchestra, based on a poem by Migot (1971; Marseille, 3 May 1974)

=== Orchestral music: Symphonies ===
- No. 1 Les Agrestides (1919–1920; Paris, 29 April 1922)
- No. 2 (1927; Festival de Besançon, 7 September 1961)
- No. 3 (1943–9)
- No. 4 (1946–7)
- Sinfonia da chiesa pour instruments à vent (1955; Roubaix, 4 December 1955)
- No. 6 (for strings) (1944–51; Strasbourg, 12 June 1960)
- No. 7 (for chamber orchestra) (1948–52)
- No. 8 (for 15 wind instruments and 2 double basses)
- No. 9 (for strings) (incomplete)
- No. 10 (1962)
- No. 11 (for wind instruments) (1963)
- No. 12 (1954–64; Lille, 29 May 1972)
- No. 13 (1967)
- Petite symphonie en trois mouvements enchaînés pour orchestre à cordes (1970; Béziers, 23 July 1971)

=== Other orchestral works ===
- Le Paravent de laque aux cinq images (1920; Paris, 21 January 1923)
- La Fête de la bergère (1921; Paris: Théâtre Bériza, 21 November 1925)
- Trois Ciné-ambiances (1922)
- Suite for violin and orchestra (1924; Paris, 14 November 1925)
- Dialogue pour piano et orchestre (1922–5; Paris, 25 March 1924)
- Dialogue for cello and orchestra (1922–6; Paris, 7 February 1927)
- Suite for piano and orchestra (Paris, 12 March 1927)
- Suite en concert for harp and orchestra (Paris, 15 January 1928)
- La Jungle, for organ and orchestra (1928; Paris, 9 January 1932)
- Prélude pour un poète (Paris, 7 June 1929)
- Le Livre des danceries (Paris, 12 December 1931)
- Le Zodiaque (1931–9)
- Phonic sous-marine (1962)
- Concerto for piano and orchestra (1962; Paris, 26 June 1964)
- Concerto for harpsichord and chamber orchestra (Paris, 12 December 1967)

=== Chamber music ===
- Trio for oboe, violin and piano (1906)
- Les Parques for 2 violins, viola and piano (1909)
- Sonata for violin and piano (1911)
- Au bord de l'Eure. 5 Aquarelles for violin, viola and piano (1917)
- Trio for violin, viola et piano (1918)
- 3 string quartets (1921, 1957, 1962)
- Dialogue No. 1 for cello and piano (1922)
- Dialogue No. 1 for violin and piano (1923)
- Dialogue No. 2 for violin and piano (1925)
- Quartet for 2 clarinets, basset horn and bass clarinet (1925)
- Dialogue No. 2 for cello and piano (1929)
- Suite for solo flute (1931)
- Trio avec piano (1935)
- Trio for oboe, clarinet and bassoon (1944)
- String trio (1944–5)
- Sonata for flute and piano (1945)
- Sonate luthée for solo harp (1949)
- Pastorale for 2 flutes (1950)
- 2 sonatas for solo violin (1951, 1959)
- Sonate for solo clarinet (1953)
- Sonata for solo bassoon (1953)
- Quintet for flute, oboe, clarinet, horn and double bass (1954)
- Sonata for solo cello (1954)
- Saxophone quartet (1955)
- Quartet for 2 violins and 2 cellos (1955)
- Sonata for solo viola (1958)
- Sonata for cello and piano (1958)
- Quartet for flute, violin, cello and piano (1960)
- Sonata for guitar and piano (1960)
- Quartet for violin, viola, cello and piano (1961)
- Sonata for 2 cellos (1962)
- Suite for cor anglais and piano (1963)
- Introduction for a chamber concert of 5 wind instruments (1964)
- Trio for flute, cello and harp (1965)
- Prelude for two guitars (1968)

=== Vocal music ===
- Cortège d'Amphitrite (Albert Samain), for 4 voices et 4 string instruments
- 7 Petites images du Japon, for voice and piano (1917)
- Vini vinoque amor (L'Amour du vin et par le vin), for 2 voices, flute, cello and piano (1937)
- 6 Tétraphones (G. Migot), for bariton, flute, violin and cello (1945)
- L'Annonciation, oratorio (1943–6)
- La Mise au Tombeau (G. Migot), oratorio for small chorus and wind quintet (1948–9)
- Cantate d'amour (G. Migot), concert opera (1949–50)
- Mystère orphique, for voice and orchestra (1951; Strasbourg, 18 March 1964)
- La Résurrection, oratorio (1953; Strasbourg, 28 March 1969)
- La Nativité de Notre Seigneur (G. Migot), mystery play for soloists, chorus and instruments (1954)
- La Passion, oratorio in 12 episodes (1939–46; Paris, 25 July 1957)
- Du ciel et de la terre, "symphonie spatiale pour un film" (1957)
- Liturgie œcuménique, for 3 voices and organ (1958)
- Chansons de Margot (Philéas Lebesque)
- Psaume XIX, for chorus and orchestra
- numerous vocal trios and quartets a cappella
- Saint Germain d'Auxerre
- Le Zodiaque chorégraphie lyrique (G. Migot) (1958–60)
- La Plate, vaste savane, for soprano and instruments (1967)
- 3 Chansons de joie et de souci, for voice and guitar (1969)
- 3 Dialogues, for voice and cello (1972)
- 5 Chants initiatiques, for voice and piano (1973)
- large number of liturgical music

== Bibliography ==
- Léon Vallas: Georges Migot (Paris, 1923)
- Pierre Wolff: La Route d'un musicien: Georges Migot (Paris, 1933) and Georges Migot, étude générale (Paris, Leduc 1933)
- Maurice Henrion: "La Musique vocale de Georges Migot", in Revue musicale (November 1946)
- Marc Honegger: "Georges Migot", in Revue musicale Suisse (1954) as well as editor of the Catalogue des œuvres musicales de Georges Migot (Strasbourg, 1977)
- Max Pinchard: Connaissance de Georges Migot musicien français (Les Éditions ouvrières, 1959)
- Alain Pâris: "Georges Migot", in Universalis (1977)
- C. Lathan (ed.): Georges Migot: the Man and his Work (Strasbourg, 1982)
- René Aigrin: "Le Psaume de Georges Migot", in La Vie Catholique, 30 April 1932
- Clarendon: "La Passion de Migot", in Le Figaro, 18 December 1946
- Paul Le Flem: "La Jungle", in Comœdia, 11 October 1932, as well as "Le Livre des Danceries" idem, 14 December 1931
