= Bernard Cathelin =

French painter

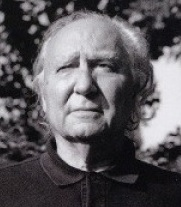
- Born: May 20, 1919; Paris, France
- Died: April 17, 2004 (aged 84); Paris, France
- Education: Ecole Nationale Supérieure des Arts Décoratifs
- Known for: Oil Paintings, Lithographs, Tapestries
- Movement: School of Paris
- Awards: Legion of Honour, France Blumenthal prize Emily Loewe

Bernard Cathelin (20 May 1919 – 17 April 2004) was a French painter born in Paris and a member of the School of Paris which included Picasso, Chagall, Frenel, Matisse, Dufy and many others including Maurice Brianchon, Cathelin's teacher at the Ecole Nationale Supérieure des Arts Décoratifs. Although he received critical acclaim as early as 1950, Cathelin was not able to live solely from his painting until 1955. Since that time Cathelin has received steadily increasing recognition and has been featured in over 50 exhibitions worldwide. Throughout his life, he maintained a deep-rooted love for his country and especially for the Drôme, where his mother came from.

== Early life ==
Born in Paris in 1919, Bernard Cathelin held a profound affection for his home, the Drome, his mother's place of origin, throughout his life. His educational journey included classical studies at the lycées Carnot and Janson de Sailly in Paris, as well as the lycée Emile Loubet in Valence.

In 1939, he enlisted in the army. Following his military service and return in 1945, Cathelin pursued studies at the French National School for further studies in the Decorative Arts. During this period, he also honed his craft in the studio of Maurice Brianchon for three years.

== Art ==
Cathelin part of the School of Paris was famous for oil paintings and lithographs with a richness of texture and vivid colour. The three favorite themes in Cathelin's work are still life, landscapes and portraits of women.

Cathelin had traveled extensively around the world. Countries such as Mexico, Russia, Japan, Italy and Spain were a source of inspiration for his creations: and ever the landscapes of the Drôme in and neighbouring Provence where he found his roots.

== Honors ==
Elected to the Legion of Honour by the French President of the Republic, François Mitterrand in 1995, the Musée de Valence dedicated him a retrospective of his work in the summer of 1997. This exhibition, by drawing local and worldwide visitors, established a new attendance record for the museum.

In the summer of 1997, the Musée de Valence paid tribute to Bernard Cathelin with a dedicated retrospective of his work. This exhibition attracted both local and international visitors, setting a new attendance record for the museum.

In 2000, the Shanghai Art Museum in China organised a retrospective exhibition presenting 40 years of Bernard Cathelin's works.

Bernard Cathelin died on 17 April 2004, but exhibitions are often dedicated to him in France and across the world.

== Biography ==
1939	Volunteer for service
1945-1953	Study then teach at the Ecole Nationale Supérieure des Arts Décoratifs, Paris, France
1950	Cathelin is awarded the Blumenthal prize
1951	Henri Matisse entrusts Cathelin with the production of a lithographic poster based on Nattier's portrait of Mme de Pompadour
1953	Awarded the Emily Loewe Prize
1954	Marries Régine Steiner
1957	First personal exhibition at the Saint-Placide Gallery in Paris
1958	Awarded the Othon Friesz Prize
	Selected by the David Findlay gallery for an exhibition in New York. On November 2, the New York Herald Tribune features him on Sunday's supplement's cover page
1960-1966	Several exhibitions at the David Findlay Gallery in New York and Marcel Guiot Gallery in Paris, France
1967	Trips to Russia and Japan. Exhibition at the Yoshii Gallery, Tokyo, Japan
1973	Creation of his first tapestry, The Mexican Market, by Atelier 3, Paris, France
1976	Madeleine Cathelin-Terrail donation: Bernard Cathelin gives 50 lithographs to the Valence Museum in memory of his mother
1978	Exhibition at the BP Gallery, Antwerp, Belgium
1980	Exhibition at the Chapelle du Grand Couvent, Cavaillon, France
1981	Exhibition in the Château de Vascueil, Normandy, France
1983	Exhibition at the Yoshii Gallery, Paris. Presentation of the book featuring to the 10 Haïkaï, E.F. Mourlot editions
	Exhibition at the Munson Gallery, Santa Fe, USA
1984	Exhibition at the Galerie Pierre Hautot, Paris, France
1985	Exhibition at the Pierre Granada Foundation, Martigny, Switzerland.
1986	Exhibition at the Denis Stinson Gallery, Palm Springs, USA
	Exhibition at the Mazarine Gallery, Montréal, Canada
1987	Major exhibition in the Château de Chenonceau, France
1988	Art Expo, New York
1989	Exhibition at Art London
	Exhibition at the Buschlen Mowatt Gallery, Vancouver, Canada
	Exhibition at the Hermann Gallery, Esse, Germany
	Exhibition at the Gage Gallery, Irving, Los Angeles, USA
1990	Exhibition at the Francony Gallery, Paris, France
	Exhibition at the Printemps Ginza Gallery, Tokyo, Japan
	Exhibition at the Kinetsu Gallery, Osaka, Japan
1991	Exhibition at the Art Chicago, Buschlen Mowatt Gallery, Chicago, USA
	Exhibition at Artfrance, Paris, France
1992	Edition of 8 lithographs to decorate the Shin Yokohama Prince Hotel, Japan
	Exhibition at the Elysium Gallery, New York, USA
	Awarded the "Golden 26" by the French département of the Drôme
	Elected painter for the Aix-en-Provence summer art festival
1993	Creation of a poster for the 10th Tain l'Hermitage Wine Festival
1994	Retrospective in the Daimaru Museum in Tokyo and Osaka, Japan
	Exhibition at Essec International Management Development, CNIT, Paris La Defense, France
1995	Elected to the Legion of Honour by the French President of the Republic, Mr François Mitterrand
	Exhibition at the Trianon de Bagatelle, Paris, France
1996	Art Miami, Buschlen Mowatt Gallery
	Exhibition at the Seita Museum, Paris, France
1997	Exhibition at the Europ'Art, Geneva International Art Fair, Switzerland
	Retrospective in the Valence Museum, France
1998	Exhibition at the Alliance Française in Singapore
	Exhibition of tapestries at the Wacoal Art Center in Tokyo, Japan
	Exhibition of tapestries and lithographs in Mitsukoshi, Sapporo, Japan
1999	Exhibition at the Philharmonic Center for Art in Naples, Florida, USA
2000	Retrospective Exhibition at the Shanghai Art Museum, China
2004	Bernard Cathelin died on April 17
