= Paule Marrot =

Textile designer

- Born: Paule Félicie Hélène Marrot; 17 April 1902; Bordeaux, France
- Died: 22 December 1987 (aged 85)
- Education: L’école des Arts Décoratifs
- Known for: Painting; Engraving; Textile Design
- Awards: Prix Blumenthal; Légion d'honneur Gold Medal, International Exhibition of Modern Decorative and Industrial Arts, Paris, 1925

Paule Marrot (French: [pol maʁo]; 17 April 1902 – 22 December 1987) was a Parisian textile designer widely known for her textile prints with a flat, two-dimensional, upbeat style — often with a floral pattern. She experienced strong popularity in the U.S. after World War II, worked with Renault to develop the company's textile and color division, and redefined furnishing fabrics in her native country of France.

Marrot won the gold medal in the textile category at the International Exhibition of Modern Decorative and Industrial Arts in Paris in 1925; the Prix Blumenthal in 1928; and was awarded the French Légion d'honneur (Legion of Honor), as Chevalier, in 1952. She was the subject of a 2017 retrospective at the Bordeaux Museum of Decorative Arts and Design with its exhibition, Oh Color! Design Through the Prism of Color, the curator calling Marrot "the Charlotte Perriand of Régie Renault."

== Early life ==
Paule Marrot was born Paule Félicie Hélène Marrot in Bordeaux on 17 April 1902, to a bohemian family with a musician father. Marrot attended L’école des Arts Décoratifs in Paris at age 14 and in 1917 apprenticed in engraving and textile printing with Pierre Léon Dusouchet. Marrot became a teacher and was selling some of her original textile designs when she met Raoul Dufy, a Fauvist painter, who in turn introduced her to Paul Poiret, a prominent fashion designer at the time — to whom Marrot subsequently sold a dress design — and ultimately fabric for his work.

== Career ==
In 1924 she was admitted to the Société des artistes décorateurs (Society of Decorative Artists), and married her childhood friend, Paul Angelloz, who became her business manager.

In 1925, Marrot shows printed fabrics at the Worlds Fair's International Exposition of Modern Industrial and Decorative Arts that showcases to her personality and new style which wins her a gold medal.

Winning the Prix Blumenthal in 1928 allowed Marrot to open her workshop in Batignolles on at 34 rue Truffaut, where she became widely known for furniture textiles.

In 1932 her work was exhibited in the Salon des Artistes Decorateurs show came to the attention of Jean Schlumberger, an Alsacian textile manufacturer with Manufacture Steiner de Ribeauvillé. Schlumberger became her exclusive printer and a devoted friend for 30 years until his death in 1963. Together they produced over 320 fabric designs and numerous table linens. Marrot moved her operation to rue des Arcades in 1936.

After the war, she reopened the rue des Arcades store and in 1945 resumed production with Ribeauvillé. Working with Margaret Owen, she established the import of her textiles to the USA — Jacqueline Kennedy subsequently designing a living room around Marrot's Les Tulipes cotton print. From 1953 to 1965, Marrot consulted with Renault, prioritizing color and fabric coordination for the company and establishing their interior and exterior paint and textile labs.

In May 1959, she exhibited her work at Stockholm's Artek gallery, which had distributed her line of 104 printed fabrics and 28 tablecloths since 1935. From 1961 to 1968 Marrot collaborated with Zofia Rostand, whose student she had been in 1960.

In 1973, Marrot exhibited 82 fabrics and tablecloths at the Exposition au Musée d’impression sur Etoffe de Mulhouse (Museum of Printed Textiles at Mulhouse), working with Fauve painter Raoul Dufy.

Paule Marrot died on 22 December 1987.

== Marrot at Renault ==
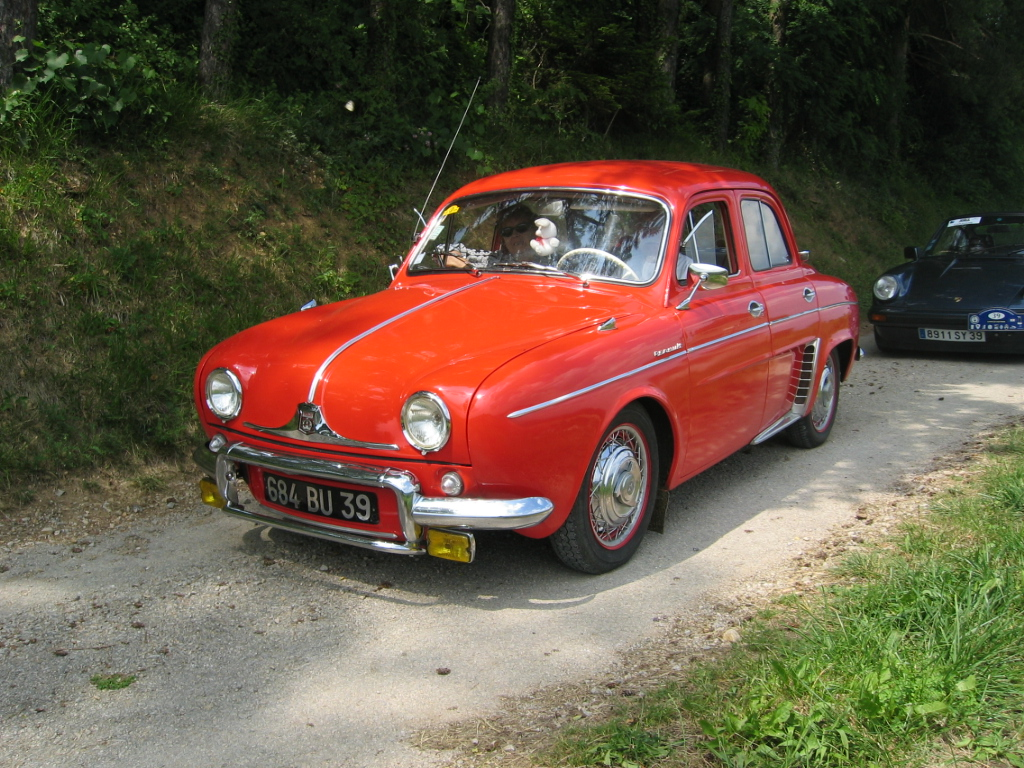
Marrot worked with Renault to develop its textile and paint division, transforming the color of its products from somber postwar colors to a fresh, vibrant palette

In 1950, the president of General Motors had visited automobile manufacturer Renault, noting the cars' drab colors, inside and out. According to Renault's own preliminary research for the upcoming Dauphine, a 1951 survey had shown that women held stronger opinions on a car's colors than the car itself. Coincidentally, Marrot had written a letter to Renault's chairman, Pierre Lefaucheux, giving her opinion that the postwar cars of Paris were a uniformly somber parade — and wondering whether an artist could not help find fresh, vibrant colors.

Convinced of her value to the project, Pierre Lefaucheux made her a member of the Dauphine team — "to rid Renault of their stuffy image. After decades of being dipped in various shades of black and grey, car bodies [would be] painted in happy pastels."

Working with four others, Marrot proposed new body and interior colors after setting up a new test laboratory to measure fabric wear as well as paint wear and uniformity. The new colors contrasted with the colors from the competition, the Peugeot 203 and Simca Aronde, including bright colors with evocative names including Rouge Montijo, Jaune Bahamas, Bleu Hoggar and Blanc Réja. Marrot and her team then developed complementary interior fabrics for the seats and door panels, turning to Paris' large textile houses.

Marrot also designed the Dauphine's emblem, with three dolphins over a crown, which would adorn the Dauphine's steering wheel and hood throughout its production. Over 2 million Dauphines were produced in its production run of 10 years, each bearing Marrot's imprint.

== Licensing and posthumous releases ==
1999 saw the creation of Editions Paule Marrot Ltd which became SAS Editions Paule Marrot in 2002, reissuing more than 700 fabrics from Marrot's career along with numerous tablecloths and towel designs, a total of more than 670 designs.

In 2005, Carolina Irving wrote a story about Marrot for Better Homes and Gardens and in 1997 the Museum of Printed Textiles at Mulhouse held a retrospective of her work.

Marrot designs have since been used extensively under license by companies as diverse as Nike, Anthropologie and the handbag maker, Hayden-Harnett. In 1952, she won the Legion of Honor.

== See also ==
- Renault Dauphine
- Légion d'honneur (Legion of Honor)
- Prix Blumenthal
