= Émile Damais =

French composer and musicologist

Émile Damais (4 March 1906 in Paris – 8 April 2003 in Ivry-sur-Seine) was a French composer and musicologist. A prisoner in the Stalag II B, Hammerstein / Schlochau (Poland) during the Second World War, he composed there Ô nuit… for singing and orchestra. He was also a professor of music history.

== Compositions ==
- Sonata for violon
- Appassionato for doublebasse and piano
- O Nuit... for singing and orchestra (after the Mystère des saints innocents by Charles Péguy composed in the stalag in February 1942
- String quartet (1944).
- Symphonic sketch for saxophone and orchestra
- Concert Esquisse Symphonique for saxophone in Eb and piano
- 5 divertissements pourophone for alto saxophone in Eb solo
- Litanies florales, mélody for voice and piano
- Petites Phrases for violin and piano on Amazon
- Motets published by the Schola Cantorum publishing department in Paris
- Passion according to Saint Matthew, premiered in Limoges in 1948
- Oratorio on a text by Paul Claudel, Le Chemin de la Croix for mixed choirs, large orchestra, solo soprano, tenor solo, bass and reciting, written during the war and given to the Concerts Pasdeloup in 1946
- Organ pieces like this Interlude for Christmas (Musique et Liturgie No 6, 1948)

== Works ==
- Damais, Émile (1970). Haendel. Classiques Hachette de la musique. Paris: Hachette. p. 89. ISBN 8423953181.
