= Stalag IV-C =

German World War II prisoner-of-war camp

- Bystřice, German-occupied Czechoslovakia (now Czech Republic)

Site information
- Type: Prisoner-of-war camp
- Controlled by: Nazi Germany

Location
- Czech Republic
- Coordinates: 50.6815°N 13.7882°E

Site history
- In use: 1941–1945
- Battles/wars: World War II

Garrison information
- Occupants: French, British, Dutch, Polish, American and Russian prisoners of war; Italian military internees

Stalag IV-C was a German World War II prisoner-of-war camp located in Bystřice (now part of the town of Dubí) in German-occupied Czechoslovakia (now the Czech Republic) in the Ore Mountains region.

== Camp history ==
The camp was opened in February 1941. The main camp was housed in a former porcelain factory. In 1943 fewer than 250 men were there, with the remaining population, some 23,000 men, attached to various Arbeitskommandos working in local industry and construction. The largest detachment, of 8,000 men, was at Brüx (now Most) working on the construction of the Sudetenländische Treibstoffwerke ("Sudetenland Fuel Works"), part of the state-owned industrial conglomerate Reichswerke Hermann Göring. This plant was designed to process oil from coal, and as part of the Allied campaign to attack German oil production it was bombed several times between July 1944 and April 1945. In the second raid on 21 July 1944 six British POWs were killed and 21 were injured. The camp was liberated by the Russian Army in May 1945.

== See also ==
- List of prisoner-of-war camps in Germany
