= William P. G. Harding =

American banker (1864–1930)

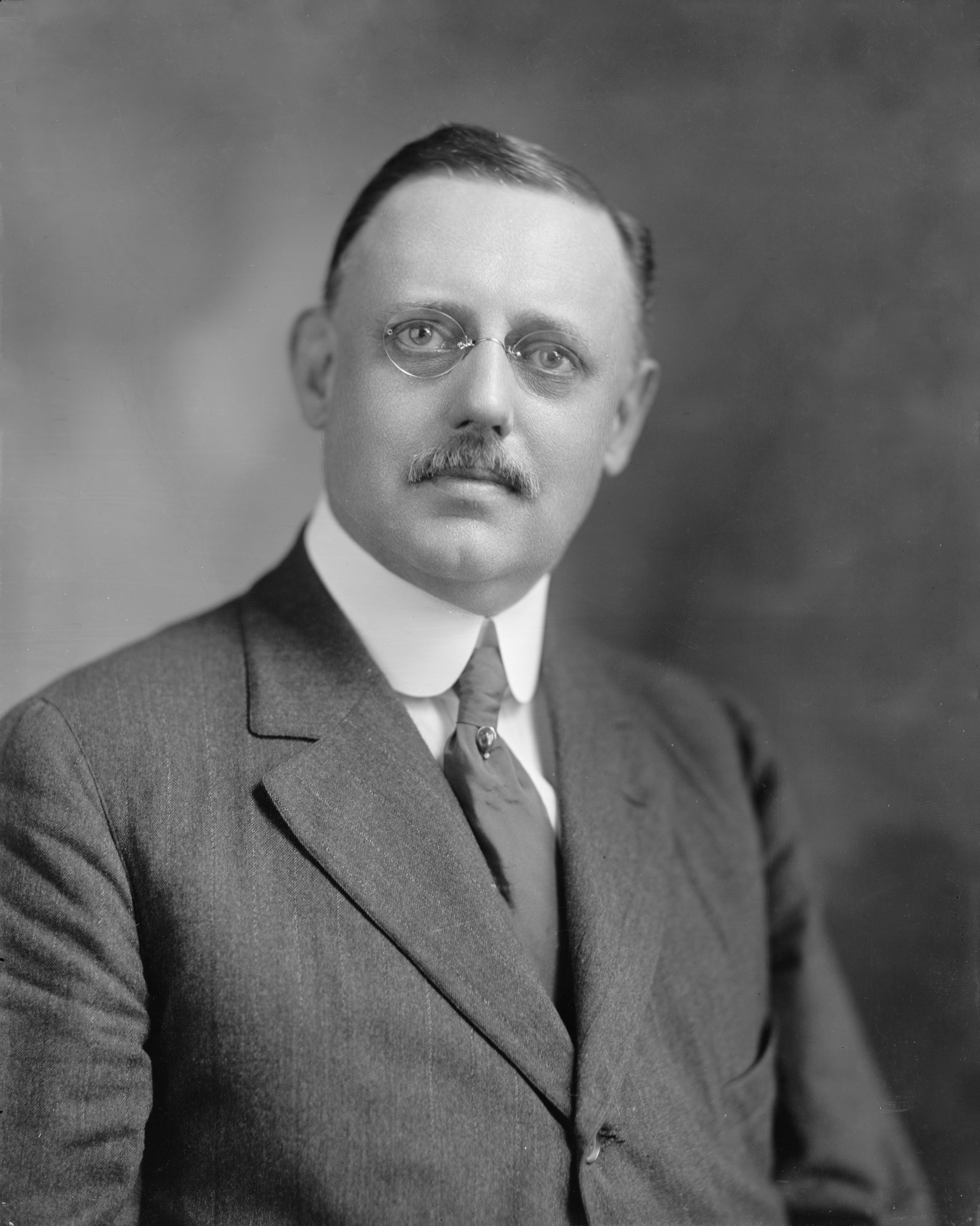

2nd Chairman of the Federal Reserve
- In office August 10, 1916 – August 9, 1922
- President: Woodrow Wilson; Warren G. Harding
- Deputy: Paul Warburg; Albert Strauss; Edmund Platt
- Preceded by: Charles Sumner Hamlin
- Succeeded by: Daniel Richard Crissinger

Member of the Federal Reserve Board
- In office August 10, 1914 – August 9, 1922
- President: Woodrow Wilson; Warren G. Harding
- Preceded by: Position established
- Succeeded by: Daniel Richard Crissinger

3rd President of the Federal Reserve Bank of Boston
- In office January 16, 1923 – April 7, 1930
- Preceded by: Charles Morss
- Succeeded by: Roy A. Young

Personal details
- Born: William Proctor Gould Harding; May 5, 1864 Boligee, Alabama, U.S.
- Died: April 7, 1930 (aged 65) Boston, Massachusetts, U.S.
- Party: Democratic
- Education: University of Alabama, Tuscaloosa (BA)

William Proctor Gould Harding (May 5, 1864 – April 7, 1930) was an American banker who served as the second chairman of the Federal Reserve from 1916 to 1922. Prior to his term as chairman, Harding served as one of the original members of the Federal Reserve Board, taking office in 1914. During his tenure as chairman, he concurrently served as the managing director of the War Finance Corporation from 1918 to 1919. After leaving the Fed, Harding traveled to Cuba and advised the Cuban government on the reorganization of its financial and accounting system.

He returned to United States a year later and was elected governor of the Federal Reserve Bank of Boston from 1923 until his death in 1930.

== Early life ==
Harding was born on May 5, 1864, to Horace Harding and Eliza Proctor Gould Harding in Boligee, Alabama. The portrait painter Chester Harding was a grandfather. He received his early education in Tuscaloosa, Alabama, and before entering the University of Alabama he received his preparatory support from many established and respected educators such as Dr. Warfield C. Richardson and Prof. Joseph M. Dill.

He entered the University of Alabama in 1878 and received a Bachelor of Arts in 1880 and continued his studies for an extra year to obtain a Master of Arts at the time becoming the youngest student to acquire his degree. He graduated from the University of Alabama in 1881 and further continued his studies again in business college at Poughkeepsie, New York.

== Career ==
He returned to Tuscaloosa and began working at J. H. Fitts and Company for three years as a bookkeeper and clerk. He then moved to Birmingham, Alabama, to work again as a bookkeeper for Berney National Bank where he was promoted to cashier three years later. In 1896, he was elected as vice-president of the First National Bank of Birmingham and then elected president on June 28, 1902.

Under his administration he was recognized as the most notable banker in the south and was recognized nationally. In 1913 he was elected as president of the Birmingham Chamber of Commerce.

== Later life ==
Harding relinquished his title when asked by President Woodrow Wilson to become a member of the Federal Reserve Board on August 10, 1914, before the onset of World War I. On August 10, 1916, he was appointed by Woodrow as a member of the Federal Reserve Board and was appointed director of the War Finance Corporation until 1922. In addition, the University of Alabama distinguished Harding with a degree of Legum Doctor in 1916.

In 1922 he was requested by the President of Cuba Alfredo Zayas y Alfonso to reorganize the country's financial and accounting systems. He returned to America in 1923 and was appointed as president of the Federal Reserve Bank of Boston where he served until his death on April 7, 1930 from heart failure after a long illness at his home in Boston, Massachusetts.

== Personal life ==
In October 1895 he was married to Amanda Moore, a granddaughter of Alabama congressman Sydenham Moore, and with her had three children before her death by suicide in 1910. His daughter Margaret also later committed suicide in 1924. Harding was a member of the Freemasonry fraternal organization and an Episcopalian.

Government offices
New office	Member of the Federal Reserve Board of Governors; 1914–1922	Succeeded by Daniel Richard Crissinger
Preceded by Charles Sumner Hamlin	Chairman of the Federal Reserve; 1916–1922	Succeeded by Daniel Richard Crissinger
Other offices
Preceded by Charles Morss	President of the Federal Reserve Bank of Boston; 1923–1930	Succeeded by Roy A. Young
