= Roy A. Young =

American business executive and banker (1882–1960)

Roy Young
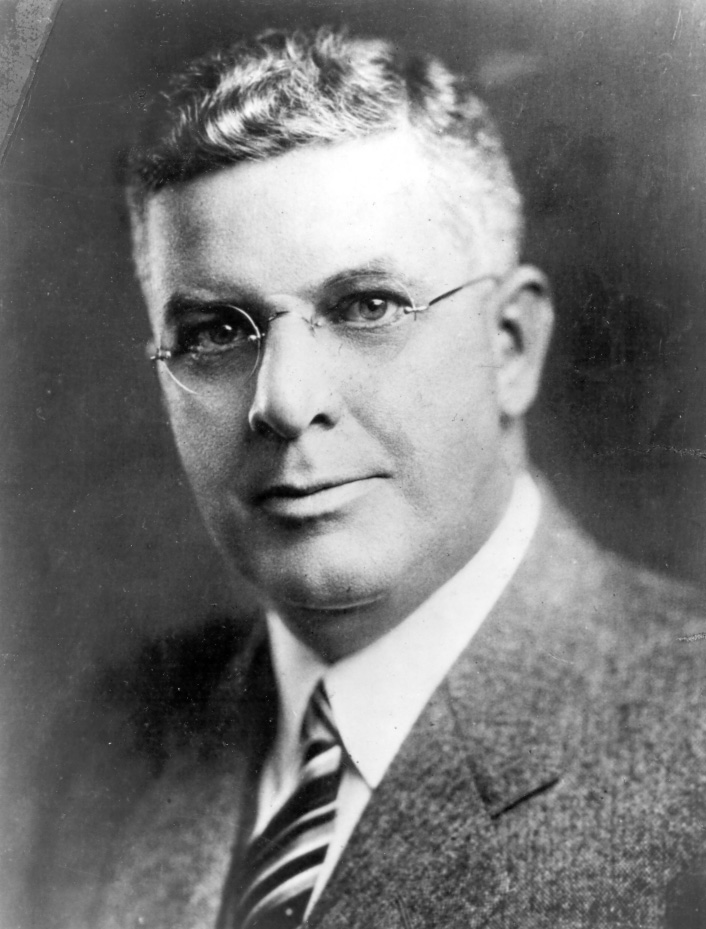

4th Chairman of the Federal Reserve
- In office October 4, 1927 – August 31, 1930
- President: Calvin Coolidge; Herbert Hoover
- Deputy: Edmund Platt
- Preceded by: Daniel Richard Crissinger
- Succeeded by: Eugene Meyer

Member of the Federal Reserve Board
- In office October 4, 1927 – August 31, 1930
- President: Calvin Coolidge; Herbert Hoover
- Preceded by: Daniel Richard Crissinger
- Succeeded by: Menc Szymczak

4th President of the Federal Reserve Bank of Boston
- In office September 1, 1930 – March 31, 1942
- Preceded by: William P. G. Harding
- Succeeded by: William Paddock

3rd President of the Federal Reserve Bank of Minneapolis
- In office October 1, 1919 – September 26, 1927
- Preceded by: Theodore Wold
- Succeeded by: W. B. Geery

Personal details
- Born: Roy Archibald Young; May 17, 1882 Marquette, Michigan, U.S.
- Died: December 31, 1960 (aged 78) Chestnut Hill, Massachusetts, U.S.
- Party: Republican
- Spouse: Amy Goodrich Bosson

Roy Archibald Young (May 17, 1882 – December 31, 1960) was an American banker who served as the 4th chairman of the Federal Reserve from 1927 to 1930. During his tenure as chairman, the Wall Street crash of 1929 occurred, which signaled the beginning of the Great Depression. Before and after his term at the Federal Reserve Board, Young also served as the president of the Federal Reserve Bank of Minneapolis from 1919 to 1927 and the Federal Reserve Bank of Boston from 1930 to 1942.

== Early life ==
Roy A. Young was born on May 17, 1882, to James Wilson Young a miller and millwright from Ontario, Canada and Julia Healy an Irish immigrant in Marquette, Michigan. Young was a messenger for a bank at the age of eight. He then worked as assistant cashier and joined the Citizens National Bank as vice president in 1913.

== Career ==
From 1919 to 1927 he was president of the Federal Reserve Bank of Minneapolis before becoming chairman of the Federal Reserve Board. From 1930 to 1942 he served as president of the Federal Reserve Bank of Boston. After his resignation, he changed to become chairman of the Merchants National Bank and later chairman of American Woolen Company.

During his term in office as chairman of the Federal Reserve Board there was confrontation between the Federal Reserve Board and the Federal Reserve Bank of New York under George L. Harrison of how to curb speculation that led among other things to the stock market boom of the late 1920s. The Board was in favor of putting "direct pressure" on the lending member banks while the Federal Reserve Bank of New York wanted to raise the discount rate.

The Board under Young disapproved this step, however Young himself was not fully convinced that the policy of using pressure would work and refused to sign the 1929 Annual Report of the Board because it contained parts favorable to this policy.

== Death ==
He died on December 31, 1960, in Chestnut Hill, Massachusetts.

== See also ==
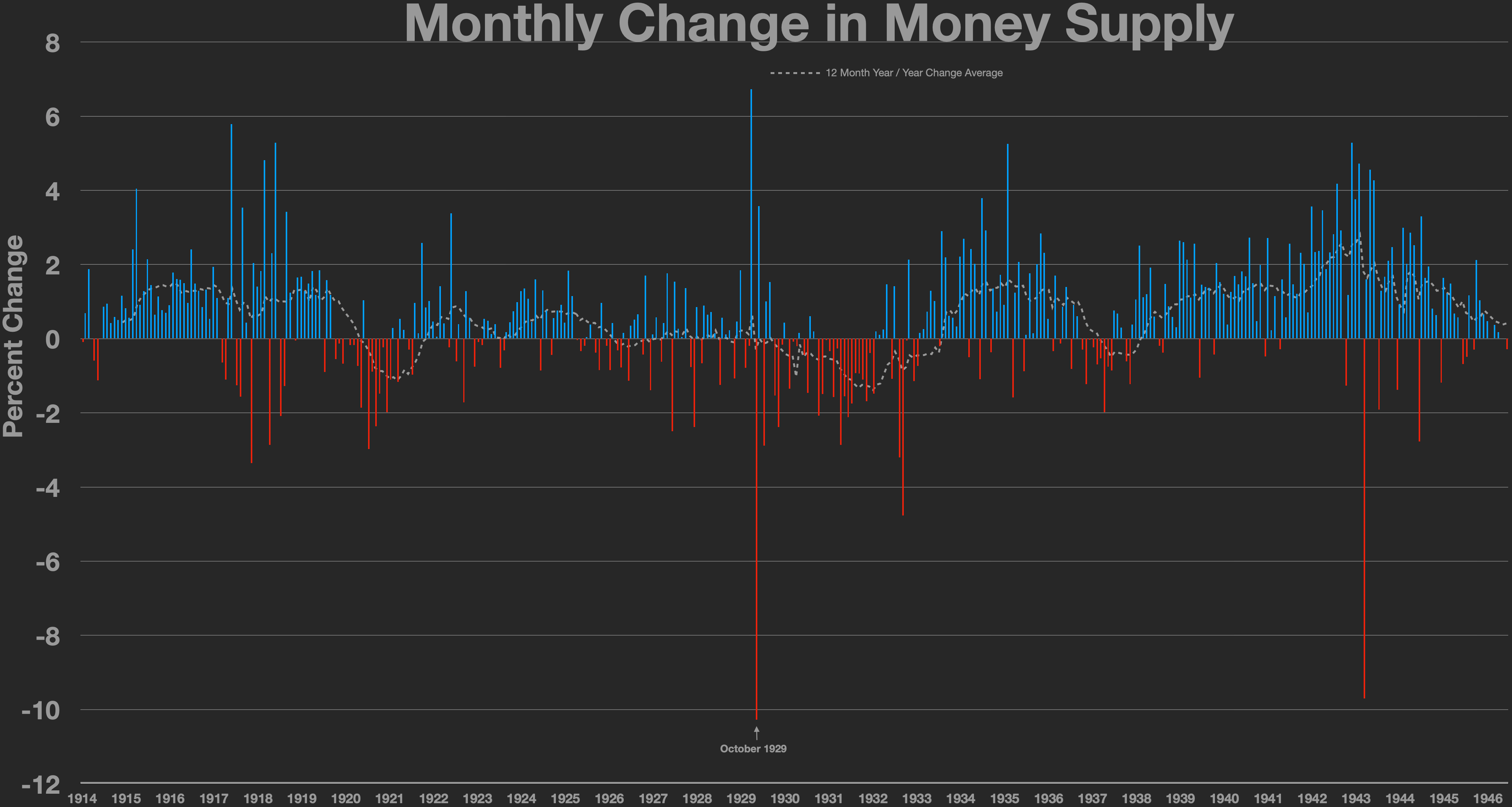
Total money supply contracted -10.28% in October 1929 to try to squeeze out speculation in the Stock market and make sure there was enough gold reserves in exchange for dollars

- List of Federal Reserve chairs

Other offices
Preceded by Theodore Wold	President of the Federal Reserve Bank of Minneapolis; 1919–1927	Succeeded by W. B. Geery
Preceded by William P. G. Harding	President of the Federal Reserve Bank of Boston; 1930–1942	Succeeded by William Paddock
Government offices
Preceded by Daniel Richard Crissinger	Member of the Federal Reserve Board of Governors; 1927–1930	Succeeded by Menc Szymczak
Preceded by Daniel Richard Crissinger	Chairman of the Federal Reserve; 1927–1930	Succeeded by Eugene Meyer
