= Boligee, Alabama =

- Town
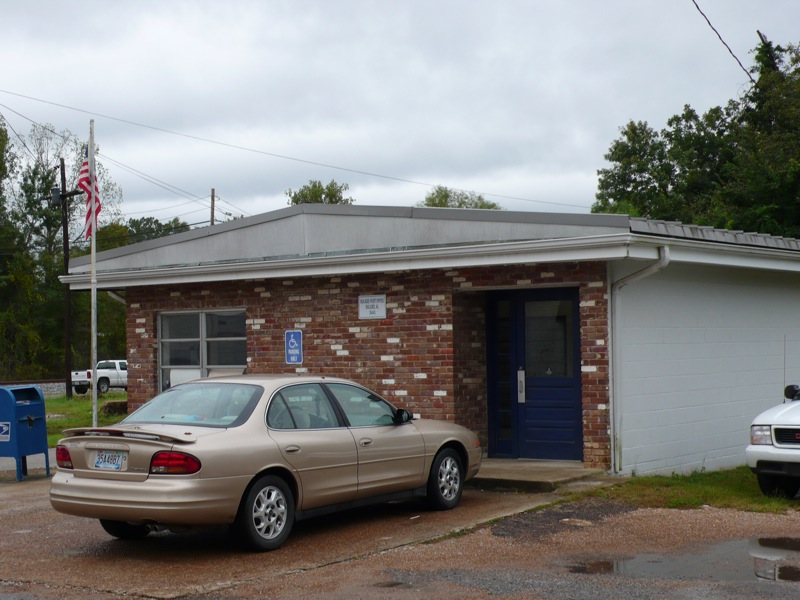
- The U.S. Post Office in Boligee, Alabama, in 2009

- Location of Boligee in Greene County, Alabama.
- Coordinates: 32°45′25″N 88°01′34″W
- Country: United States
- State: Alabama
- County: Greene

Area
  - Total: 3.97 sq mi (10.27 km^{2})
  - Land: 3.95 sq mi (10.23 km^{2})
  - Water: 0.015 sq mi (0.04 km^{2})
- Elevation: 115 ft (35 m)

Population (2020)
  - Total: 301
  - Density: 76.2/sq mi (29.41/km^{2})
- Time zone: UTC-6 (Central (CST))
  - Summer (DST): UTC-5 (CDT)
- ZIP code: 35443
- Area codes: 205, 659
- FIPS code: 01-08104
- GNIS feature ID: 2405297

Boligee /ˈboʊləˌdʒi/ is a town in Greene County, Alabama, United States. Per the 2020 census, the population was 301. Although Boligee appeared on the 1880 U.S. Census, according to the 1930 U.S. Census it did not incorporate until 1926, though another source cited 1927.

Boligee has one site listed on the National Register of Historic Places, Boligee Hill.

== Geography ==
According to the U.S. Census Bureau, the town has a total area of 4.0 square miles (10 km^{2}), all land.

== Demographics ==
Historical population
Census	Pop.	Note	%±
1880	36		—
1930	178		—
1940	241		35.4%
1950	168		−30.3%
1960	134		−20.2%
1970	225		67.9%
1980	164		−27.1%
1990	268		63.4%
2000	369		37.7%
2010	328		−11.1%
2020	301		−8.2%
U.S. Decennial Census; 2010 2020

=== 2020 census ===
Boligee town, Alabama – Racial and ethnic composition Note: the US Census treats Hispanic/Latino as an ethnic category. This table excludes Latinos from the racial categories and assigns them to a separate category. Hispanics/Latinos may be of any race.
Race / Ethnicity (NH = Non-Hispanic)	Pop 2010	Pop 2020	% 2010	% 2020
White alone (NH)	29	26	8.84%	8.64%
Black or African American alone (NH)	295	270	89.94%	89.70%
Native American or Alaska Native alone (NH)	0	0	0.00%	0.00%
Asian alone (NH)	0	0	0.00%	0.00%
Pacific Islander alone (NH)	0	0	0.00%	0.00%
Some Other Race alone (NH)	0	0	0.00%	0.00%
Mixed Race or Multi-Racial (NH)	3	5	0.91%	1.66%
Hispanic or Latino (any race)	1	0	0.30%	0.00%
Total	328	301	100.00%	100.00%

=== 2000 Census ===
As of the census of 2000, there were 369 people, 150 households, and 105 families residing in the town. The population density was 93.3 inhabitants per square mile (36.0/km^{2}). There were 179 housing units at an average density of 45.2 per square mile (17.5/km^{2}). The racial makeup of the town was 10.57% White, 88.89% Black or African American, and 0.54% from two or more races. 1.90% of the population were Hispanic or Latino of any race.

There were 150 households, out of which 44.0% had children under the age of 18 living with them, 26.0% were married couples living together, 41.3% had a female householder with no husband present, and 30.0% were non-families. 27.3% of all households were made up of individuals, and 10.0% had someone living alone who was 65 years of age or older. The average household size was 2.46 and the average family size was 2.99.

In the town, the population was spread out, with 35.2% under the age of 18, 14.6% from 18 to 24, 19.8% from 25 to 44, 18.7% from 45 to 64, and 11.7% who were 65 years of age or older. The median age was 25 years. For every 100 females, there were 69.3 males. For every 100 females age 18 and over, there were 60.4 males.

The median income for a household in the town was $15,000, and the median income for a family was $16,146. Males had a median income of $23,750 versus $21,000 for females. The per capita income for the town was $7,909. About 41.4% of families and 44.9% of the population were below the poverty line, including 63.3% of those under age 18 and 10.3% of those age 65 or over.

== Notable people ==
- Emma Didlake, United States veteran
- William P. G. Harding, American banker and managing director of the War Finance Corporation
- Charles Hays, Confederate major who became a Republican Congressman.
- Brad Hubbert, American football player, played in the 1967 American Football League All-Star game.

== Gallery ==
Below are photographs taken in Boligee as part of the Historic American Buildings Survey:

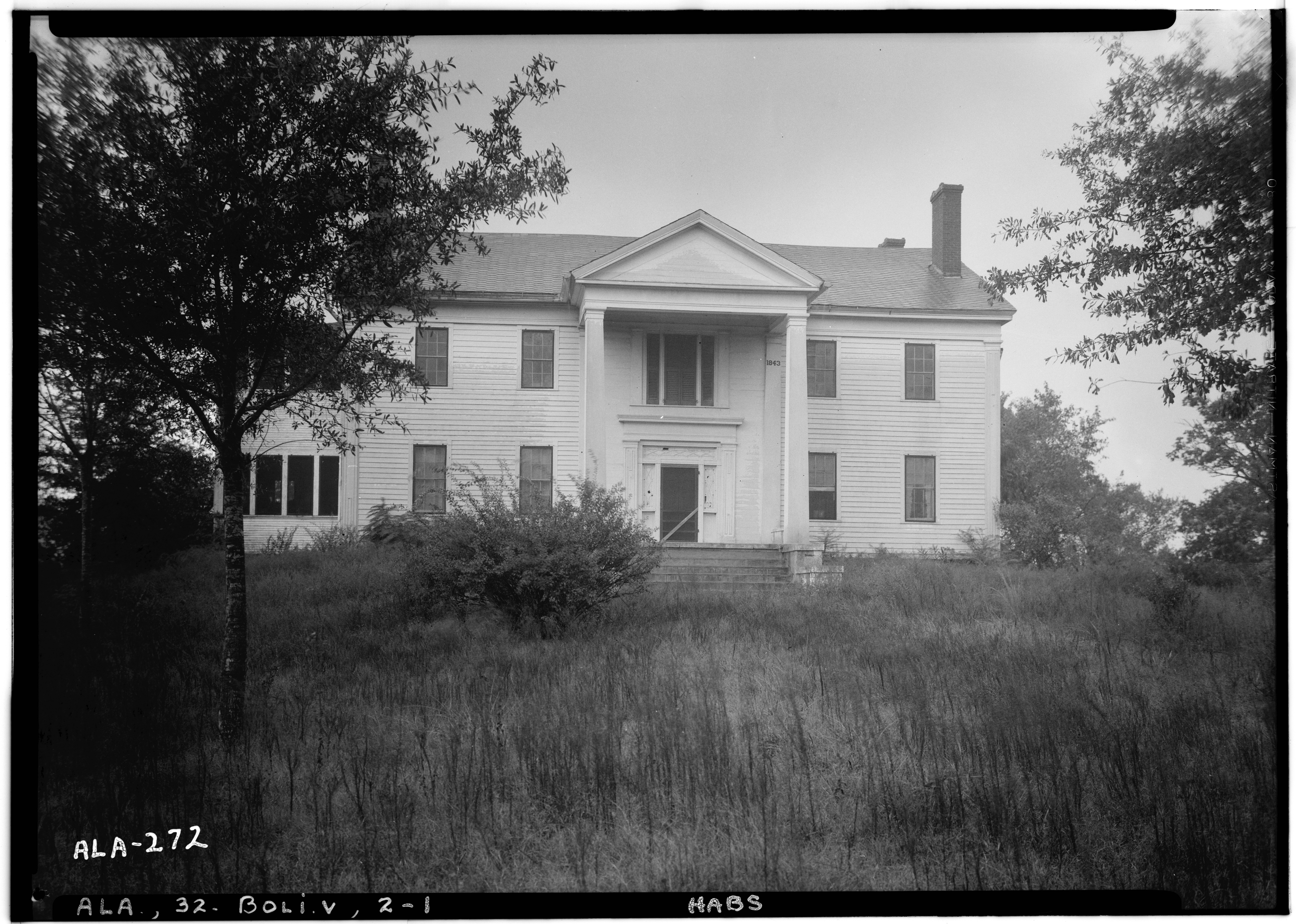
Weston House and Schoolhouse

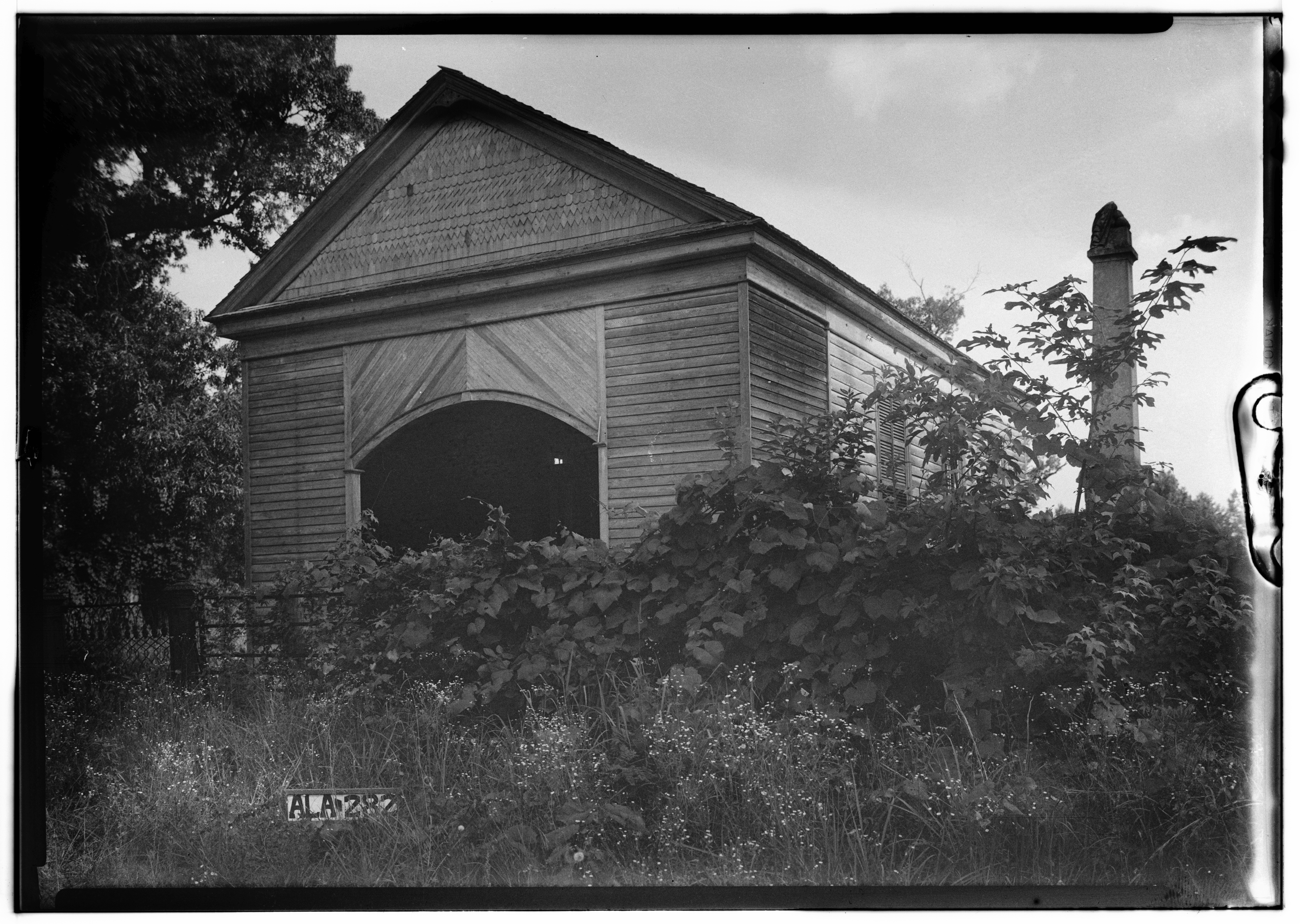
Beth Salem Presbyterian Church

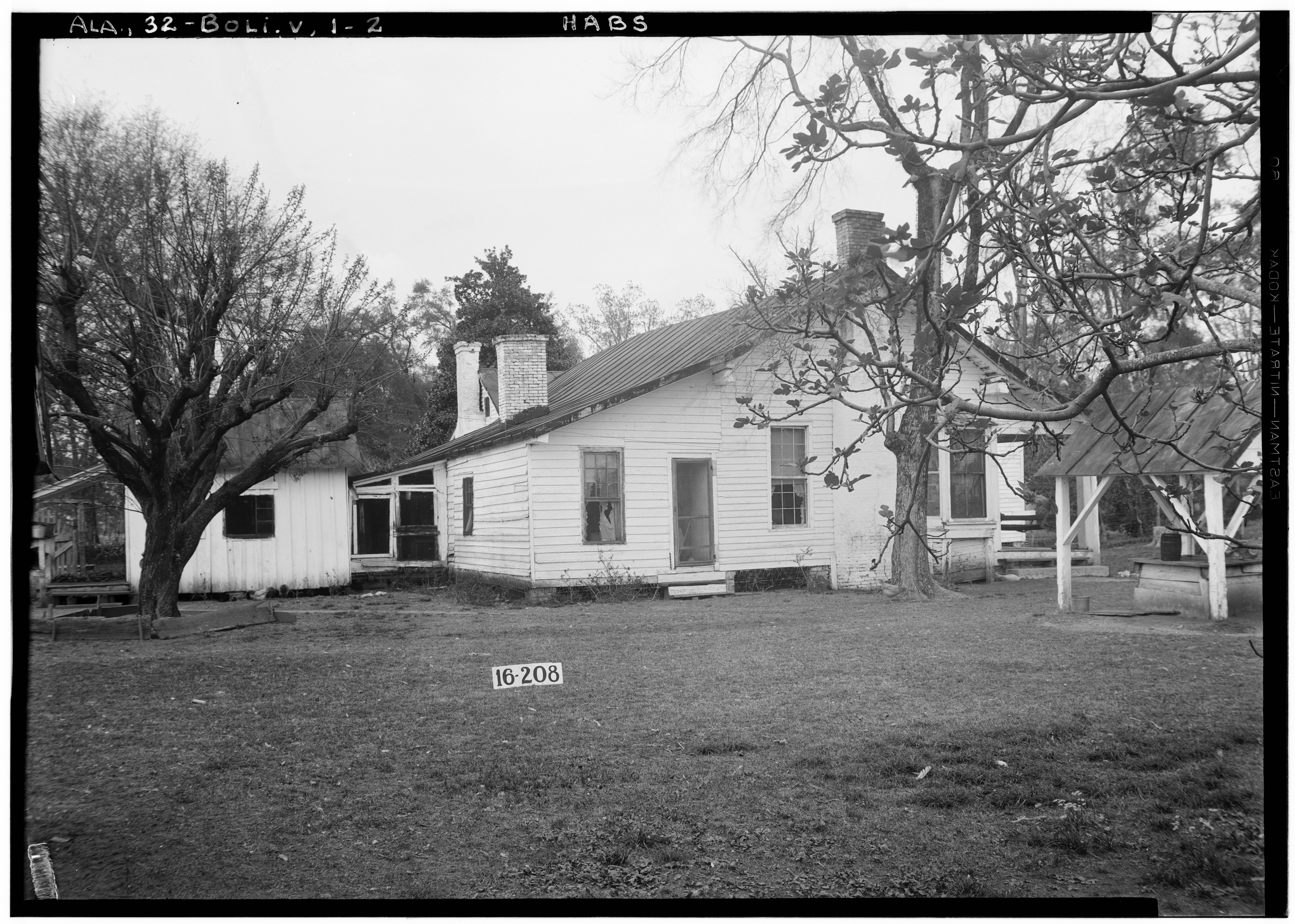
Hill of Howth

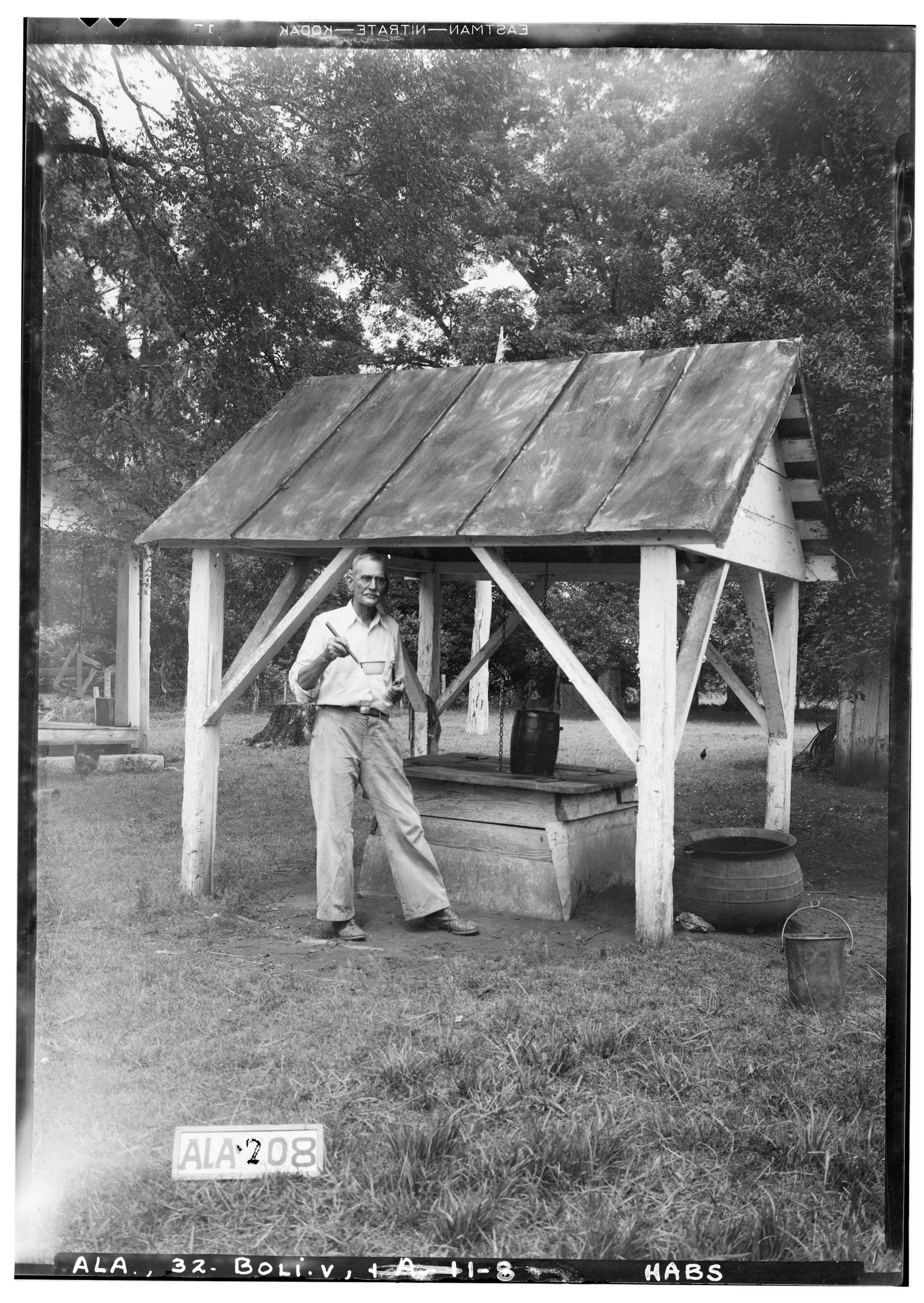
Old well located at Hill of Howth
