= Daniel Richard Crissinger =

American lawyer and banker (1860–1942)

Daniel Crissinger
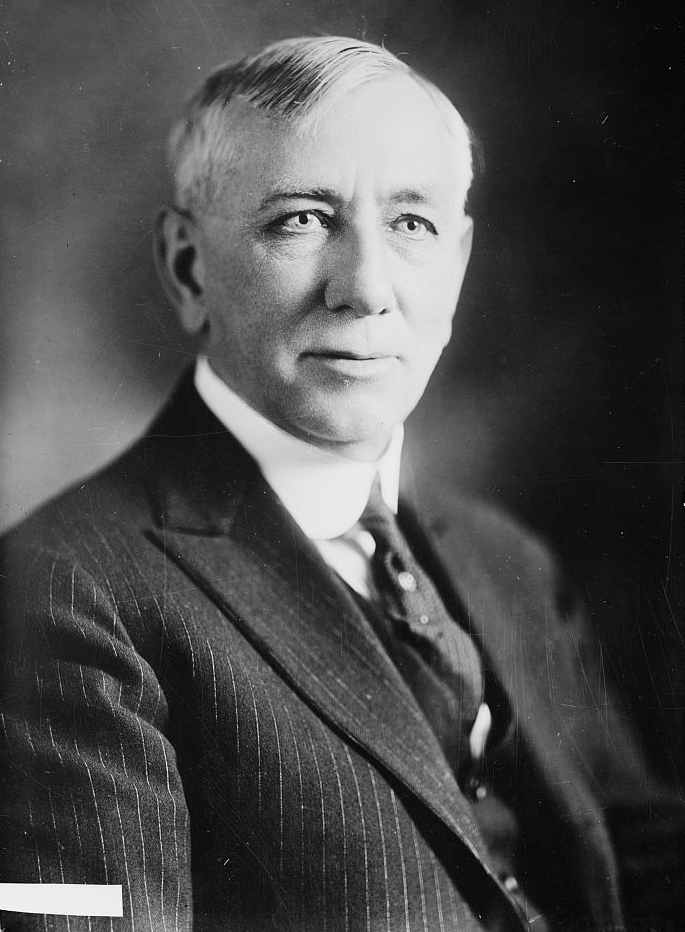

3rd Chairman of the Federal Reserve
- In office May 1, 1923 – September 15, 1927
- President: Warren G. Harding; Calvin Coolidge
- Deputy: Edmund Platt
- Preceded by: William P. G. Harding
- Succeeded by: Roy A. Young

Member of the Federal Reserve Board
- In office May 1, 1923 – September 15, 1927
- President: Warren G. Harding; Calvin Coolidge
- Preceded by: William P. G. Harding
- Succeeded by: Roy A. Young

14th Comptroller of the Currency
- In office March 17, 1921 - March 30, 1923
- President: Warren G. Harding
- Preceded by: John Skelton Williams
- Succeeded by: Henry M. Dawes

Personal details
- Born: December 10, 1860 Tully Township, Marion County, Ohio, U.S.
- Died: July 12, 1942 (aged 81) Marion, Ohio, U.S.
- Party: Democratic
- Education: University of Akron (BS); University of Cincinnati (LLB)

Daniel Richard Crissinger (December 10, 1860 – July 12, 1942) was an American banker and lawyer who served as the 3rd chairman of the Federal Reserve from 1923 to 1927. Crissinger previously served as the 14th comptroller of the Currency from 1921 to 1923.

== Early life ==
Crissinger was born on December 10, 1860, to John M. Crissinger a leading lumberjack tradesman and Margaret (Ganzhorn) Crissinger a German immigrant in Tully Township, Marion County, Ohio. He was named after his grand-uncle Daniel Crissinger and was an only child after his brother died at infancy. Crissinger was educated in Caledonia, Ohio, and graduated from Caledonia High School in 1880. He spent one year as a grade school teacher and he worked for one year in the high school.

He attended Buchtel College in Akron, Ohio, and graduated 1885. He studied law with Judge William Z. Davis in Marion, Ohio, until he began formal study at the University of Cincinnati. After graduation in June 1886, he became a partner of Judge Davis.

== Career ==
In 1893 Crissinger was elected city solicitor of Marion, Ohio. He served in several partnerships and was nominated for Congress in 1904 and 1906 as a Democrat. Crissinger was vice-president of City National Bank of Marion, Ohio at the time of its founding and he became president of the bank in 1911. He held other posts including director of Marion Steam Shovel Company, president of National City Bank & Trust Company, director and vice-president of the Marion Union Stock Yards Company director, a director and treasurer of the Marion Packing Company, a director of the Marion County Telephone Company, and president of the Marion Cemetery Association.

Crissinger was nominated in 1921 by Republican President Warren G. Harding, who was a friend and neighbor in Ohio, to serve as the 14th Comptroller of the Currency. He became the 3rd Chairman of the Federal Reserve in 1923 and he served under presidents Harding and Coolidge.

== Death ==
He died on July 12, 1942.

Political offices
Preceded by John Skelton Williams	Comptroller of the Currency; 1921–1923	Succeeded by Henry M. Dawes
Government offices
Preceded by William P. G. Harding	Member of the Federal Reserve Board of Governors; 1923–1927	Succeeded by Roy A. Young
Preceded by William P. G. Harding	Chairman of the Federal Reserve; 1923–1927	Succeeded by Roy A. Young
