= Eugene Meyer (financier) =

American financier and newspaper publisher (1875–1959)

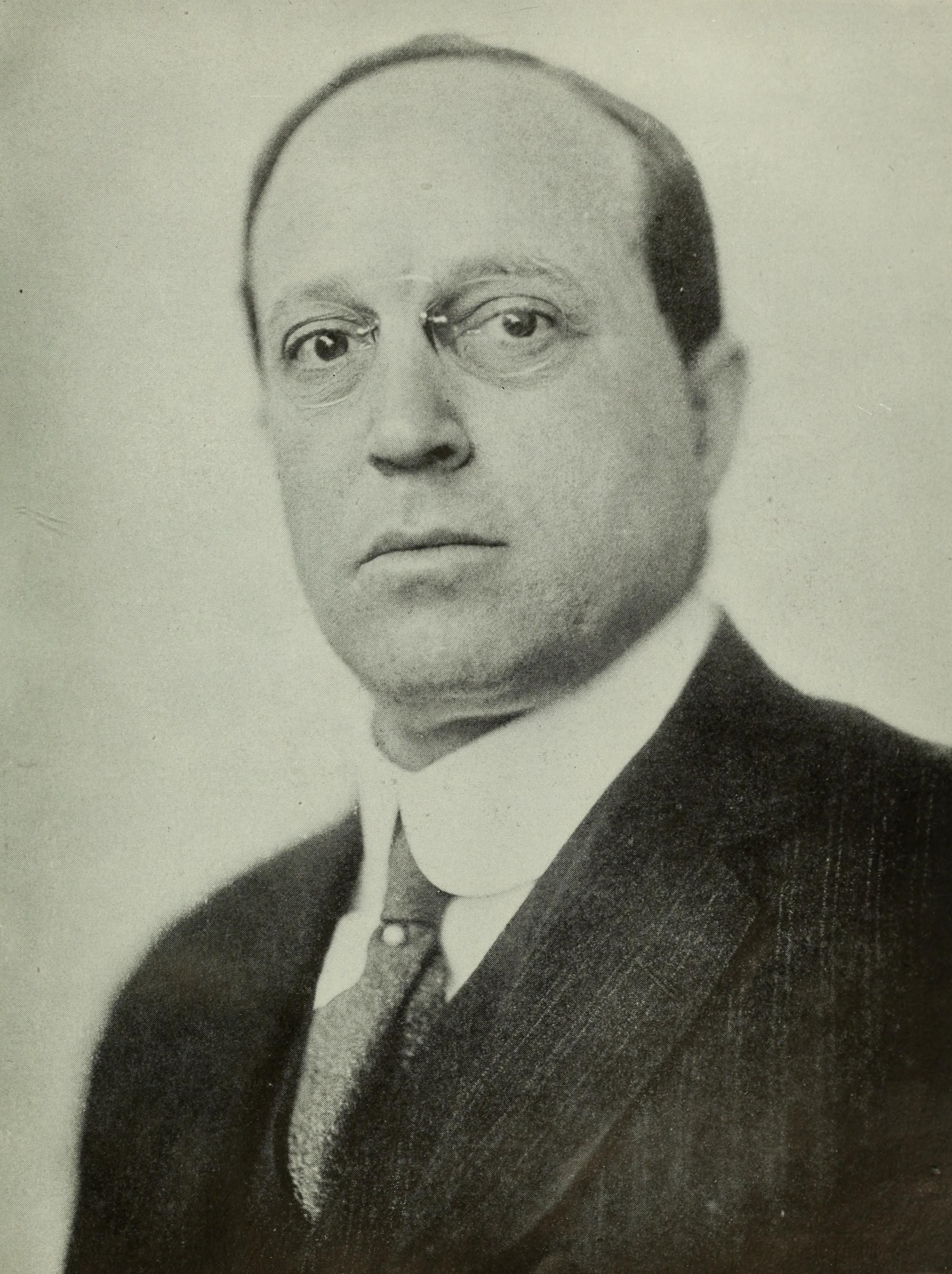

1st President of the World Bank Group
- In office June 18, 1946 – December 18, 1946
- Preceded by: Position established
- Succeeded by: John J. McCloy

5th Chairman of the Federal Reserve
- In office September 16, 1930 – May 10, 1933
- President: Herbert Hoover; Franklin D. Roosevelt
- Preceded by: Roy A. Young
- Succeeded by: Eugene Robert Black

Member of the Federal Reserve Board
- In office September 16, 1930 – May 10, 1933
- President: Herbert Hoover; Franklin D. Roosevelt
- Preceded by: Edmund Platt
- Succeeded by: Eugene Robert Black

Personal details
- Born: Eugene Isaac Meyer; October 31, 1875 Los Angeles, California, U.S.
- Died: July 17, 1959 (aged 83) Washington, D.C., U.S.
- Party: Republican
- Spouse: Agnes Ernst (m. 1910)
- Children: 5, including Florence and Katharine
- Parent: Marc Eugene Meyer (father)
- Relatives: Florence Meyer Blumenthal (sister); Aline Meyer Liebman (sister); Joseph Newmark (grandfather)
- Education: Yale University (BA)

Eugene Isaac Meyer (October 31, 1875 – July 17, 1959) was an American banker, businessman, financier, and newspaper publisher. He was the fifth chairman of the Federal Reserve from 1930 to 1933. Meyer purchased The Washington Post in 1933, and was its publisher from 1933 to 1946, with the paper staying in his family throughout the rest of the 20th century. He was the first president of the World Bank Group from June to December 1946.

His daughter, Katharine Graham, was the titular head of The Washington Post from 1963 until her death in 2001.

== Early life and education ==
Meyer was born in 1875 to a Jewish family in Los Angeles, California, descended from a long line of rabbis and civic leaders. He was one of eight children of Harriet (née Newmark) and Marc Eugene Meyer. His mother was the daughter of Joseph Newmark, an early Jewish activist and rabbi in Los Angeles. He grew up in San Francisco. He attended the University of California, Berkeley, but dropped out after one year. He later enrolled at Yale University, where he earned a bachelor's degree in 1895, and a Doctorate of Law.

== Career ==
=== Banking and finance ===
After college, Meyer went to work for Lazard Frères, where his father was a partner, but quit in 1901 after four years and went out on his own. He was a successful investor and speculator, and owned a seat on the New York Stock Exchange. By 1915, when he was forty, he was worth $40 million.

In April 1918, exactly a year after the US entry into World War 1, he was made the director of the US government's War Finance Corporation.

In 1920, Meyer teamed with William H. Nichols of General Chemical to help fulfill his vision of a bigger, better chemical company. Meyer and Nichols combined five smaller chemical companies to create the Allied Chemical & Dye Corporation, which later became Allied Chemical Corp., which in turn became part of AlliedSignal, the forerunner of Honeywell’s specialty materials business. Both men have buildings named after them at Honeywell's Morris Plains, New Jersey, headquarters.

==== Chairman of the Federal Reserve ====
Meyer went to Washington, D.C., during World War I as a dollar-a-year man for Woodrow Wilson, becoming the head of the War Finance Corporation and serving there long after the end of hostilities. President Calvin Coolidge named him as chairman of the Federal Farm Loan Board in 1927.

Herbert Hoover promoted him to Chairman of the Federal Reserve Board in 1930. He took on an additional half-year post in 1932 as chief of the new Reconstruction Finance Corporation, which was Hoover's unsuccessful attempt to aid companies by providing loans to businesses. After Franklin D. Roosevelt became president, Meyer resigned his Fed position on May 10, 1933.

Meyer has been criticized as Fed Chairman for not attacking the economic catastrophe of the early 1930s with monetary stimulus, thus allowing the banking crisis to get out of hand and deepening the economic collapse. One of his biggest critics at the time condemned Meyer along with J. P. Morgan, Andrew Mellon and Ogden Mills as being the Four Horsemen of the Apocalypse. Subsequent critics include Nobel laureate Milton Friedman and his fellow economist Anna Schwartz who, in their landmark book A Monetary History of the United States, put forth the argument that the Fed could have lessened the severity of the Depression, but failed to exercise its role of managing the monetary system and ameliorating banking panics.

=== Publishing ===
==== The Washington Post ====
In 1929, Meyer made an offer of $5 million for The Washington Post, but he was rebuffed. In June 1933, he bought the paper at a bankruptcy auction for $825,000, the paper having been ruined by its spendthrift socialite owner Ned McLean, and by the Great Depression. Meyer had resigned as Fed chairman just three weeks earlier, and he had no experience in the publishing business. But he was prepared to bid up to $2 million for the Post, far more than the other bidders, including William Randolph Hearst. Preferring to remain anonymous, Meyer stayed home from the proceedings.

After weeks of speculation when even his daughter Katharine did not know the buyer's name, it was finally revealed in newspapers around the country on June 13.

In his statement to the press, Meyer vowed to improve the Post, and asserted that he would operate it independently. He also said that he had bought the Post on his own, without the influence of "any person, group or organization." He made this statement to contradict the rumors that as a well-known Republican, he would soon turn it into a voice for Republican causes. Press reaction to the purchase was positive, with other newspapers being pleased that the Post would not go out of business, and would continue to report the news from the nation's capital; given its important location, said one editorial, rescuing the Post was "a public service."

An editorial in a newspaper that was identifiably Republican praised the purchase as "good news for journalism." While expressing the hope that Meyer would in fact take the Republican point of view, the editorial acknowledged that he probably would not do so, since he seemed to be "no slavish supporter of any party or leader," assuring that under his leadership the Washington Post would be "hard hitting and independent, a paper that nobody can ignore." As it turned out, Meyer did take the side of the Republican party on some issues. He was opposed to FDR's New Deal, and this was reflected in the Post's editorial stance as well as its news coverage, especially regarding the National Recovery Administration (NRA). He even wrote an editorializing "news" story under a fake name.

Over the next twenty years, Meyer spent millions of dollars of his own money to keep the money-losing paper in business, while focusing on improving its quality; by the 1950s, it was finally consistently profitable and was increasingly recognized for good reporting and important editorials. As publisher, Meyer occasionally contributed to stories: his friendship with the British Ambassador, Lord Lothian, led to a Washington Post scoop on reporting of Edward VIII's relationship with Wallis Simpson.

=== World Bank ===
Following World War II in June 1946, U.S. president Harry S. Truman named Meyer, then 70 years old, the first head of the World Bank. Meyer appointed his son-in-law, Phil Graham, as publisher of the Post. After six months with the World Bank, Meyer returned to the Post, serving as chairman of the Washington Post Company until his death in Washington, D.C., in 1959.

== Personal life ==
Meyer married Agnes Elizabeth Ernst, a Lutheran, in 1910; they had five children, including the future Katharine Graham, and another daughter, Florence Meyer (Mrs. Oskar Homolka). Meyer's older sister, Florence Meyer Blumenthal, was noted for the philanthropic organization she formed, the Franco-American Florence Blumenthal Foundation, which awarded the Prix Blumenthal. His brother, Edgar J. Meyer, married to Leila Saks Meyer, the daughter of Andrew Saks, perished in the sinking of the RMS Titanic.

Meyer died at age 83 on July 17, 1959, at George Washington University Hospital in Washington, D.C., where he had been under treatment for a heart ailment and cancer.

== Legacy ==
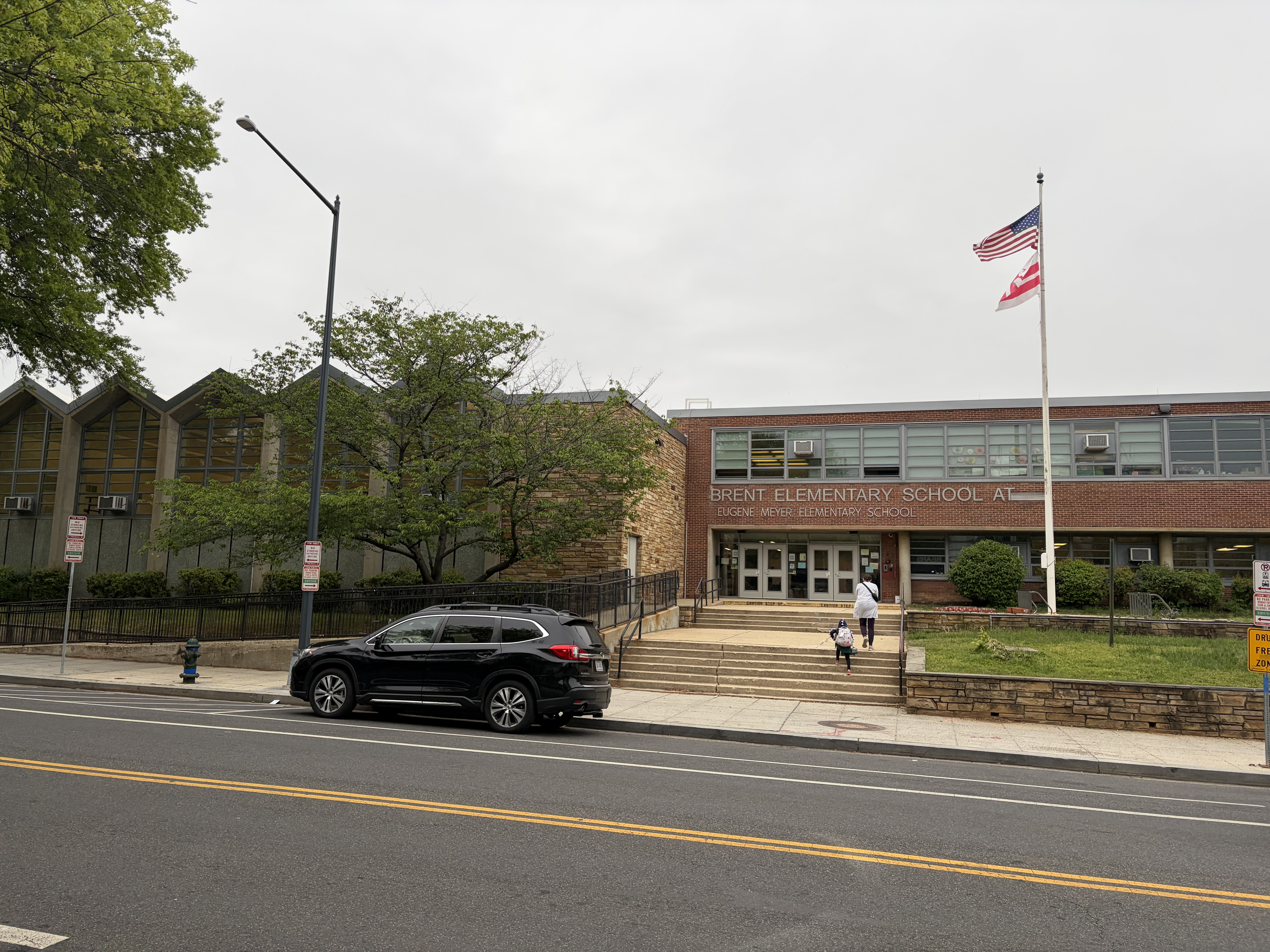
The former Meyer Elementary School in Washington, D.C., which functions as a swing space for District of Columbia Public Schools being renovated

Eugene Meyer Elementary School in Washington, D.C., was named in Meyer's honor in 1963. The school closed in 2008, and the building has since been used as swing space by District of Columbia Public Schools.

== Bibliography ==
- Brasch, Walter M. (1987). Eugene Meyer: His Life and Times by Walter M. Brasch. Greenwood Press.
- Butkiewicz, James (2015). "Eugene Meyer and the German Influence on the Origin of US Federal Financial Rescues" (pdf). Journal of the History of Economic Thought. 37 (1): 57–77.
- Friedman, Milton; Schwartz, Anna J. (1993) [1963]. A Monetary History of the United States, 1867–1960. Chicago: University of Chicago Press. pp. 327–389. ISBN 978-0691003542.
- Graham, Katharine (1997). Personal History. Alfred A. Knopf. ISBN 0394585852.
- Meltzer, Allan H. (2003). A History of the Federal Reserve – Volume 1: 1913–1951. Chicago: University of Chicago Press. pp. 320–436. ISBN 978-0226520001.
- Meyer, Agnes E. (1959). Out of These Roots: The Autobiography of an American Woman. Little, Brown and Company.
- Pusey, Merlo J (1974). Eugene Meyer. Alfred A. Knopf. ISBN 0394478975.

Government offices
Preceded by Edmund Platt	Member of the Federal Reserve Board of Governors; 1930–1933	Succeeded by Eugene Robert Black
Preceded by Roy A. Young	Chairman of the Federal Reserve; 1930–1933	Succeeded by Eugene Robert Black
Diplomatic posts
New office	President of the World Bank Group; 1946	Succeeded by John McCloy
