= Charles Sumner Hamlin =

American lawyer and politician (1861–1938)

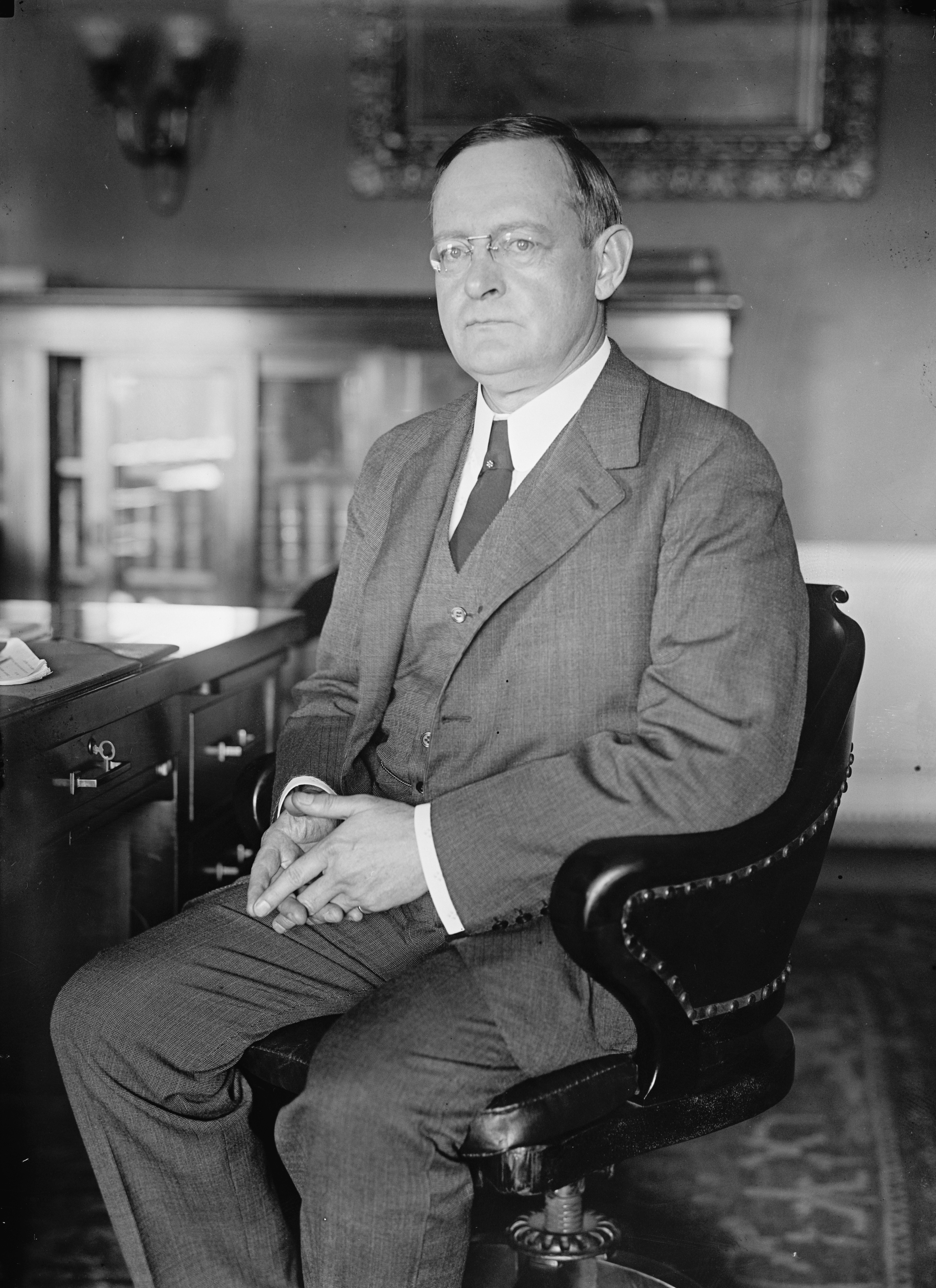

1st Chairman of the Federal Reserve
- In office August 10, 1914 – August 9, 1916
- President: Woodrow Wilson
- Deputy: Frederic Adrian Delano
- Preceded by: Position established
- Succeeded by: William P. G. Harding

Member of the Federal Reserve Board
- In office August 10, 1914 – February 3, 1936
- President: Woodrow Wilson; Warren G. Harding; Calvin Coolidge; Herbert Hoover; Franklin D. Roosevelt
- Preceded by: Position established
- Succeeded by: Ralph Morrison

Personal details
- Born: August 30, 1861 Boston, Massachusetts, U.S.
- Died: April 24, 1938 (aged 76) Washington, D.C., U.S.
- Party: Democratic
- Spouse: Huybertje Pruyn (m. 1898)
- Education: Harvard University (BA, MA)

Charles Sumner Hamlin (August 30, 1861 – April 24, 1938) was an American lawyer and politician who served as the first chairman of the Federal Reserve from 1914 to 1916. He previously served as the United States assistant secretary of the treasury from 1893 to 1897, and again from 1913 until 1914 when President Woodrow Wilson nominated him as one of the original members of the Federal Reserve Board. After his term as chairman, Hamlin continued to serve on the Board through 1936.

== Early life ==
Charles Sumner Hamlin was born in Boston, Massachusetts, on August 30, 1861, to Anna and Edward Hamlin. His mother was born in England to Irish parents, while his father, a coal dealer, was from Massachusetts. He graduated from Harvard University with a Bachelor of Arts degree in 1883 and received his Master of Arts from Harvard in 1886. Sumner studied law while completing his master's degree and attained admission to the bar in 1886, practicing law in Boston.

== Career ==
From 1893 to 1897 and again from 1913 to 1914, Hamlin was the Assistant Secretary of the Treasury. He twice ran unsuccessfully for Governor of Massachusetts, in 1902 and 1910. On August 10, 1914, he was appointed the first Chairman of the Federal Reserve and served in that capacity until August 9, 1916. Hamlin remained as Fed's board member until 1936. He lectured at Harvard University on government studies from 1902 to 1903.

In 1912, Hamlin was vice president of the Woodrow Wilson College Men's League and president of the Woodrow Wilson League of Massachusetts. He also published pamphlets on statistical and financial subjects, including an Index Digest of Interstate Commerce Laws (1907) and the Index Digest of the Federal Reserve Bulletin (1921).

== Death ==
Hamlin died in Washington, D.C., on April 24, 1938. He was buried at Forest Hills Cemetery in Jamaica Plain, Massachusetts.

== Family ==
In 1898, Sumner married Huybertje Lansing Pruyn (April 8, 1878 – March 6, 1964), the daughter of John V. L. Pruyn and granddaughter of Amasa J. Parker.

== Legacy ==
Hamlin's papers are archived at the Library of Congress.

Government offices
New office	Member of the Federal Reserve Board of Governors; 1914–1936	Succeeded by Ralph Morrison
New office	Chairman of the Federal Reserve; 1914–1916	Succeeded by William P. G. Harding
