= Boligee Hill =

Historic house in Alabama, United States

- U.S. National Register of Historic Places
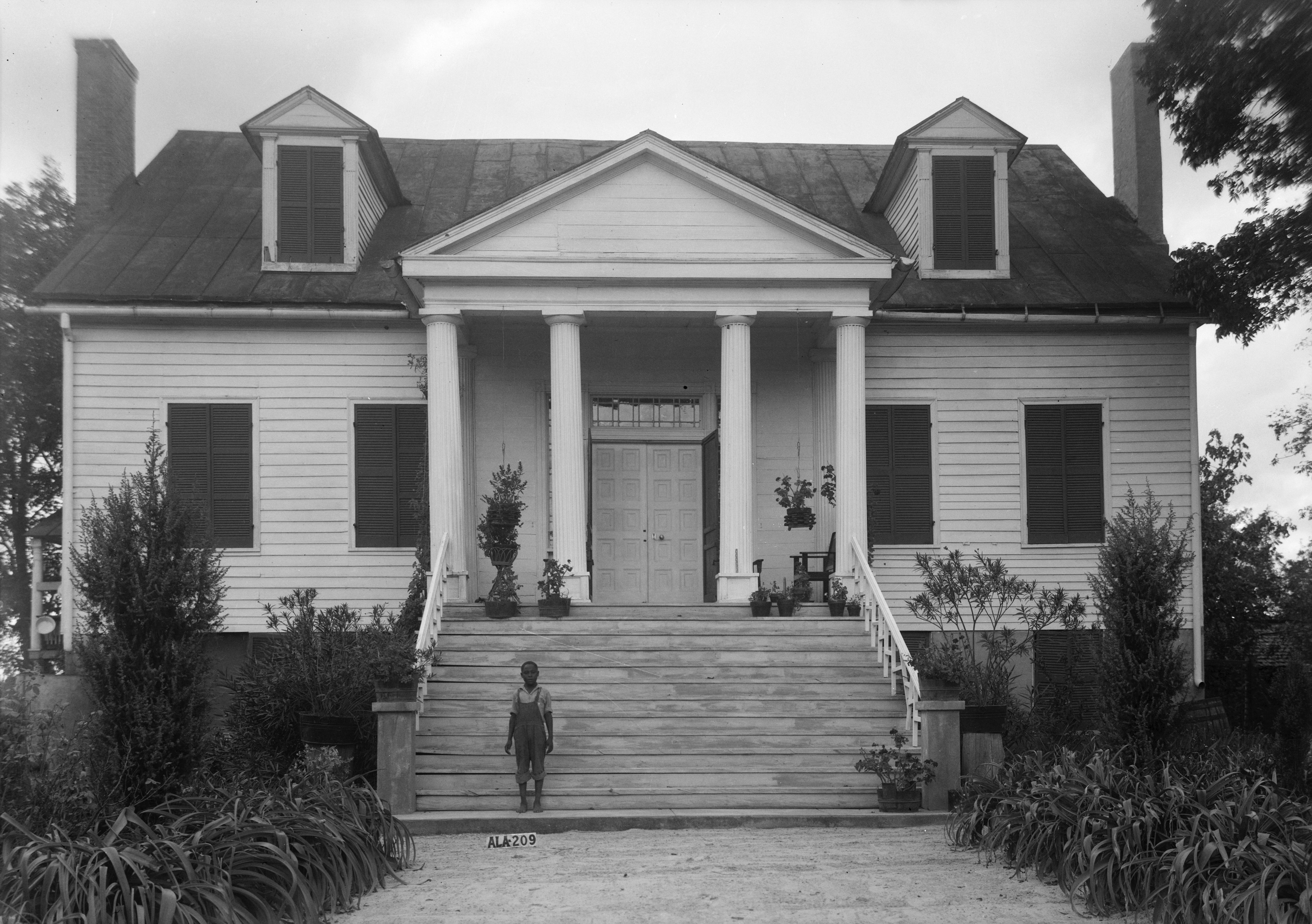
- The house in 1936

- Location within Alabama Location within the United States
- Nearest city: Boligee, Alabama
- Coordinates: 32°45′35″N 87°59′20″W
- Built: 1840
- NRHP reference No.: 82002014
- Added to NRHP: February 19, 1982

Boligee Hill, now known as Myrtle Hill, is a historic plantation house near Boligee, Alabama, United States. The Boligee Hill plantation was established in 1835 by a physician, John David Means. He had migrated to Alabama from Newberry, South Carolina. Means had 110 slaves according to the 1850 Greene County census. The house was built in 1840. It was acquired by the Hays family in 1869 and renamed Myrtle Hall for the sweet myrtle growing around it. The property was restored in 2007 by the Beeker family and renamed Myrtle Hill. The house was placed on the National Register of Historic Places on February 19, 1982, due to its architectural significance.

== Gallery ==
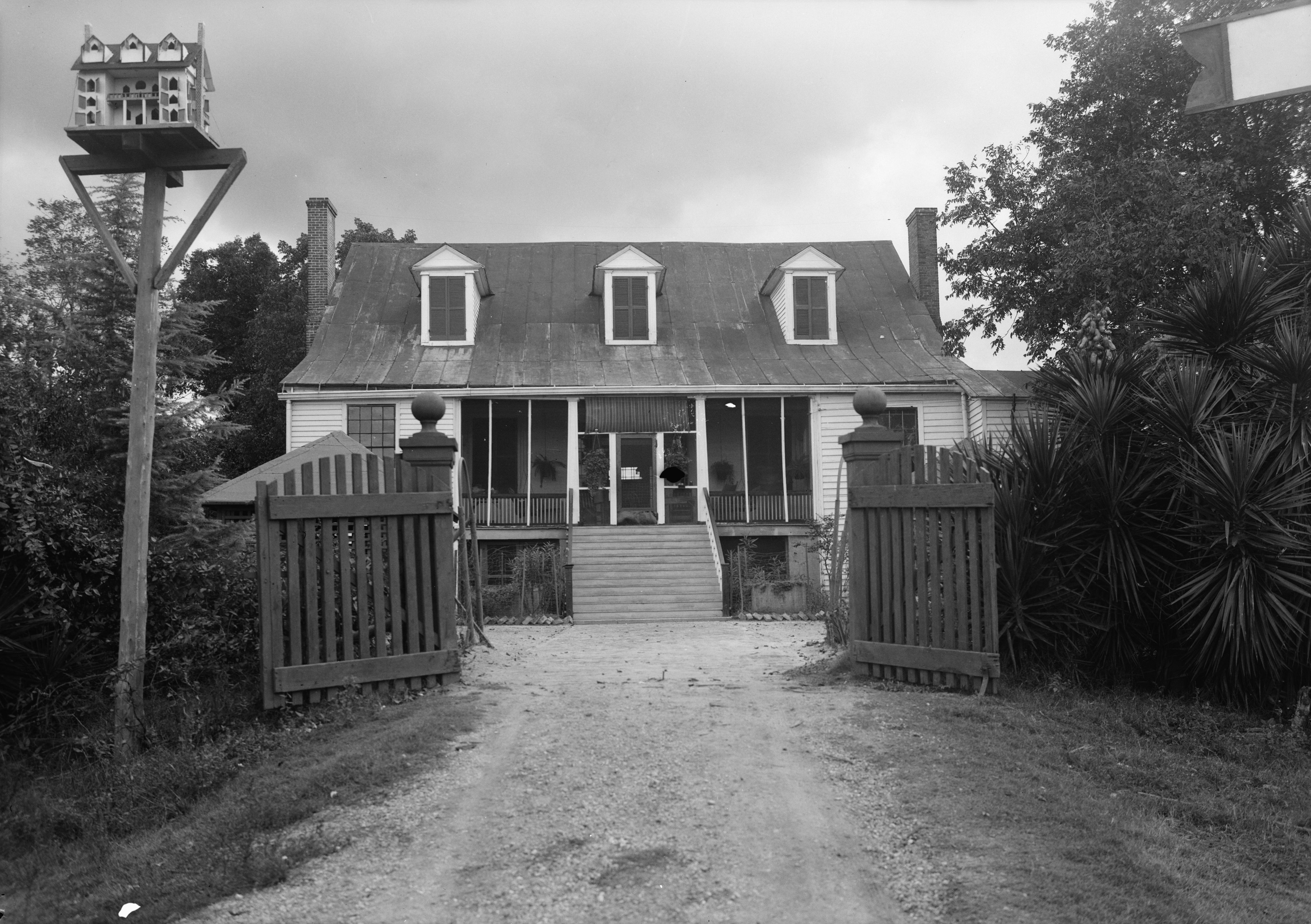
Rear elevation in 1936

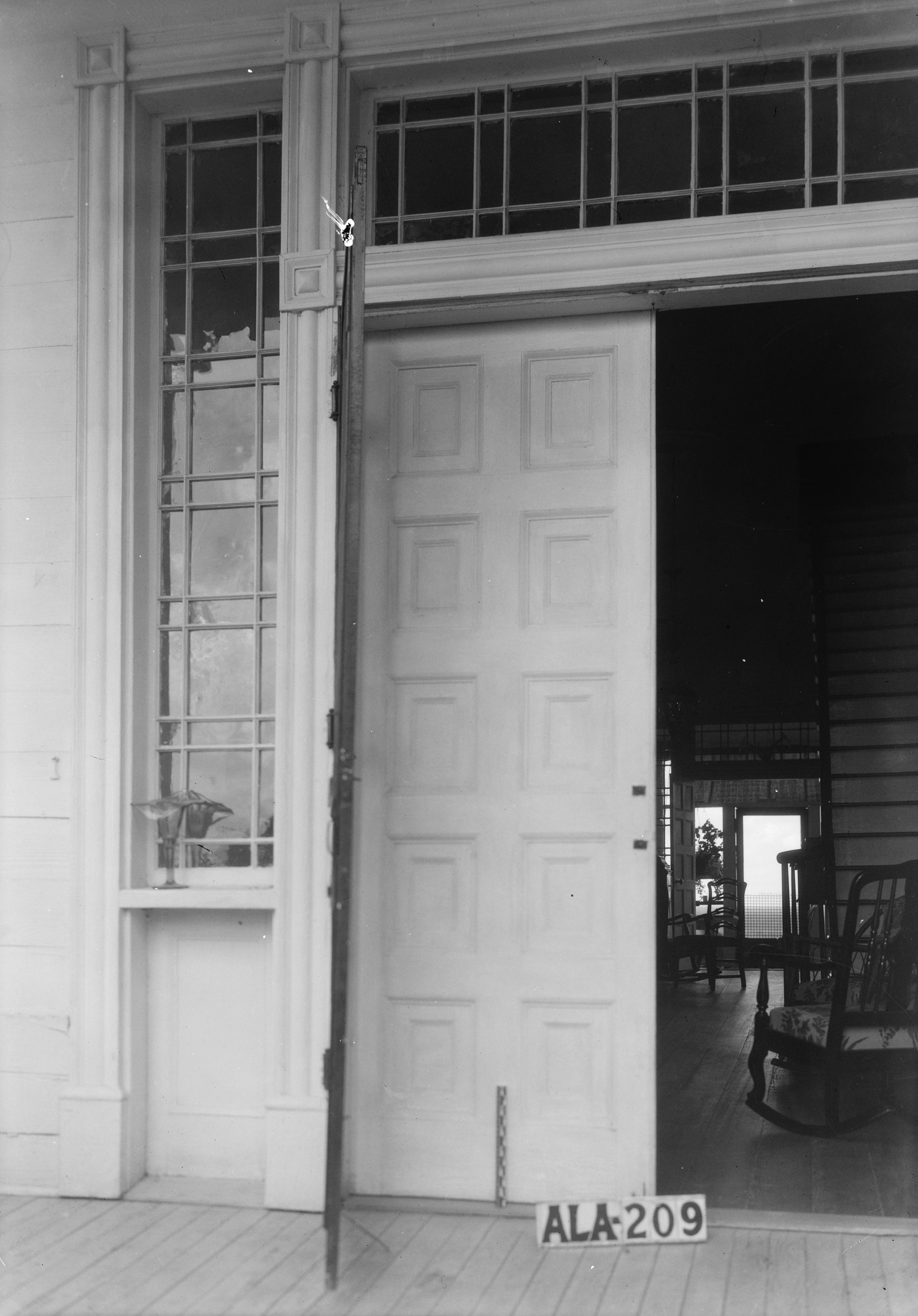
Detail of front entrance

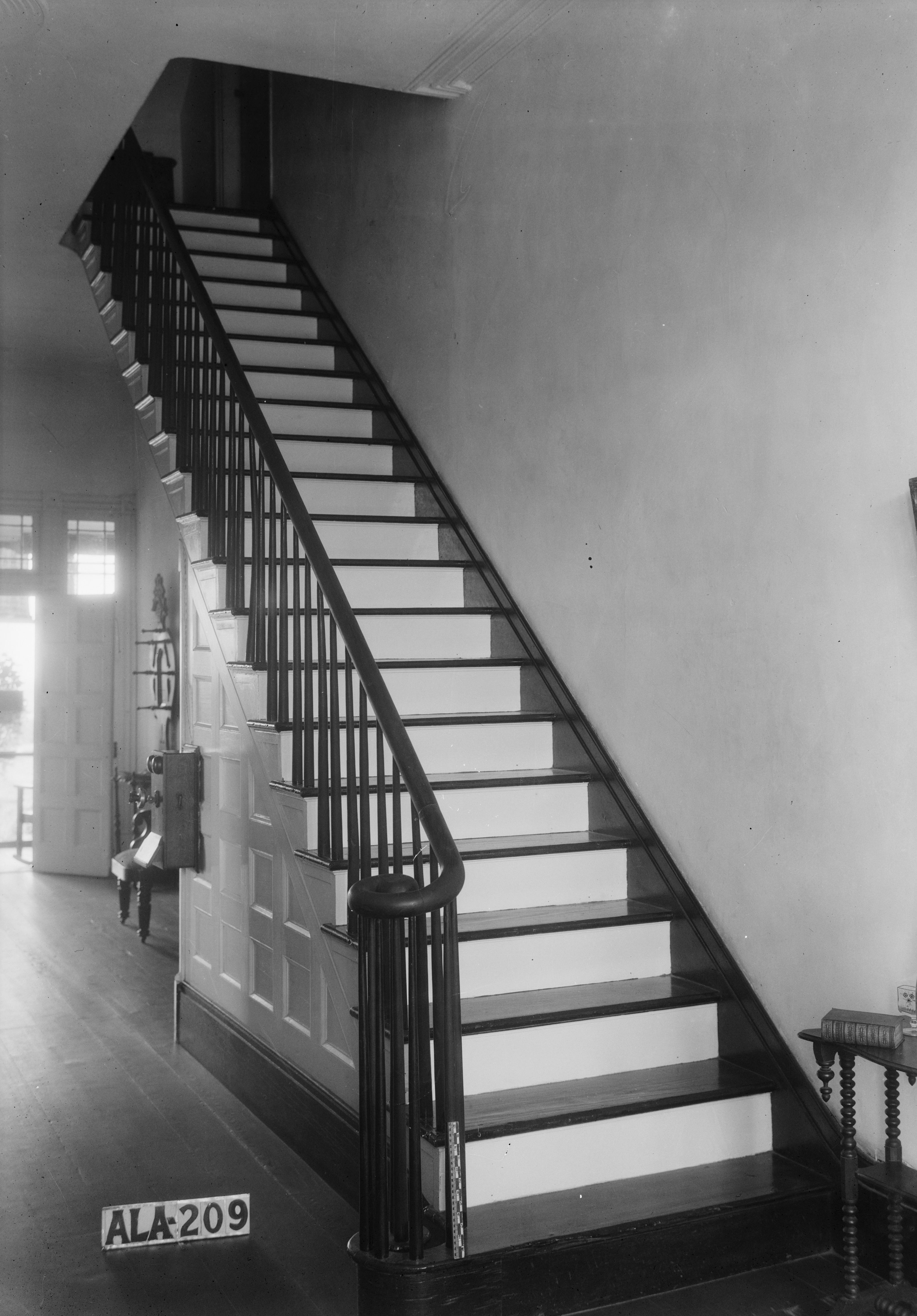
Detail of staircase in entrance hall
