= Emma Didlake =

American supercentenarian and military personnel (1904–2015)

- Born: March 13, 1904; Boligee, Alabama, U.S.
- Died: August 16, 2015 (aged 111 years, 156 days); West Bloomfield Township, Michigan, U.S.
- Military career
- Allegiance: United States of America
- Branch: United States Army
- Rank: Private
- Unit: Women’s Army Auxiliary Corps
- Awards: American Campaign Medal; Women's Army Corps Service Medal; World War II Victory Medal

Emma Didlake (March 13, 1904 – August 16, 2015) was an African-American supercentenarian. She served in the Women's Army Auxiliary Corps.

== Early life and education ==
Didlake was born in Boligee, Alabama, in 1904.

At a young age, Didlake and her family moved to Kentucky, where she married a coal miner in 1922 and later stayed to raise her own family.

== Career ==
In 1943, when she was 38 years old and the mother of five children, Didlake enlisted in the WAAC. She told the San Antonio Express-News that she joined the Army because she "wanted to do different things." She served stateside as a private and a driver.

For her service in World War II, Didlake earned the Women's Army Corps Service Medal, American Campaign Medal, and World War II Victory Medal.

== After service ==
After leaving the service, Didlake and her family moved to Detroit, Michigan, where she lived until her death. Soon after moving to Detroit, Didlake joined the local NAACP chapter. In 1963, she marched alongside Martin Luther King Jr. at the March on Washington for Jobs and Freedom.

In 2013, Didlake was awarded the James Weldon Johnson lifetime achievement award at Detroit NAACP's 58th annual Freedom Fund Dinner.

On July 17, 2015, at 111 years old, Didlake visited Washington, D.C., on an honorary trip that included meeting President Barack Obama and touring several historic monuments, including the Women in Military Service for America Memorial at Arlington National Cemetery, where she received mementos from retired Brigadier General Wilma Vaught. The trip was organized and funded by Talons Out Honor Flight, a division of the Honor Flight Network.

At their meeting in the Oval Office, Didlake sat in her wheelchair in the same spot where foreign leaders sit when they meet the president in the White House. President Obama praised Didlake for her "trailblazing" service as one of the female and African American veterans who helped to integrate the U.S. Army.

Didlake attributed her longevity to a diet with a great deal of fruits and vegetables. Each day, she would also eat golden raisins that she had soaked in vodka overnight.

== Death and legacy ==
About a month after visiting the White House, Didlake fell ill. She died on August 16, 2015, at 111 years old. She is survived by her grandchildren and great-grandchildren.

On August 19, President Obama issued the following statement to honor Didlake's death:

Emma Didlake served her country with distinction and honor, a true trailblazer for generations of Americans who have sacrificed so much for their country. I was humbled and grateful to welcome Emma to the White House last month, and Michelle and I send our deepest condolences to Emma's family, friends, and everyone she inspired over her long and quintessentially American life.

With Didlake's death, the oldest known veteran (World War II) became Frank Levingston.

== Awards and decorations ==

Women's Army Corps Service Medal	American Campaign Medal	World War II Victory Medal
