= Frank Levingston =

American soldier and supercentenarian (1905–2016)

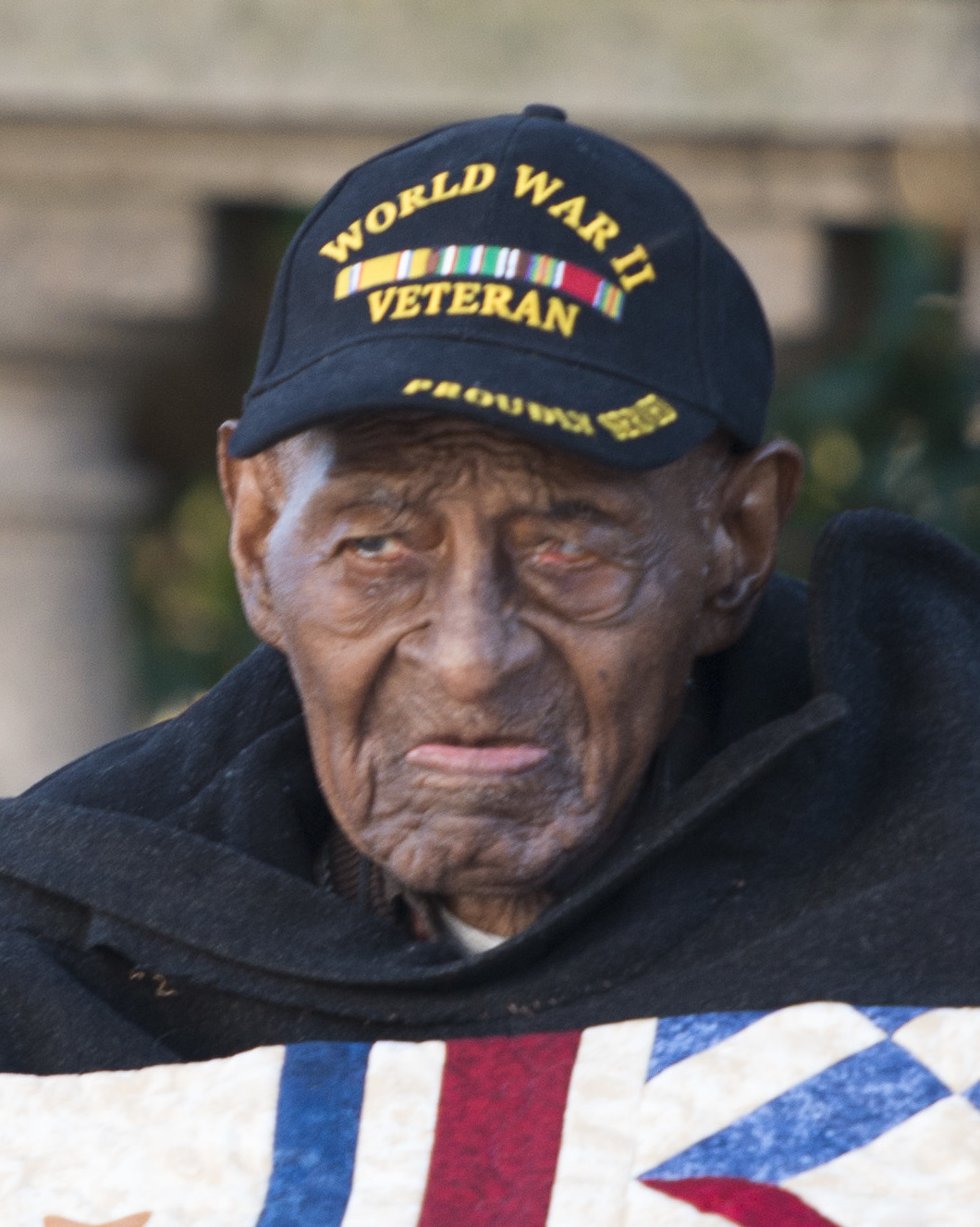
- Levingston at the Tomb of the Unknown Soldier at Arlington National Cemetery, 2015
- Born: Frank Levingston Jr. November 13, 1905; Cotton Valley, Louisiana, U.S.
- Died: May 3, 2016 (aged 110 years, 172 days) Shreveport, Louisiana, U.S.
- Allegiance: United States of America
- Branch: United States Army
- Service years: 1942–1945
- Rank: Private
- Conflicts: World War II; Allied invasion of Italy; North African campaign

Frank Levingston Jr. (November 13, 1905 – May 3, 2016) was an American soldier and supercentenarian. At the time of his death, he was the second-oldest verified military veteran in the United States, the oldest living man in the United States, and the oldest verified American veteran of World War II.

== Biography ==
Levingston was born on November 13, 1905, in Cotton Valley, Louisiana, to Frank and Ida Levingston, and was raised a Methodist. He was the fourth of seven children. As a child, he helped operate his family's 200-acre farm. He received little formal education and his parents died when he was young. Levingston enlisted in the United States Army on October 6, 1942. A private, he served as a truck technician in the Allied invasion of Italy and the North African campaign. After receiving an honorable discharge in 1945, he became a cement finisher for a labor union in San Diego.

In the 1950s, Levingston converted to Islam, though still held ties to Methodism and visited both churches and mosques.

In 2015, on his 110th birthday, Levingston received a congratulatory letter from the White House. On December 7, 2015 – the 74th anniversary of the attack on Pearl Harbor – he and other veterans visited Washington, D.C. with the Honor Flight non-profit, with him laying a wreath on the World War II Memorial.

On August 16, 2015, Levingston became the oldest recognized living military veteran in the United States, following the death of Emma Didlake. He called himself "one of the blessed ones" to be the oldest. By then, according to his nephew, he was healthy and required no medication. He became the oldest living American man on April 19, 2016, following the death of fellow Louisiana resident Felix Simoneaux Jr. (born May 24, 1905).

Levingston never married and has no children, though he helped his extended family. He retired c. 1981 and lived alone, in his home in Lake Charles, Louisiana, until about April 2016, when his family moved him into a nursing home. He died on May 3, 2016, aged 110, in a hospital in Shreveport. His funeral was held in Cotton Grove. His death was consoled in a session of the Louisiana House of Representatives.
