= Chair of the Federal Reserve =

Head of the United States Federal Reserve System

Chair of the Board of Governors of the Federal Reserve System
- Seal of the Board of Governors

- Flag of the Federal Reserve System

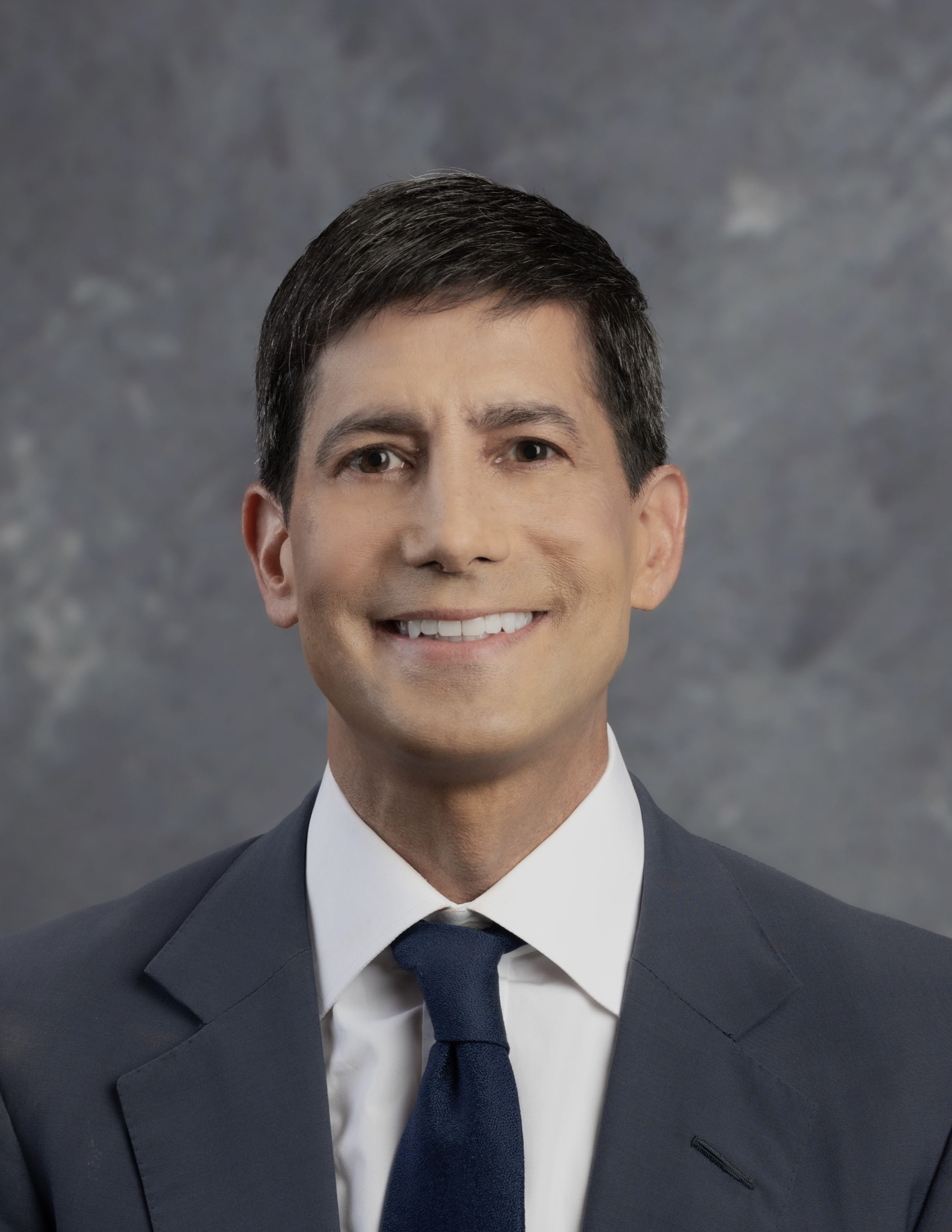
- Incumbent; Kevin Warsh since May 22, 2026
- United States Federal Reserve System
- Style: Mr. Chairman
- Member of: Board of Governors; Open Market Committee
- Reports to: United States Congress
- Seat: Eccles Building; Washington, D.C.
- Appointer: The president; with Senate advice and consent
- Term length: Four years, renewable (as chair) 14 years, non-renewable (as governor)
- Constituting instrument: Federal Reserve Act
- Formation: August 10, 1914; 112 years ago
- First holder: Charles Sumner Hamlin
- Deputy: Vice Chair of the Federal Reserve
- Salary: Executive Schedule, Level I
- Website: Official website

The chair of the Board of Governors of the Federal Reserve System is the head of the Federal Reserve, the central bank of the United States. The incumbent is the active executive officer of the Board of the Federal Reserve System. The chair presides over the meetings of the board who collectively convene to set American monetary policy.

The chair serves a four-year term after being nominated by the president of the United States and confirmed by the United States Senate; the officeholder serves concurrently as a member of the Board of Governors. The chair may serve multiple terms, subject to re-nomination and confirmation each time; William McChesney Martin (1951–1970) was the longest serving chair, with Alan Greenspan (1987–2006) closely second.

== Appointment ==
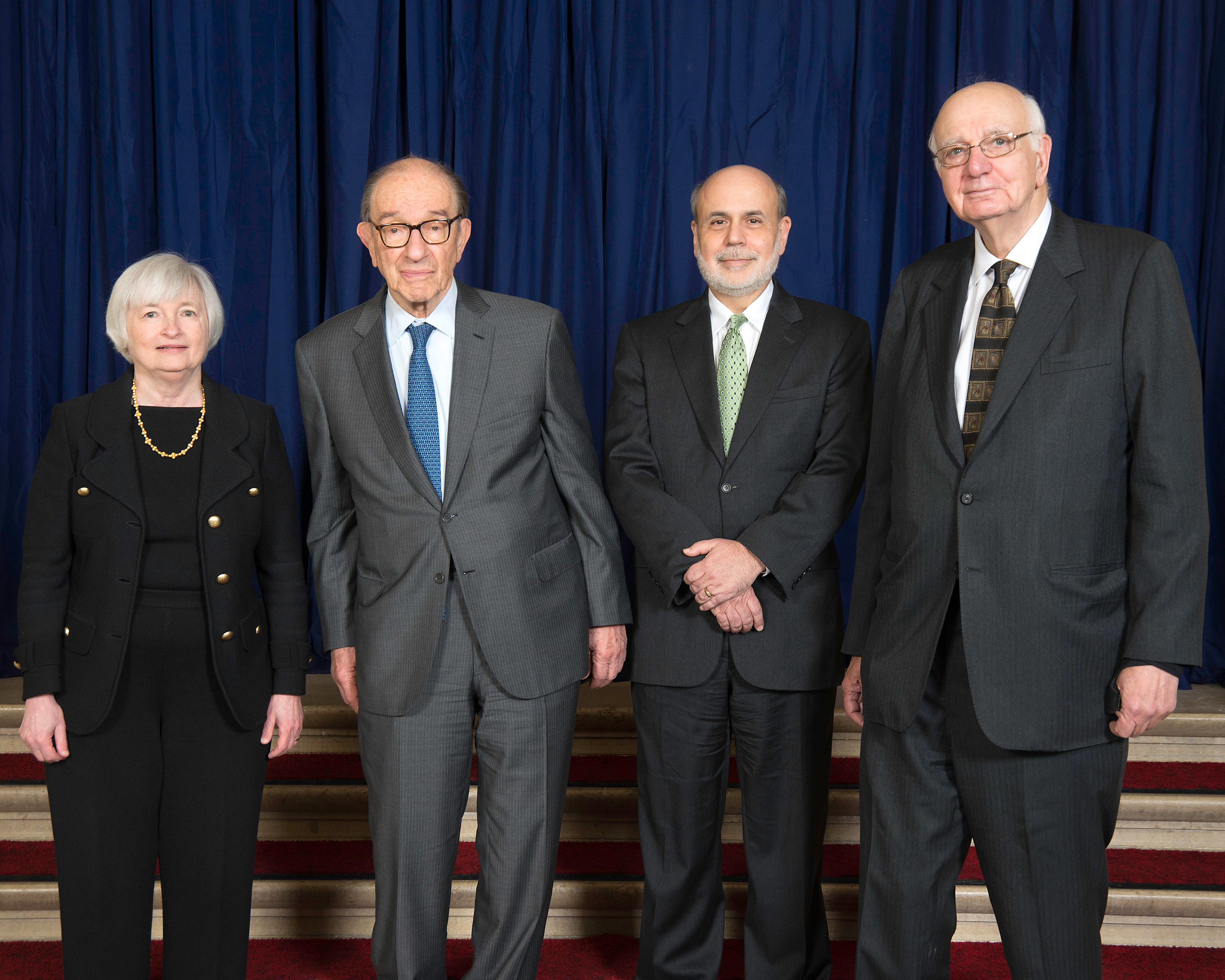
Federal Reserve chairs (left to right): Janet Yellen, Alan Greenspan, Ben Bernanke, and Paul Volcker. Photo taken 1 May 2014, when Yellen was chair.

As stipulated by the Banking Act of 1935, the chairman is chosen by the president from among the sitting governors to serve four-year terms with the advice and consent of the Senate. The Senate Committee responsible for vetting a Federal Reserve chair nominee is the Senate Committee on Banking.

== Duties ==
By law, at meetings of the board the chair presides, or in the absence of the chair, the vice chair presides. In the absence of the chair and the vice chair, the board elects a member to act as chair pro tempore.

Under the chair's leadership, the Board's responsibilities include analysis of domestic and international financial and economic developments. The board also supervises and regulates the Federal Reserve Banks, exercises responsibility in the nation's payments system, and administers consumer credit protection laws.

By custom, the chair also chairs the Federal Open Market Committee (FOMC), which directs short-term U.S. monetary policy. Although the statute and rules of the FOMC allow it to elect any member as its chair, it has always chosen the chair of the board in practice.

By law, the chair reports twice a year to Congress on the Federal Reserve's monetary policy objectives. The chair of the Federal Reserve also testifies before Congress on numerous other financial issues and meets periodically with the treasury secretary, who is a member of the president's Cabinet.

== Conflict of interest law ==
The law applicable to the chair and all other members of the board provides (in part):

No member of the Board of Governors of the Federal Reserve System shall be an officer or director of any bank, banking institution, trust company, or Federal Reserve bank or hold stock in any bank, banking institution, or trust company; and before entering upon his duties as a member of the Board of Governors of the Federal Reserve System he shall certify under oath that he has complied with this requirement, and such certification shall be filed with the secretary of the Board.

== Salary ==
The chair of the Federal Reserve is a Level I position in the Executive Schedule, thus earning the salary for that level (US$246,400, as of April 2024).

== List of Fed chairs ==
Following the enactment of the Federal Reserve Act on December 23, 1913, the United States secretary of the treasury, William Gibbs McAdoo became responsible for overseeing of the establishment of the Federal Reserve system. He became the ex officio chairman of the Federal Reserve Board and a member of the Reserve Bank Organization Committee (RBOC). Until the Banking Act of 1935 was signed into law on Aug. 23, 1935 and became effective on Feb. 1, 1936, the incumbent treasury secretary had also been the ex officio Fed chair, whilst the de facto active head of the central bank was known as the governor of the Federal Reserve Board. The 1935 Act ended ex-officio membership of the treasury secretary, re-designating the governor as the chairman of the Board of Governors.

Since Alan Greenspan's term beginning in 1987, Fed chairs have largely been economists with a doctorate in economics, with the exception of Jerome Powell and Kevin Warsh, who had each been a lawyer and investment banker before the start of his term. Arthur Burns had been the first Fed chair to have a PhD in economics, although his two successors prior to Greenspan did not. Some economists have argued that a Fed chair ought to have a PhD in economics.

The following is a list of the past and present chairs of the Board of Governors of the Federal Reserve System as well as governors of the Federal Reserve Board prior to the 1935 Act taking effect. A chair serves for a four-year term after appointment, but may be reappointed for several further four-year terms. Since the Federal Reserve was established in 1914, the following people have served as chair. (Note: The position was established as Governor of the Federal Reserve Board on December 23, 1913; thereafter became chairman of the Board of Governors of the Federal Reserve System on August 23, 1935; and re-aligned to be gender-neutral after Yellen became the first female officeholder on February 3, 2014.)

#	Name (birth–death)	Term (Note: The start date given here for each officeholder is the day they took the oath of office, and the end date is the day of their term expiration, resignation, or retirement.)		Duration	Appointer (Note: A fixed term with reappointment for the Chair, then known as Governor, was not added to the Federal Reserve Act until the Banking Act of 1935 (P.L. 74-305, 49 Stat. 684).)	Experience	Education
#	Name (birth–death)	Start	End	Duration	Appointer	Experience	Education
–	William Gibbs McAdoo (1863–1941)	December 23, 1913	August 10, 1914	230 days	ex officio (Note: Upon enactment of the Federal Reserve Act on December 23, 1913, the United States Secretary of the Treasury became ex officio chairman of the Federal Reserve Board and a member of the Reserve Bank Organization Committee (RBOC); all appointed officeholders, from William Gibbs McAdoo to Henry Morgenthau Jr., concurrently served in the position until the Banking Act of 1935 was signed into law on Aug. 23, 1935, which became effective on Feb. 1, 1936. That legislation ceased ex-officio membership, and the active executive officer (previously called the governor of the Federal Reserve Board) became the chairman of the Board of Governors. For purposes of this list, the governor has been perceived as the head of the Federal Reserve System since the establishment of that position on August 10, 1914, because the treasury secretary is a political appointee who can be dismissed by the president of the United States at any time, whereas the Federal Reserve has been created as an independent government agency.)	Lawyer; Secretary of the Treasury	University of Tennessee (BA)
1	Charles Hamlin (1861–1938)	August 10, 1914	August 9, 1916	1 year, 365 days	Woodrow Wilson	Lawyer; Assistant Secretary of the Treasury	Harvard University (BA, MA)
2	William Harding (1864–1930)	August 10, 1916	August 9, 1922	5 years, 364 days	Woodrow Wilson	Banker; Member of the Federal Reserve Board	University of Alabama (BA, MA)
3	Daniel Crissinger (1860–1942)	May 1, 1923	September 15, 1927	4 years, 137 days	Warren G. Harding	Lawyer; Comptroller of the Currency	University of Akron (BS); University of Cincinnati (LLB)
4	Roy Young (1882–1960)	October 4, 1927	August 31, 1930	2 years, 331 days	Calvin Coolidge	Banker; President of the Federal Reserve Bank of Minneapolis	
5	Eugene Meyer (1875–1959)	September 16, 1930	May 10, 1933	2 years, 236 days	Herbert Hoover	Financier	Yale University (BA)
6	Eugene Black (1873–1934)	May 19, 1933	August 15, 1934	1 year, 88 days	Franklin D. Roosevelt	Lawyer; President of the Federal Reserve Bank of Atlanta	University of Georgia (BA); Atlanta Law School (LLB)
7	Marriner Eccles (1890–1977)	November 15, 1934	January 31, 1948 (Note: Served as chairman pro tempore from February 3 to April 15, 1948.)	13 years, 77 days	Franklin D. Roosevelt	Banker	
8	Thomas McCabe (1893–1982)	April 15, 1948	March 31, 1951	2 years, 350 days	Harry S. Truman	Business executive	Swarthmore College (BA)
9	William McChesney Martin (1906–1998)	April 2, 1951	January 31, 1970	18 years, 304 days	Harry S. Truman; Dwight D. Eisenhower; John F. Kennedy; Lyndon B. Johnson	Financier; President of the New York Stock Exchange	Yale University (BA); Columbia University (attended)
10	Arthur Burns (1904–1987)	February 1, 1970	January 31, 1978 (Note: Served as chairman pro tempore from February 1 to March 8, 1978.)	7 years, 364 days	Richard Nixon; Gerald Ford	Economist; Chair of the Council of Economic Advisers; Counselor to the President	Columbia University (BA, MA, PhD)
11	William Miller (1925–2006)	March 8, 1978	August 6, 1979	1 year, 151 days	Jimmy Carter	Lawyer, investment banker, business executive	Amarillo College (attended); United States Coast Guard Academy (BS); University of California, Berkeley (LLB)
12	Paul Volcker (1927–2019)	August 6, 1979	August 11, 1987	8 years, 5 days	Jimmy Carter; Ronald Reagan	Economist; President of the Federal Reserve Bank of New York	Princeton University (BA); Harvard University (MA); London School of Economics (attended)
13	Alan Greenspan (1926–2026)	August 11, 1987 (Note: Served as chairman pro tempore from March 3 to June 20, 1996, while awaiting confirmation by the United States Senate for his third term as chairman.)	January 31, 2006	18 years, 173 days	Ronald Reagan; George H. W. Bush; Bill Clinton; George W. Bush	Economist; Chair of the Council of Economic Advisers	New York University (BA, MA, PhD); Columbia University (attended)
14	Ben Bernanke (born 1953)	February 1, 2006	January 31, 2014	7 years, 364 days	George W. Bush; Barack Obama	Economist; Chair of the Council of Economic Advisers	Harvard University (BA, MA); Massachusetts Institute of Technology (PhD)
15	Janet Yellen (born 1946)	February 3, 2014	February 3, 2018	4 years, 0 days	Barack Obama; Donald Trump	Economist; Vice Chair of the Federal Reserve; President of the Federal Reserve Bank of San Francisco; Chair of the Council of Economic Advisers	Brown University (BA); Yale University (MA, PhD)
16	Jerome Powell (born 1953)	February 5, 2018 (Note: Served as chair pro tempore from February 5 to May 23, 2022, while awaiting confirmation by the United States Senate for his second term as chair.)	May 22, 2026 (Note: Served as the acting Chairman of the Federal Reserve from May 15 to May 22, 2026, while awaiting his successor being sworn in.)	8 years, 106 days	Donald Trump; Joe Biden; Donald Trump	Lawyer and investment banker Under Secretary of the Treasury for Domestic Finance; Assistant Secretary of the Treasury for Financial Institutions	Princeton University (BA); Georgetown University (JD)
17	Kevin Warsh (born 1970)	May 22, 2026	Incumbent	120 days	Donald Trump	Investment banker and financier Member of the Federal Reserve Board of Governors	Stanford University (BA); Harvard University (JD)

== See also ==
- Federal Reserve Board of Governors
- History of central banking in the United States
