= War Finance Corporation =

American government corporation

The War Finance Corporation was a government corporation in the United States created to give financial support to industries essential for World War I, and to banking institutions that aided such industries. It continued to give support to various efforts during the interwar period. The corporation was created by a Congressional act of April 5, 1918, and abolished on July 1, 1939.

Since government borrowing to pay for the war had attracted a majority of private capital, little capital was available for corporations to borrow; the War Finance Corporation was established to make such capital available. After the armistice in late 1918, the Corporation assisted in the transition to peacetime by financing railroads under government control, and making loans to American exporters and agricultural cooperative marketing associations. The Corporation established agricultural loan agencies in farming areas, and cooperated with several livestock loan companies. Eugene Meyer, a wealthy and ambitious Wall Street financier, was its managing director.
