= Edmund Platt =

American politician and businessmen (1865–1939)

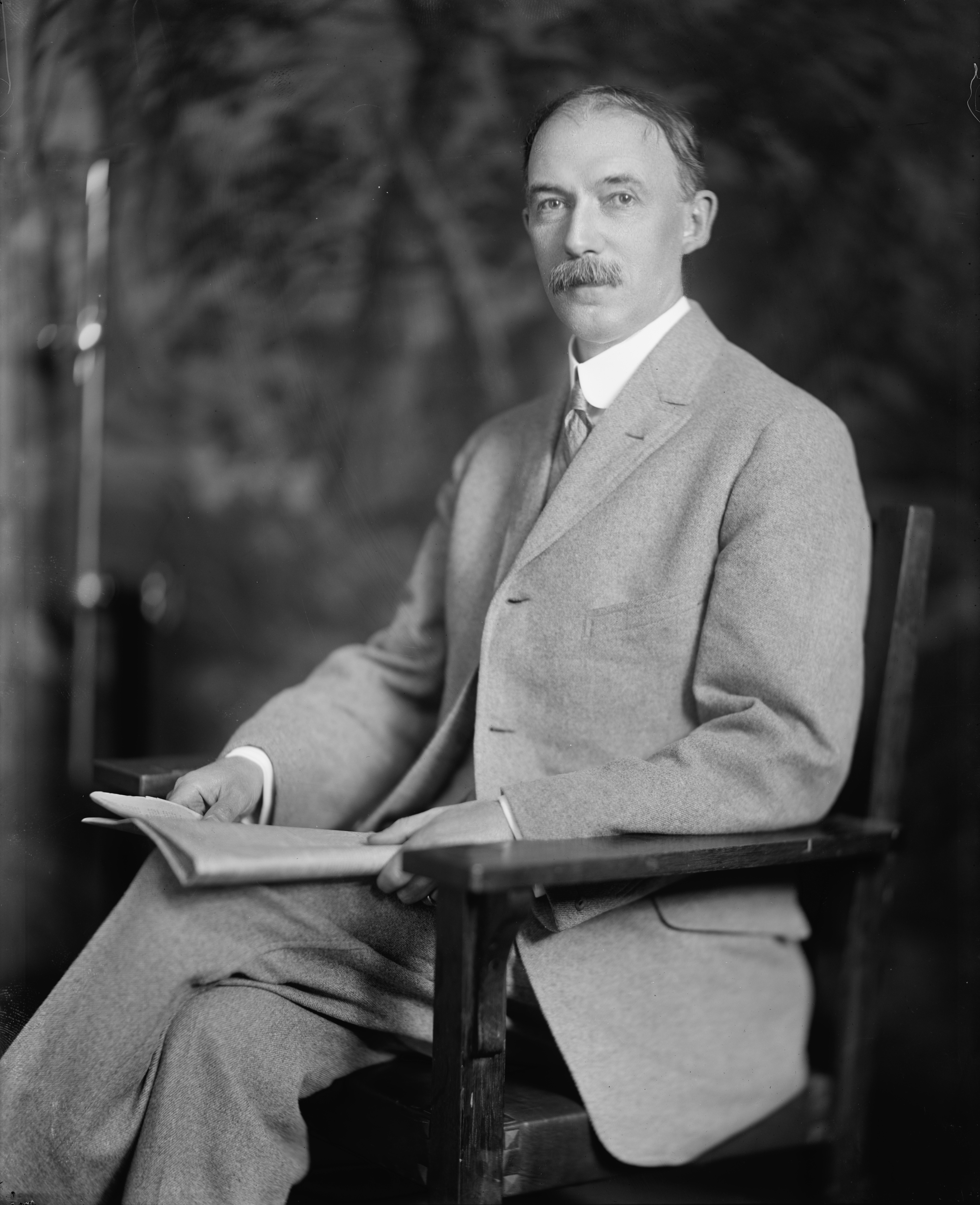

4th Vice Chairman of the Federal Reserve
- In office July 23, 1920 – September 14, 1930
- President: Woodrow Wilson; Warren G. Harding; Calvin Coolidge; Herbert Hoover
- Preceded by: Albert Strauss
- Succeeded by: John Thomas

Member of the Federal Reserve Board
- In office June 20, 1920 – September 14, 1930
- President: Woodrow Wilson; Warren G. Harding; Calvin Coolidge; Herbert Hoover
- Preceded by: Albert Strauss
- Succeeded by: Eugene Meyer

Member of the U.S. House of Representatives from New York's 26th district
- In office March 4, 1913 – June 7, 1920
- Preceded by: Edwin Albert Merritt
- Succeeded by: Hamilton Fish III

Personal details
- Born: Edmund Platt; February 2, 1865 Poughkeepsie, New York, U.S.
- Died: August 7, 1939 (aged 74) Chazy, New York, U.S.
- Resting place: Poughkeepsie Rural Cemetery
- Party: Republican
- Education: Eastman Business College; Harvard University (BA)

Edmund Platt (February 2, 1865 – August 7, 1939) was an American politician and corporate executive who served as the 4th vice chairman of the Federal Reserve from 1920 to 1930. A member of the Republican Party, he had represented New York's 26th congressional district in the United States House of Representatives for four terms from 1913 to 1920.

== Biography ==
Born in Poughkeepsie, New York he attended a private school and Riverview Academy. He graduated from Eastman Business College in Poughkeepsie and learned the printer's trade. He graduated from Harvard University in 1888 and taught school and studied law.

=== Early career ===
He moved to Wisconsin and edited the Superior Evening Telegram in 1890 and 1891. He returned to Poughkeepsie in 1891 and engaged in editing and publishing the Poughkeepsie Eagle; he was also a member of the board of water commissioners of Poughkeepsie.

=== Congress ===
Platt was elected as a Republican to the Sixty-third and to the three succeeding Congresses and held office from March 4, 1913 to June 7, 1920, when he resigned to accept appointment by President Woodrow Wilson to the Federal Reserve Board.

While in the House of Representatives, he was chairman of the Committee on Banking and Currency (Sixty-sixth Congress).

=== Federal Reserve ===
Platt became vice chairman of the Federal Reserve Board in August 1920 and served until 1930 when he resigned. Ironically, as a congressman he voted against the creation of the Federal Reserve in 1913.

=== Later career ===
He returned to Poughkeepsie and engaged in an extensive banking business.

=== Death and burial ===
Platt died in Chazy, New York while on a visit in 1939; interment was in the Poughkeepsie Rural Cemetery.

U.S. House of Representatives
Preceded by Edwin Merritt	Member of the U.S. House of Representatives from New York's 26th congressional district 1913–1920	Succeeded by Hamilton Fish III
Preceded by Michael Phelan	Chair of the House Financial Services Committee; 1919–1920	Succeeded by Louis McFadden
Government offices
Preceded by Albert Strauss	Member of the Federal Reserve Board of Governors; 1920–1930	Succeeded by Eugene Meyer
Preceded by Albert Strauss	Vice Chair of the Federal Reserve; 1920–1930	Succeeded by John Thomas
