= Paul Craig Roberts =

American economist and author (born 1939)

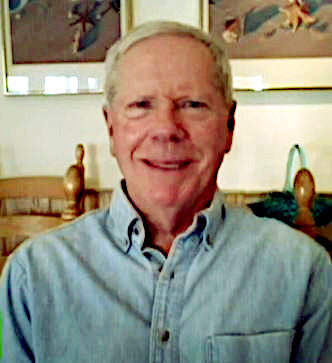
- Roberts on RT America

United States Assistant Secretary of the Treasury for Economic Policy
- President: Ronald Reagan
- Preceded by: Curtis A. Hessler
- Succeeded by: Manuel H. Johnson

Personal details
- Born: April 3, 1939 (age 87) Atlanta, Georgia, U.S.
- Education: University of Virginia (PhD); Georgia Institute of Technology (BS)
- Occupation: Economist, Author
- Awards: Legion of Honour
- Website: https://www.paulcraigroberts.org/

Paul Craig Roberts (born April 3, 1939) is an American economist and author. He formerly held a sub-cabinet office in the United States federal government as well as teaching positions at several U.S. universities. He is a promoter of supply-side economics and an opponent of recent U.S. foreign policy.

Roberts received a doctorate from the University of Virginia where he studied under G. Warren Nutter. He worked as an analyst and adviser at the United States Congress where he was credited as the primary author of the original draft of the Economic Recovery Tax Act of 1981. He was the United States Assistant Secretary of the Treasury for Economic Policy under President Ronald Reagan and – after leaving government – held the William E. Simon chair in economics at the Center for Strategic and International Studies for ten years and served on several corporate boards. A former associate editor at The Wall Street Journal, his articles have also appeared in The New York Times and Harper's, and he is the author of more than a dozen books and a number of peer-reviewed papers.

Since retiring, he has been accused of conspiracy theorizing.

== Early life and education ==
Paul Craig Roberts III was born in Atlanta, Georgia on April 3, 1939, to Paul Craig Roberts and Ellen Roberts (née Dryman).

Roberts received a Bachelor of Science degree in industrial management from the Georgia Institute of Technology where he was initiated into the Phi Delta Theta fraternity. After university, in 1961, he was awarded a Lisle Fellowship to undertake a tour of the Soviet Union. According to a later profile of Roberts in The New York Times, his experience watching a queue for meat in Tashkent led to him becoming "born again" as an adherent of supply side economics.

Upon his return to the United States, Roberts enrolled in graduate courses at the University of California Berkeley and Stanford University, before earning a PhD in economics from the University of Virginia where he studied as a Thomas Jefferson Scholar. His dissertation, prepared under the supervision of G. Warren Nutter, was titled An Administrative Analysis of Oskar Lange's Theory of Socialist Planning and evolved what Roberts described as "seminal but neglected" ideas set-out by Michael Polanyi in his 1951 text The Logic of Liberty.

On completion of his doctoral studies, Roberts spent a year on a research fellowship at the University of Oxford, where he was a member of Merton College.

== Career ==
=== Early career ===
Roberts began his career with teaching assignments at Virginia Polytechnic Institute, the University of New Mexico, Stanford University, and Tulane University. He was a professor of business administration and professor of economics at George Mason University and was the inaugural William E. Simon Chair in Political Economy at Georgetown University, serving for 12 years. While a visiting professor at Georgetown University, he was hired as economics counsel to United States Congressman Jack Kemp, later also serving as economics counsel to United States Senator Orrin Hatch, as staff associate with the Defense Appropriations Subcommittee, and as chief economist with the minority staff of the United States House of Representatives Committee on the Budget. He has been credited as the primary author of the original draft of the Economic Recovery Tax Act of 1981.

During this time, he also contributed columns to Harper's and The New York Times and served as associate editor of The Wall Street Journal's opinion page.

=== Later career ===
In December 1980, along with Alan Greenspan and Herbert Stein, Roberts was one of the three speakers at the two-day National Forum on Jobs, Money and People at the Innisbrook Resort and Golf Club in Palm Harbor, Florida. Two months later, in 1981, he was appointed by President of the United States Ronald Reagan as Assistant Secretary of the Treasury for Economic Policy. As Assistant Treasury Secretary he was a driver behind the economic policy of the first term of the Reagan administration and was lauded as the "economic conscience of Ronald Reagan". Nonetheless, his singular zealousness for supply-side economics provoked ire in some quarters within the government, with Larry Kudlow – then an official in the Office of Management and Budget – saying that "Craig saw himself as the keeper of the Reagan flame. Only Craig knew what was right. No one else knew what was right". Roberts' concern about U.S. budget deficits led him into conflict with other Reagan-era officials such as Martin Feldstein and David Stockman.

Roberts resigned in February 1982 to return to academia. He was a senior research fellow at the Hoover Institution, from 1983 to 1993 was the William E. Simon Chair in Political Economy at the Center for Strategic and International Studies and, from 1993 to 1996, a distinguished fellow at the Cato Institute.

From 1983 to 2019, Roberts served as a board director of nine different Value Line investment funds. Between 1992 and 2006 he sat on the board of directors of A. Schulman and, according to the company, was its longest-serving independent director at the time of his retirement.

==== Post-retirement writing and media ====
In the 2000s, Roberts wrote columns for Creators Syndicate. Later, he contributed to CounterPunch, becoming one of its most popular writers. He has been a regular guest on programs broadcast by RT. As of 2008, he was part of the editorial collective of the far right website VDARE. He has been funded by the Unz Foundation. His writings are published by Veterans Today, InfoWars, PressTV and GlobalResearch, and he is frequently a guest on the podcasts, radio shows and video channels of the Council of Conservative Citizens, Max Keiser and 9/11 truther Kevin Barrett. His own website publishes the work of Israel Shamir and Diana Johnstone.

== Work ==
=== Views ===
==== Economic policy ====
Roberts' commitment to supply-side economics has been a dominant feature of his career. Writing in 1984, Thomas B. Silver said that adherents of supply-side economics had "no more formidable advocate in their ranks" than Roberts. However, Roberts has expressed skepticism at the ability of government to lower taxes and decrease regulation, positing that the personal political ambition of officeholders tends to promote meddling in the economy, a criticism he has directed even at the former Reagan administration of which he was a part.

Ron Hira of the Economic Policy Institute has described Roberts as one of the first prominent economists to "break from the orthodoxy" by opposing offshoring; Roberts believes that the practice is "lethal for America's future". According to him, "a country that doesn't make anything doesn’t need a financial sector as there is nothing to finance". In 2004, Paul Blustein in The Washington Post described him as heretical in relation to mainstream US economics for challenging the positive impact of free trade.

Roberts is also a critic of the Federal Reserve System and central banking in general.

==== Society and culture ====
According to Roberts, "the West in general suffers from an excess of skepticism about its own values and accomplishments. We're being gobbled up by nihilism, itself the product of unbridled skepticism. It's hard to anchor on to the verities anymore". He has expressed his opposition to Affirmative Action policies and dismissed the existence of white male privilege. In an opinion column for Scripps Howard News Service in 1997, Roberts opposed gender integration aboard U.S. Navy vessels, opining that gender integration would destroy the "ethos of comradeship" which, in his view, motivated wartime sacrifice more than "abstract concepts such as honor and country".

In The New Color Line (1995), Roberts and co-author Lawrence M. Stratton argue that the Civil Rights Act was subverted by the bureaucrats who applied it.

He believes the US is a police state.

==== Drug policy ====
Writing in 1995, Roberts expressed skepticism at the war on drugs, saying that it "perfectly illustrates the maxim 'the road to hell is paved with good intentions'." In The Tyranny of Good Intentions (2000), Roberts and co-author Lawrence Stratton argued that the opposition of some American conservatives to drug-policy reform was an example of "the right's myopia".

==== Foreign policy ====
He is a strong opponent of neoconservatism, saying, "the neocons are the worst thing that ever happened to the United States. (They’re) really the scum of the earth… They should all be picked up and shipped out of the country. They all belong in Israel. That’s where they should be. Pick ’em up, ship ’em to Israel, revoke their passports."

Roberts has stated his opposition to United States involvement in the post-2001 War in Afghanistan and to the 2003 invasion of Iraq. According to Roberts, "the Bush regime’s response to 9/11 and the Obama regime’s validation of this response have destroyed accountable, democratic government in the United States". He believes the US is a puppet government of Israel.

He supports Russian president Vladimir Putin, blames Euromaidan and the Syrian civil war on a neocon plot, and argues that human rights NGOs working in Russia are part of a “US fifth column” working to undermine its government.

==== Charges of conspiracy theorizing ====
Writing in USA Today, Darrell Delamaide has described Roberts as a "conspiracy theorist", a charge echoed by Luke Brinker of Salon, and Michael C. Moynihan of The Daily Beast, who has also described him as partaking in "Putin worship". Roberts has rejected the label and, in turn, described Jonathan Chait and Amy Knight as conspiracy theorists.

Roberts has described himself as a "9/11 skeptic" and spoken at 9/11 Truth movement events. Regarding the assassination of John F. Kennedy, Roberts has written that "all evidence pointed to a plot by the Joint Chiefs, CIA, and Secret Service whose right-wing leaders had concluded that President Kennedy was too 'soft on communism'". He has also stated that the Charlie Hebdo shooting has many of the characteristics of a false flag operation" motivated in part “to stifle the growing European sympathy for the Palestinians and to realign Europe with Israel”. The Washington Post noted that in 2014 Roberts speculated on his blog that Ebola originated as a US bioweapon and this was picked up by North Korea's state media. In 2003, the Southern Poverty Law Center criticized Roberts for promoting the antisemitic Cultural Marxism conspiracy theory in a review of Pat Buchanan’s The Death of the West.

==== Views on World War II and the Holocaust ====
In 2019, Roberts wrote in support of the views of Holocaust denier David Irving, asserting that "Irving, without any doubt the best historian of the European part of World War II, learned at his great expense that challenging myths does not go unpunished... I will avoid the story of how this came to be, but, yes, you guessed it, it was the Zionists". Roberts added that "No German plans, or orders from Hitler, or from Himmler or anyone else have ever been found for an organized holocaust by gas and cremation of Jews... The "death camps" were in fact work camps. Auschwitz, for example, today a Holocaust museum, was the site of Germany's essential artificial rubber factory. Germany was desperate for a work force."

== Personal life ==
Roberts' wife, Linda, was born in the United Kingdom and professionally trained in ballet. The couple met while he was at the University of Oxford.

== Honors and recognition ==
In 1981, Roberts was decorated with the United States Treasury Meritorious Service Award for "outstanding contributions to the formulation of United States economic policy".

In 1987, he was invested into the French Legion of Honour at the rank of chevalier (knight) for his services to economics.

In 2015, Roberts received the International Journalism Award for Political Analysis from Club de Periodistas de Mexico.

In 2017, Roberts received the Lifetime Achievement Award from Marquis Who's Who.

=== Works ===
==== Books ====
- Alienation and the Soviet Economy: Toward a General Theory of Marxian Alienation, Organizational Principles, and the Soviet Economy (University of New Mexico Press, 1971) ISBN 0826302084
- Marx's Theory of Exchange, Alienation, and Crisis (Hoover Institution Press, 1973; 1983) ISBN 0817933611 (Spanish language edition: 1974)
- The Supply Side Revolution: An Insider's Account of Policymaking in Washington (Harvard University Press, 1984) ISBN 0674856201 (Chinese language edition: 2012)
- Warren Nutter, an Economist for All Time (American Enterprise Institute for Public Policy Research, 1984) ISBN 0844713694
- Meltdown: Inside the Soviet Economy (Cato Institute, 1990) ISBN 0932790801
- The Capitalist Revolution in Latin America (Oxford University Press, 1997) ISBN 0195111761 (Spanish language edition: 1999)
- Alienation and the Soviet Economy: The Collapse of the Socialist Era (Independent Institute, 1999: 2nd edition) ISBN 094599964X
- The New Color Line: How Quotas and Privilege Destroy Democracy (Regnery Publishing, 1997) ISBN 0895264234
- The Tyranny of Good Intentions: How Prosecutors and Bureaucrats Are Trampling the Constitution in the Name of Justice (2000) ISBN 076152553X (Broadway Books, 2008: new edition)
- Chile: Dos Visiones La Era Allende-Pinochet (Universidad Andres Bello, 2000). Joint author: Karen LaFollette Araujo. Spanish language.
- How the Economy Was Lost: The War of the Worlds (AK Press, 2010) ISBN 978-1849350075
- Wirtschaft Am Abgrund: Der Zusammenbruch der Volkswirtschaften und das Scheitern der Globalisierung (Weltbuch Verlag GmbH, 2012) ISBN 978-3938706381. German language.
- Chile: Dos Visiones, La era Allende-Pinochet (2000) ISBN 9562841340
- The Failure of Laissez Faire Capitalism and Economic Dissolution of the West (Clarity Press, 2013) ISBN 0986036250
- How America was Lost. From 9/11 to the Police/Warfare State (Clarity Press, 2014) ISBN 978-0986036293
- The Neoconservative Threat to World Order: Washington's Perilous War for Hegemony (Clarity Press, 2015) ISBN 0986076996
- Amerikas Krieg gegen die Welt... und gegen seine eigenen Ideale (Kopp Verlag, 2015) ISBN 386445221X

==== Journal articles ====
- Roberts, Paul Craig; Brown, Norman (January 1969). "The Economics of the Right to Work Controversy: Revisited". Southern Economic Journal. 35 (3): 265–266. doi:10.2307/1056540. JSTOR 1056540.
- Roberts, Paul Craig; Brown, Norman (April 1969). "The Polycentric Soviet Economy". Journal of Law and Economics. 12 (1): 163–179. doi:10.1086/466664. JSTOR 724984. S2CID 154050695.
- Roberts, Paul Craig; Brown, Norman (April 1969). "Politics and Science: A Critique of Buchanan's Assessment of Polanyi". Ethics. 79 (3): 235–241. doi:10.1086/291728. JSTOR 2379846. S2CID 145453222.
- Roberts, Paul Craig (June 1970). ""War Communism": A Re-Examination". Slavic Review. 29 (2): 238–261. doi:10.2307/2493378. JSTOR 2493378.
- Roberts, Paul Craig (August 28, 1970). "Confrontation Tactics". Science. 169 (3948): 816. Bibcode:1970Sci...169..816R. doi:10.1126/science.169.3948.816. JSTOR 1729709. PMID 17750046.
- Roberts, Paul Craig; Stephenson, Matthew (November 1970). "A Note on Marxian Alienation". Oxford Economic Papers. 22 (3): 438–442. doi:10.1093/oxfordjournals.oep.a041176. JSTOR 2662543.
- Roberts, Paul Craig (July 1971). "Marx's Classification of Economic Systems and the Soviet Economy". Soviet Studies. 23 (1): 96–102. doi:10.1080/09668137108410789. JSTOR 149721.
- Roberts, Paul Craig (Spring 1971). "An Organization Model of the Market". Public Choice. 10: 81–92. doi:10.1007/BF01718623. JSTOR 30022639. S2CID 153609832.
- Roberts, Paul Craig (June 1972). "Revealed Planners' Preferences Once Again: A Rebuttal to Drewnowski". Journal of Political Economy. 80 (3): 608–611. doi:10.1086/259912. JSTOR 1830574. S2CID 153397057.
- Roberts, Paul Craig (Spring 1973). "A Diagrammatic Exposition of an Economic Theory of Imperialism". Public Choice. 14: 101–107. doi:10.1007/BF01718444. JSTOR 30022705. S2CID 154734485.
- Roberts, Paul Craig (October 1986). "Problems With Monetary Policy". Business Economics. 21 (4): 16–20. JSTOR 23484312.
- Roberts, Paul Craig (Summer 1990). "Up from Mercantilism: Solving the Latin Debt Mess". The National Interest (20): 63–70. JSTOR 42894681.
- Roberts, Paul Craig (September 1998). "A Reconsideration of the Welfare State". Proceedings of the American Philosophical Society. 142 (3): 396–398. JSTOR 3152245.
- Roberts, Paul Craig (Fall 2000). "What Really Happened in 1981". The Independent Review. 5 (2): 279–281. JSTOR 24562652.
- Roberts, Paul Craig (Winter 2003). "My Time with Supply-Side Economics". The Independent Review. 7 (3): 393–397. JSTOR 24562450.

==== Popular articles ====
- Roberts, Paul Craig (August 4, 1978). "The Tax Reform Trap". Arizona Daily Star.
- Roberts, Paul Craig (March 28, 1995). "Deficit Ogre Shouldn't Stop GOP Tax Cut". Los Angeles Times. Creator's Syndicate.
- Roberts, Paul Craig (February 25, 1996). "There's a Lot to Like About this Man". Press & Sun-Bulletin. Scripps Howard News Service.
- Roberts, Paul Craig (March 13, 1998). "A History Lesson on the Land of Liberty". Tampa Tribune. Creator's Syndicate.
- Roberts, Paul Craig (February 26, 2013). "One Nation, Under Monsanto". CounterPunch.
- Roberts, Paul Craig (November 9, 2016). "The Working Class Won the Election". CounterPunch. Archived from the original on January 22, 2019.
- Roberts, Paul Craig (April 26, 2017). "The Looting Machine Called Capitalism". CounterPunch.
