= Thomas Silver =

Thomas Silver may refer to:

- Thomas Silver (musician), guitarist with Hardcore Superstar
- Thomas B. Silver (1947–2001), author, scholar and president of the Claremont Institute

== See also ==
- Thomas Silvero (born 2000), Argentine footballer
