= Douglas Elmendorf =

American economist (born 1962)

Doug Elmendorf
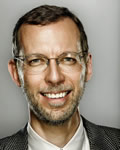

Dean of the John F. Kennedy School of Government
- In office January 1, 2016 – June 2024
- Preceded by: David T. Ellwood
- Succeeded by: Jeremy M. Weinstein

8th Director of the Congressional Budget Office
- In office January 22, 2009 – March 31, 2015
- Preceded by: Peter R. Orszag
- Succeeded by: Keith Hall

Personal details
- Born: Douglas William Elmendorf; April 16, 1962 (age 64) Poughkeepsie, New York, U.S.
- Party: Democratic
- Spouse: Karen Dynan
- Education: Princeton University (BA); Harvard University (MA, PhD)

Academic background
- Doctoral advisor: Martin Feldstein

Douglas William Elmendorf (born April 16, 1962) is an American economist who served as dean and Don K. Price Professor of Public Policy at the John F. Kennedy School of Government from 2016 to 2024. He previously served as the director of the Congressional Budget Office (CBO) from 2009 to 2015. He was a Brookings Institution senior fellow from 2007 to 2009, and briefly in 2015 following his time at the CBO, and was a director of the Hamilton Project at Brookings.

== Early life and education ==
Born in Poughkeepsie, New York, Elmendorf attended the Poughkeepsie Day School and graduated from Spackenkill High School. He spent his early career as an academic and educator. He graduated from Princeton University with an A.B. in economics in 1983 after completing a 70-page long senior thesis titled "A Prediction Model of the Market for Engineering." He then attended Harvard University to obtain his master's and Ph.D. in the same subject. After graduating in 1989, he stayed at Harvard for four years as an assistant professor, working closely with economics professor Martin Feldstein, the director of the Council of Economic Advisers under President Ronald Reagan, to teach introductory economics classes.

== Career ==
In 1993, Elmendorf moved to public life, working for the Congressional Budget Office for the first time. He spent a year as an associate analyst before joining full-time in 1994 as a principal analyst where Elmendorf focused on health-care issues and the economic effects of budget deficits. Working under Director Robert Reischauer, Elmendorf worked on a team that concluded President Bill Clinton's health reform package would cost much more than originally thought. This analysis helped cripple Clinton's attempt to reform health care.

Elmendorf only stayed a year at the CBO as a principal analyst before heading to the Federal Reserve Board as an economist under Chair Alan Greenspan. In 1998, his travels through the financial departments of the federal government continued, as Elmendorf moved to the Council of Economic Advisers, working as a senior economist under Director Janet Yellen. After staying at the CEA for a year, Elmendorf then joined the United States Treasury Department as deputy assistant secretary for economic policy, working under Clinton Treasury Secretary Lawrence Summers. When George W. Bush took office, Elmendorf moved back to the Fed as a senior economist and in 2002, he got a promotion to chief of the macroeconomics analysis team, leading a group of 30 economists and researchers as they forecasted inflation rates and labor markets.

In 2007, Elmendorf began working for the well-known economic think-tank the Brookings Institution, co-editing the twice-yearly publication "Brookings Papers on Economic Activity." In 2008, Jason Furman, the director of the Brookings' group known as the Hamilton Project left to join the Obama campaign. Elmendorf replaced him as director of the Project, a forum for economic policy discussion that was created by Bill Clinton's Treasury Secretary Robert Rubin — an advocate of free trade and a small deficit.

Testifying before the House Budget Committee in June 2011 Director Elmendorf said that "uncertainty about federal policy is diminishing household and business spending and that uncertainty covers a whole set of policies: It covers tax policy, it covers regulatory policy and it covers health policy." He noted that new figures released 30 June 2011 by the CBO show debt rising to 190 percent of the gross domestic product by 2035. Economists have warned that exceeding 90 percent of gross domestic product (GDP) is a prescription for a debt crisis. "The current level of debt is reducing our output, our incomes relative to what would be the case if we had a lower level of debt, leaving aside the effects of this particular recession, which complicate that," Elmendorf said. As of 2011 debt to GDP levels were 70%.

In August 2011 the CBO noted a dismal outlook of the nation's budget and economy, crystallizing the challenges Congress faced that fall in reducing deficits and increasing employment. CBO projected a $1.28 trillion deficit for the fiscal year, and total deficits over the following 10 years of $3.5 trillion. Gross federal debt was expected to rise from $14.8 trillion to $21.3 trillion in 2021, CBO said. "A great deal of the pain of this economic downturn still lies ahead of us," Director Elmendorf said at a Wednesday press conference after the report's release. He said the debt-ceiling deal "makes a real difference, so I guess that's good news." He then added: "I think the challenges that remain are very large."

In June 2015, Harvard University President Drew Faust announced that Elmendorf would succeed David T. Ellwood as Dean at Harvard Kennedy School. "Doug Elmendorf is an outstanding public servant, an admired mentor and teacher, and a distinguished economist deeply immersed in the interplay of research and policy — an experienced leader in government who embodies the Harvard Kennedy School's commitment to joining scholarship, education, and practice to serve the public good," Faust said in a press release. Elmendorf assumed office in January 2016. He stepped down in June 2024.

== Controversy and issues ==
Controversy arose in January 2023 when it was revealed in The Nation that Elmendorf was said to have rejected the appointment of Kenneth Roth, former head of Human Rights Watch, as a fellow at the Carr Center for Human Rights Policy at the Harvard Kennedy School over the alleged anti-Israel bias of HRW under the latter's leadership. Later in the month, Elmendorf reversed his position and Roth was planning to take up the fellowship in the next year.

In 2023, it was reported that Joan Donovan was forced to end her tenure and role at Shorenstein Center on Media, Politics and Public Policy, due to her prominence at the school and tensions between the two since 2021.

== Personal ==
Elmendorf is married to Karen Dynan, professor of the practice of economics at Harvard University, and a non-resident senior fellow at the Peterson Institute for International Economics. They live in Cambridge, Massachusetts, with their twin daughters.

"Elmendorf's mother was a math teacher, his father a computer programmer at IBM who was, Elmendorf said, in 'on the ground floor of computers.'" He is "a descendent of Elmendorfs who have populated New York's Hudson Valley since the 1600s."

Government offices
| Preceded by Peter Orszag | Director of the Congressional Budget Office; 2009–2015 | Succeeded by Keith Hall |
