= Phillip Swagel =

Director of the Congressional Budget Office

Phil Swagel
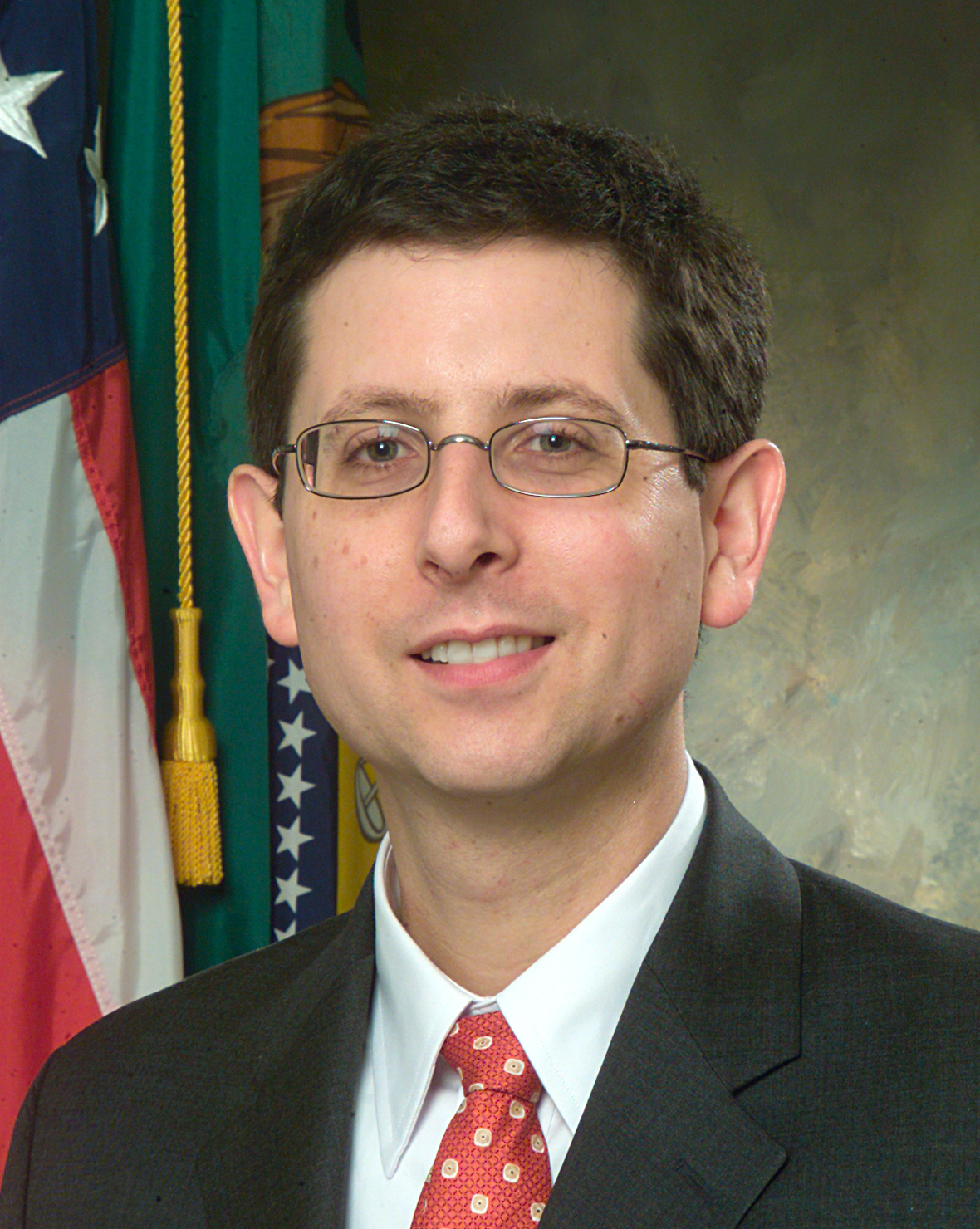

10th Director of the Congressional Budget Office
- Incumbent
- Assumed office June 3, 2019
- Preceded by: Keith Hall

Assistant Secretary of the Treasury for Economic Policy
- In office December 11, 2006 – January 20, 2009
- President: George W. Bush
- Preceded by: Mark Warshawsky
- Succeeded by: Alan B. Krueger

Personal details
- Born: June 8, 1966 (age 60) New York City, New York, U.S.
- Party: Republican
- Spouse: Judith K. Hellerstein
- Children: 3
- Education: Princeton University (BA); Harvard University (MA, PhD)

Phillip Lee Swagel (born June 8, 1966) is an American economist who is currently the director of the Congressional Budget Office. As Assistant Secretary of the Treasury for Economic Policy from 2006 to 2009, he played an important role in the Troubled Asset Relief Program that was part of the U.S. government's response to the 2008 financial crisis. He was recently a professor in International Economics at the University of Maryland School of Public Policy, a non-resident scholar at the American Enterprise Institute, senior fellow at the Milken Institute, and co-chair of the Bipartisan Policy Center's Financial Regulatory Reform Initiative.

Educated at Princeton University and Harvard University, Swagel has taught economics at Northwestern University, the University of Chicago Booth School of Business, and Georgetown University's McDonough School of Business, in addition to Maryland. He has also worked at the Federal Reserve, the International Monetary Fund, and the White House Council of Economic Advisors.

== Education and early career ==
Swagel graduated from Los Alamitos High School in Los Alamitos, California. He graduated with an A.B. in economics from Princeton University in 1987 after completing a 128-page long senior thesis titled "Examining the Competitiveness Debate: Optimal Trade Policies for Two Oligopolistic Industries." He went on to do graduate work at Harvard University, where he earned a Ph.D. in economics in 1993.

From 1992 to 1995 Swagel worked as an economist for the Federal Reserve Board of Governors, the governing body of the Federal Reserve System, the central bank of the United States. From 1994 to 1996 he taught macroeconomics and international economics as a visiting assistant professor at Northwestern University. He was an economist at the International Monetary Fund from 1996 to 2002. During this time he and Matthew J. Slaughter published a working paper asserting that changes in technology rather than globalization were responsible for increases in inequality between skilled and unskilled workers in developed countries.

Swagel began his service in government in August 2000, when he joined the White House Council of Economic Advisers as a senior economist, a position he held until July 2001. He returned to the council as chief of staff in July 2002. He was replaced in February 2005 by Gary Blank, who had been deputy policy director in President George W. Bush's re-election campaign the year before. Swagel became a resident scholar at the American Enterprise Institute (AEI) the next month.

== Treasury Department ==
After Bush appointed Henry Paulson as Secretary of the Treasury in 2006, Paulson recruited Swagel to join his staff at the Department of the Treasury. Swagel left AEI in October, and in December he was sworn in as Assistant Secretary of the Treasury for Economic Policy following confirmation by the U.S. Senate. In this role he was the Treasury Department's chief economist.

Beginning in summer 2007, the value of some financial instruments backed by U.S. subprime mortgages declined sharply as it became clear that many of the borrowers would default on the mortgages. This caused a crisis as the banks holding the mortgages saw their assets decline in value and rushed to foreclose the loans. Swagel investigated many of these mortgages for Treasury, finding that in many cases borrowers were in homes they could not afford.

In early 2008, fearing that the crisis could escalate, Paulson directed Swagel and fellow Treasury aide Neel Kashkari to write a plan to recapitalize the financial system in case of total collapse. The plan called for Congress to authorize Treasury to spend $500 billion to buy mortgage-backed securities from troubled banks, replacing them on banks' balance sheets with safe, liquid Treasury bills. This would prevent runs on the banks and encourage them to lend. The plan was conceived as an alternative to proposals from the staff of the House Financial Services Committee, then led by Democratic Representative Barney Frank.

As the 2008 financial crisis unfolded, Swagel played a key role in the U.S. government's response. He argued for bold action to stabilize the banks, and his and Kashkari's plan became the basis for the Troubled Asset Relief Program (TARP), which Kashkari ran. Swagel also sat on the five-member investment committee within Treasury that decided which financial institutions would receive TARP funds.

Shortly before leaving office, Swagel sparred with fellow economist Luigi Zingales at the annual meeting of the American Economic Association. Zingales charged the bailout had been costly and ineffective; Swagel countered that Zingales was underestimating the risks of doing nothing and neglecting legal constraints policymakers faced. Shortly after leaving office, Swagel published an account of the government's response to the 2008 financial crisis in Brookings Papers on Economic Activity. He argued that Treasury's actions to stabilize the financial system were necessary and successful but that the administration had not adequately explained its actions and reasoning to the public. He also contended that policy disorganization, legal constraints, and political considerations prevented Treasury from doing more to limit the scope of the crisis. However, at least one pundit thought Swagel sounded at times like a critic of the Bush and Obama administrations rather than the policy insider he was.

In July 2008, Washington Post columnist Dana Milbank criticized Swagel's performance at a press conference following a U.S. Labor Department jobs report showing continuing weakness in the U.S. economy.

== Post–Treasury Department ==
Swagel left the Treasury Department on January 20, 2009, the day Barack Obama was inaugurated as Bush's successor. Later that year he joined the McDonough School of Business of Georgetown University as a visiting professor and director of the school's Center for Financial Institutions, Policy, and Governance. There he taught classes on the role of financial markets in the broader economy. In 2011 he became Professor in International Economic Policy at the University of Maryland School of Public Policy. He is also an academic fellow of the Center for Financial Policy at the university's Robert H. Smith School of Business, a senior fellow at the Milken Institute, and a non-resident scholar at AEI. He has also taught classes at the University of Chicago Booth School of Business.

Since leaving Treasury, Swagel has continued to comment on economic policy. He argued against giving Treasury "resolution authority" to seize and shut down failing banks, while acknowledging the dissonance between this position and his role in TARP. Later, he came out against Daniel Tarullo's plan to limit the size of large U.S. banks, instead praising a plan proposed jointly by the Bank of England and the U.S. Federal Deposit Insurance Corporation. He made several proposals for reforming the government-sponsored enterprises Fannie Mae and Freddie Mac, one of which inspired a bill in the U.S. Senate sponsored by Senators Bob Corker and Mark Warner. He was one of several economists from the Bush administration who in 2010 supported Obama's plans to increase infrastructure spending.

Swagel is currently a professor of International Economic Policy at the University of Maryland School of Public Policy. In 2019, Swagel was nominated to be the tenth director of the Congressional Budget Office (CBO).

== Bibliography ==
- Matthew J. Slaughter, Phillip Swagel. Effect of globalization on wages in the advanced economies. International Monetary Fund working paper, April 1997
- Phillip Swagel. The financial crisis: an inside view. Brookings Papers on Economic Activity, Spring 2009, pp. 1–63
- Dan Blumenthal, Phillip Swagel. Awkward Embrace: the United States and China in the 21st Century. AEI Press, 2012. ISBN 978-0844772356
- Brent Neiman, Phillip Swagel. The Impact of Post-9/11 Visa Policies on Travel to the United States. CreateSpace Independent Publishing Platform, 2015. ISBN 978-1-5053-9065-0
- N. Gregory Mankiw and Phillip L. Swagel. Antidumping: The Third Rail of Trade Policy. (pamphlet) Foreign Affairs, July / August 2005

== Works cited ==
- Andrew Ross Sorkin. Too Big to Fail. Penguin Books, 2009, 2010. ISBN 978-0-14-311824-4
