= Lawrence F. Katz =

American economist

Larry Katz
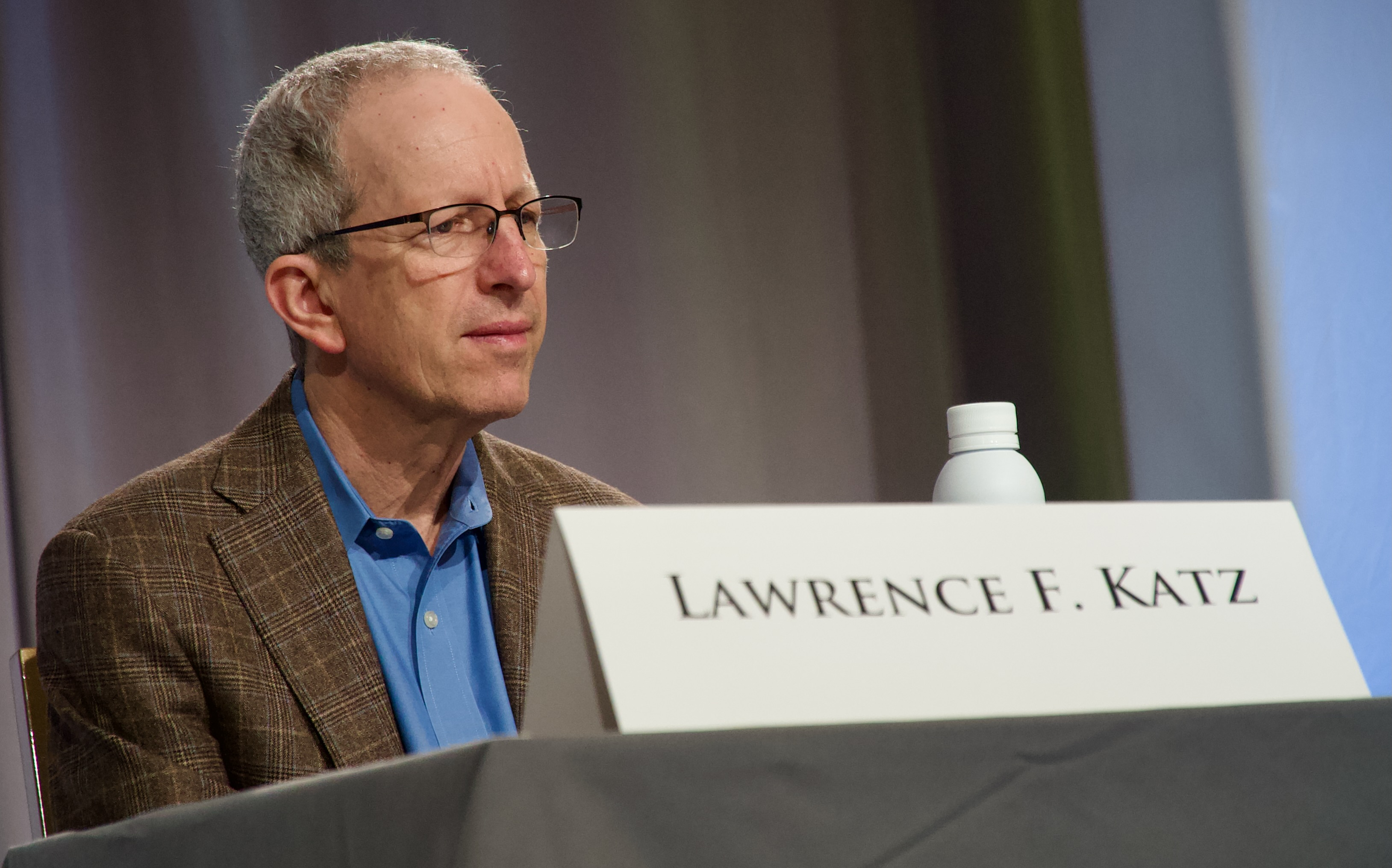
- Born: Ann Arbor, Michigan, U.S.
- Children: 3: Rebecca Katz

Academic background
- Education: University of California, Berkeley (BA); Massachusetts Institute of Technology (MA, PhD)
- Doctoral advisor: Henry Farber

Academic work
- Discipline: Labor economics
- Institutions: Harvard University
- Doctoral students: See list: Cecilia Rouse; Jon Gruber; Judith K. Hellerstein; Jeffrey Liebman; Sandra Black; Marianne Bertrand; David Autor; Mário Centeno; Bridget Terry Long; Justin Wolfers Raj Chetty; Heidi Williams
- Website: Official website; Information at IDEAS / RePEc

Lawrence Francis Katz is an American economist who is the Elisabeth Allison Professor of Economics at Harvard University and a Research Associate of the National Bureau of Economic Research.

== Education and career ==
Katz graduated from the University of California at Berkeley in 1981. He earned a Ph.D. in economics from the Massachusetts Institute of Technology in 1985.

He served as the chief economist at the U.S. Department of Labor from 1993 to 1994 under Robert Reich, Bill Clinton's then Secretary of Labor.

Katz is married to a Harvard colleague, 2023 Nobel Prize in Economics winner Claudia Goldin, and has also worked with her. They wrote the book The Race Between Education and Technology in 2008, which argued that the United States became the world's richest nation thanks to its schools. It was praised as "a monumental achievement that supplies a unified framework for interpreting how the demand and supply of human capital have shaped the distribution of earnings in the U.S. labor market over the twentieth century", and Alan Krueger of Princeton University said that it "represent[ed] the best of what economics has to offer".

Katz has been editor of the Quarterly Journal of Economics since 1991. He also serves as the Principal Investigator for the long-term evaluation of the Moving to Opportunity, a randomized housing mobility experiment. This project evaluated questions like "To what extent does where you live determine how you live?"

He is the co-Scientific Director of J-PAL North America, past President of the Society of Labor Economists, and has been elected a fellow of the National Academy of Sciences, American Academy of Arts and Sciences, the Econometric Society, and the Society of Labor Economists. Katz serves on the Panel of Economic Advisers of the Congressional Budget Office as well as on the Boards of the Russell Sage Foundation and MDRC.
