= Sidney L. Jones =

American economist

Assistant Secretary of the Treasury for Economic Policy
- In office October 31, 1989 – January 11, 1993
- President: George H. W. Bush
- Preceded by: Michael R. Darby
- Succeeded by: Alicia Munnell

Under Secretary of Commerce for Economic Affairs
- In office October 3, 1983 – November 1985
- President: Ronald Reagan
- Preceded by: Robert G. Dederick
- Succeeded by: Robert T. Ortner

Assistant Secretary of the Treasury for Economic Policy
- In office July 17, 1975 – January 20, 1977
- President: Gerald Ford
- Preceded by: Edgar Fiedler
- Succeeded by: Daniel H. Brill

Assistant Secretary of Commerce for Economic Affairs
- In office June 1973 – July 1974
- President: Richard Nixon

Personal details
- Born: September 23, 1933 (age 93) Ogden, Utah, United States
- Party: Republican
- Education: Utah State University; Stanford University
- Military career
- Allegiance: United States
- Branch: United States Army
- Service years: 1954–1956
- Rank: First Lieutenant

Sidney Lewis Jones (born September 23, 1933) is an American economist and former official in the United States federal government. Educated at Utah State University and Stanford University, he initially taught in universities until he was recruited to join the staff of the Council of Economic Advisers. From there he held a number of positions in and out of government, including senior roles in the Departments of Commerce and the Treasury. A Republican, he has held strong views during his career about controlling inflation and federal government spending but was nonetheless well regarded as an economist across the political spectrum.

== Personal life ==
Sidney Lewis Jones was born September 23, 1933, in Ogden, Utah. He is of Welsh descent. He spent a significant portion of his childhood in California, where his father earned a doctorate in bacteriology at Stanford University. In 1953 he married Marlene Stewart. They had five children.

He is a member of the Church of Jesus Christ of Latter-day Saints. He has played several leadership roles in the church: he was a bishop as of 1984 and a member of the presidency of the Washington D.C. Temple as of 2006.

== Education and military career ==
In 1954 Jones earned a B.S. in economics from Utah State University. He was valedictorian, a Distinguished Military Student, and a member of Phi Kappa Phi and Alpha Kappa Psi. He played varsity tennis, a hobby he maintained during his career as an economist. From August 1954 to September 1956 he served in the United States Army, first at Fort Lee in Virginia and then at the Sierra Army Depot in California. He left the Army as a First Lieutenant.

In 1956 Jones entered Stanford, where he earned an M.B.A. in 1958 and a Ph.D. in economics in 1960.

== Economics career ==
From 1960 to 1969 Jones taught finance, first at Northwestern University and then at the University of Michigan. In 1968 he was promoted to full professor, becoming at 35 the youngest full professor in the history of the University of Michigan.

In 1969 Paul W. McCracken, chairman of President Richard Nixon's Council of Economic Advisers and a former colleague at the University of Michigan, recruited Jones as an aide to the Council. For the next 24 years he moved in and out of government, serving a number of senior economic policy roles and taking research and teaching appointments in between these stints. Most notably, he was Assistant Secretary of Commerce for Economic Affairs in the Nixon administration; Under Secretary of Commerce for Economic Affairs in the Reagan administration; and twice Assistant Secretary of the Treasury for Economic Policy, in the Ford and George H. W. Bush administrations.

In a 1984 interview he described himself as more a teacher of economics than an original researcher. He also said his time in government made him a more knowledgeable teacher.

=== List of positions ===
This list is drawn from biographical information on Jones from the Gerald R. Ford Presidential Library and Museum and the record of the Senate confirmation hearing for his second term as Assistant Treasury Secretary. Throughout his career he also had occasional, brief visiting appointments at schools including Dartmouth College, Rice University, Carleton College, and Cornell University.

- 1956–60: Assistant and then associate professor of finance, Northwestern University
- 1965–69: Associate and then full professor of finance, University of Michigan
- 1969–71: Senior Economist and Special Assistant to the Chairman, Council of Economic Advisers
- 1971–72: Professor of finance, University of Michigan
- 1972–73: Minister-Counselor for Economic Affairs, U.S. Mission to NATO
- 1973–74: Assistant Secretary of Commerce for Economic Affairs, United States Department of Commerce
- 1974–75: Deputy Assistant to the President and Deputy to the Counsellor for Economic Policy, the White House
- 1975–77: Assistant Secretary of the Treasury for Economic Policy, United States Department of the Treasury
- 1977–78: Fellow, Woodrow Wilson International Center for Scholars, Smithsonian Institution
- 1978: Assistant to the Board of Governors of the Federal Reserve System
- 1978–82: Lecturer, Georgetown University
- 1978–83: Research Scholar, American Enterprise Institute
- 1982–83: Consultant, U.S. Agency for International Development
- 1983–85: Under Secretary of Commerce for Economic Affairs
- 1985–86: Fellow, Woodrow Wilson International Center for Scholars, Smithsonian Institution
- 1986–89: Associate Faculty, Center for Public Policy Education, Brookings Institution
- 1986–89: Visiting Professor, Georgetown University
- 1988: Member, Economic Policy Advisers Group, Presidential campaign of George H. W. Bush
- 1989–93: Assistant Secretary of the Treasury for Economic Policy

For a time after his appointment as Under Secretary of Commerce for Economic Affairs, he was a senior adviser to the Government Research Corporation.

== Policy views ==
Jones is a Republican. He has described himself as an "eclectic monetarist." In 1977, he identified inflation as the primary threat to prosperity and argued against the existence of a tradeoff between inflation and unemployment. In 1984, as Under Secretary of Commerce for Economic Affairs, he favored reducing inflation by lowering federal spending, instituting a consumption tax, and reducing income tax exemptions, rather than increasing marginal income tax rates.

In 1983, two of Ronald Reagan's most senior aides disagreed over how to reduce the federal budget deficit in fiscal year 1985. Council of Economic Advisers chairman Martin Feldstein wanted to raise taxes, while Treasury Secretary Donald Regan wanted to reduce spending. Jones sided with Regan, and in the end so did Reagan.

Republican and Democratic economists praised Jones's work as an economist and described him as within the mainstream of contemporary economic thought. Democrat Jimmy Carter defeated Ford in the 1976 election, so in early 1977 Jones was preparing to leave government. He praised Carter's choices for economic advisers, including Charles Schultze, W. Michael Blumenthal, and Bert Lance, despite disagreeing with many of their policy views. During the 1989 Senate confirmation hearing for Jones's second tenure as Assistant Secretary of the Treasury, he won praise from Republican Senators John Chafee and Bob Packwood as well as Democratic Senators Lloyd Bentsen and David Pryor.
