= William Brainard =

American economist

William C. Brainard
- Born: c. 1935 (age 90–91)

Academic background
- Education: Yale University (MA, PhD)
- Doctoral advisor: James Tobin

Academic work
- Institutions: Yale University

William C. "Bill" Brainard (born c. 1935) is an American economist. He is the Arthur Okun Professor Emeritus of Economics at Yale University, and he served as the provost of the university from 1981 to 1986. Brainard is the namesake of the William C. Brainard chair, which current Yale provost Ben Polak holds. Brainard earned both his economics M.A. (1959) and Ph.D. (1963) at Yale. He has been teaching at Yale since 1962.

Along with his frequent collaborator James Tobin, Brainard developed the theory of Tobin's q. The concept first appeared in Brainard and Tobin's 1968 article "Pitfalls in Financial Model Building" The letter "Q," however, was not introduced until Tobin's 1969 article "A general equilibrium approach to monetary theory." So, while references to "Q theory" generally carry only Tobin's name, Brainard and Tobin jointly introduced the concept. Brainard was co-editor with George Perry of the Brookings Papers on Economic Activity from 1980 through 2007, and continues to serve on its advisory panel. Brainard's fields of interest are: Microeconomics, microeconomics and macroeconomic theory, monetary theory and policy, market valuation of firms, and models of financial markets.
