= Alicia Munnell =

American economist

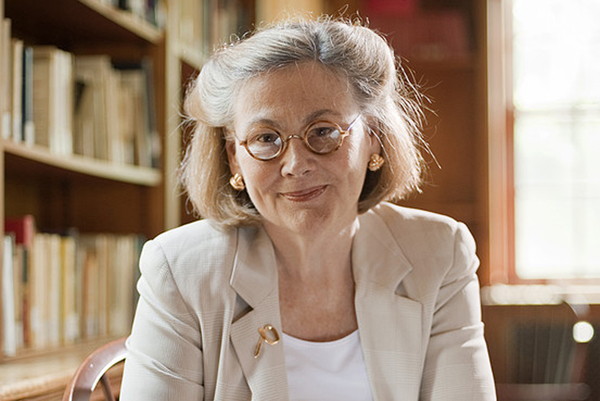

Assistant Secretary of the Treasury for Economic Policy
- In office January 20, 1993 – December 22, 1995; Acting: January 20, 1993 – May 20, 1993
- President: Bill Clinton
- Preceded by: Sidney L. Jones
- Succeeded by: Joshua Gotbaum

Personal details
- Born: December 6, 1942 (age 82) New York City, U.S.
- Political party: Democratic
- Education: Wellesley College (BA); Boston University (MA); Harvard University (PhD)

Alicia Haydock Munnell (born December 6, 1942) is an American economist who was the Peter F. Drucker Professor of Management Sciences at Boston College's Carroll School of Management from 1997-2024. Educated at Wellesley College, Boston University, and Harvard University, Munnell spent 20 years as an economist at the Federal Reserve Bank of Boston, where she researched wealth, savings, and retirement among American workers. She served in the Bill Clinton administration as Assistant Secretary of the Treasury for Economic Policy and as a member of the Council of Economic Advisers. She founded the Center for Retirement Research at Boston College in 1998 and served as its director until she stepped down at the end of 2024.

== Early life and education ==
Alicia Haydock Munnell was born December 6, 1942, in New York City. In 1964 she received a B.A. in economics from Wellesley College, where she was a member of Phi Beta Kappa. She received an M.A. in economics from Boston University in 1966 and a Ph.D. in economics from Harvard University in 1973. At Harvard she studied public and private retirement savings plans.

== Career ==
Munnell held a number of short-term positions before earning her doctorate. She was a teaching fellow in the economics departments of Boston University from 1965 to 1966 and Harvard University from 1971 to 1973. From 1964 to 1965 she was a staff assistant in the Business Research Division of the New England Telephone Company. From 1966 to 1968 she was a research assistant to Joseph A. Pechman, then director of the Economic Studies Program at the Brookings Institution. She also had an appointment as assistant professor of economics at Wellesley in 1974.

=== Federal Reserve Bank of Boston ===
After earning her Ph.D. in 1973, Munnell began a 20-year career at the Federal Reserve Bank of Boston. She was a research economist and was promoted to senior vice president and director of research in 1984. Her research focused primarily on the distribution of wealth and savings in the American population and the impact of retirement policies and plans. She advocated taxing benefits and contributions to private pension plans, which she viewed as providing tax breaks for the well off without increasing their saving. In 1992 she published a study that claimed Boston-area banks had practiced racial discrimination in mortgage lending against black and Hispanic applicants. The American Bankers Association and political conservatives criticized the study.

=== Clinton administration ===
In December 1992, President-elect Bill Clinton held an economic forum in Little Rock, Arkansas, which Munnell attended. Clinton responded favorably to several of Munnell's policy proposals. By January 20, 1993, when Clinton was inaugurated, Munnell was seen as the likely choice for the post of Assistant Secretary of the Treasury for Economic Policy. Three days later, Clinton's Treasury Secretary, Lloyd Bentsen, announced her appointment to the post in an acting capacity. To formally hold the post, Munnell needed to be confirmed by the U.S. Senate. Several Republican Senators reacted negatively to the nomination, citing her views on taxing pensions. The pension industry also criticized the nomination. Nonetheless, she had the support of some Republican Senators, including David Durenberger, the ranking member of the Finance Committee, and her confirmation hearing before that committee in May 1993 was uncontroversial. She was confirmed later that month by a voice vote following floor debate in which several Republicans reiterated objections to the pension tax proposal.

As Assistant Secretary, Munnell's main role was as the chief aide to the Treasury Secretary on economic issues. However, as a senior official in the Treasury Department she worked in a number of other areas, including investment policy for private pension plans, the administration's response to the Federal Reserve's moves against inflation, and Superfund reform. Now, she argues that the best way to fix the social security funding dilemma is to raise taxes.

By February 1994, speculation had begun that Munnell could be named to the Federal Reserve Board of Governors. In May 1995, when John P. LaWare announced his retirement from the Fed Board, the Clinton administration announced its intention to appoint Munnell to fill the vacancy. However, the November 1994 election had given Republicans control of the Senate, and a group of 10 Republican Senators told the administration they would oppose her over concerns that she would not fight inflation hard enough. Her views on pensions and the mortgage discrimination study she led were also cited as reasons the lending industry pressured Republicans to oppose her. In June the administration decided to avoid a confirmation fight by naming her instead to the President's Council of Economic Advisers. The Fed Board seat remained vacant until June 1996, when the Senate confirmed Lawrence Meyer to replace LaWare.

The Washington Post reported in December 1996 that Clinton would name Munnell to head the Social Security Administration during his second term, but this did not come to pass. She left the Council of Economic Advisers in August 1997, ending her service in the Clinton administration.

=== Boston College ===
After resigning from the Council of Economic Advisers in 1997, Munnell joined the faculty of Boston College as the Peter F. Drucker Professor of Management Sciences at the Carroll School of Management. She founded BC's Center for Retirement Research the following year.

Munnell was named a Fellow of the American Academy of Arts and Sciences in 1998. Alicia Munnell co-founded and became the first president of the National Academy of Social Insurance. She was the 2009 recipient of the National Academy of Social Insurance's Robert M. Ball Award for Outstanding Achievements in Social Insurance. In 2015, she chaired the U.S. Social Security Advisory Board’s Technical Panel on Assumptions and Methods. Currently, she is a member of the American Academy of Arts and Sciences and the National Academy of Medicine. She is a member of the board of the National Bureau of Economic Research and the Pension Rights Center.

== Personal life ==
Munnell was first married to Thomas Clark Munnell, with whom she had two sons. They divorced, and Alicia Munnell later married Henry S. Healy. She is a member of the Democratic Party.
