= Murray Weidenbaum =

American economist and author

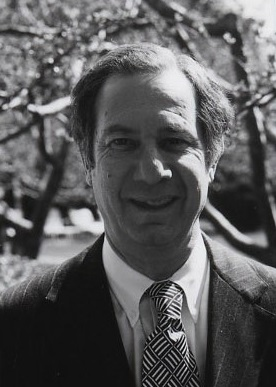

12th Chair of the Council of Economic Advisers
- In office February 27, 1981 – August 25, 1982
- President: Ronald Reagan
- Preceded by: Charles Schultze
- Succeeded by: Marty Feldstein

Assistant Secretary of the Treasury for Economic Policy
- In office June 23, 1969 – August 13, 1971
- President: Richard Nixon
- Preceded by: Position established
- Succeeded by: Edgar Fiedler

Personal details
- Born: February 10, 1927 New York City, New York, U.S.
- Died: March 20, 2014 (aged 87) Clayton, Missouri, U.S.
- Party: Republican
- Spouse: Phyllis Green
- Children: 3
- Education: City University of New York, City College (BBA); Columbia University (MA); Princeton University (PhD)

Murray Lew Weidenbaum (February 10, 1927 – March 20, 2014), was an American economist and author. He was the Edward Mallinckrodt Distinguished University Professor and Honorary Chairman of the Murray Weidenbaum Center on the Economy, Government, and Public Policy at Washington University in St. Louis. He served as the first Assistant Secretary of the Treasury for Economic Policy from 1969 to 1971, and he was chairman of President Ronald Reagan's first Council of Economic Advisors from 1981 to 1982.

== Biography ==
Weidenbaum was born to a Jewish family in the Bronx. He received a BBA from City College of New York, an M.A. from Columbia University, and a Ph.D. from Princeton University with thesis titled Government Spending: Process and Measurement. He became a faculty member at Washington University in St. Louis in 1964 and was chair of the economics department from 1966 to 1969. In 1975 he helped found the Center for the Study of American Business at Washington University, which was later renamed the Weidenbaum Center in his honor.

Weidenbaum did extensive research on the role of the Overseas Chinese bamboo network in Southeast Asia. He explores the topic in his book The Bamboo Network: How Expatriate Chinese Entrepreneurs are Creating a New Economic Superpower in Asia.

Weidenbaum died on March 29, 2014, at his home in Clayton, Missouri, at 87.

Political offices
| New office | Assistant Secretary of the Treasury for Economic Policy; 1969–1971 | Succeeded by Edgar Fiedler |
| Preceded by Charles Schultze | Chair of the Council of Economic Advisers; 1981–1982 | Succeeded by Marty Feldstein |
