= Karen Dynan =

American economist

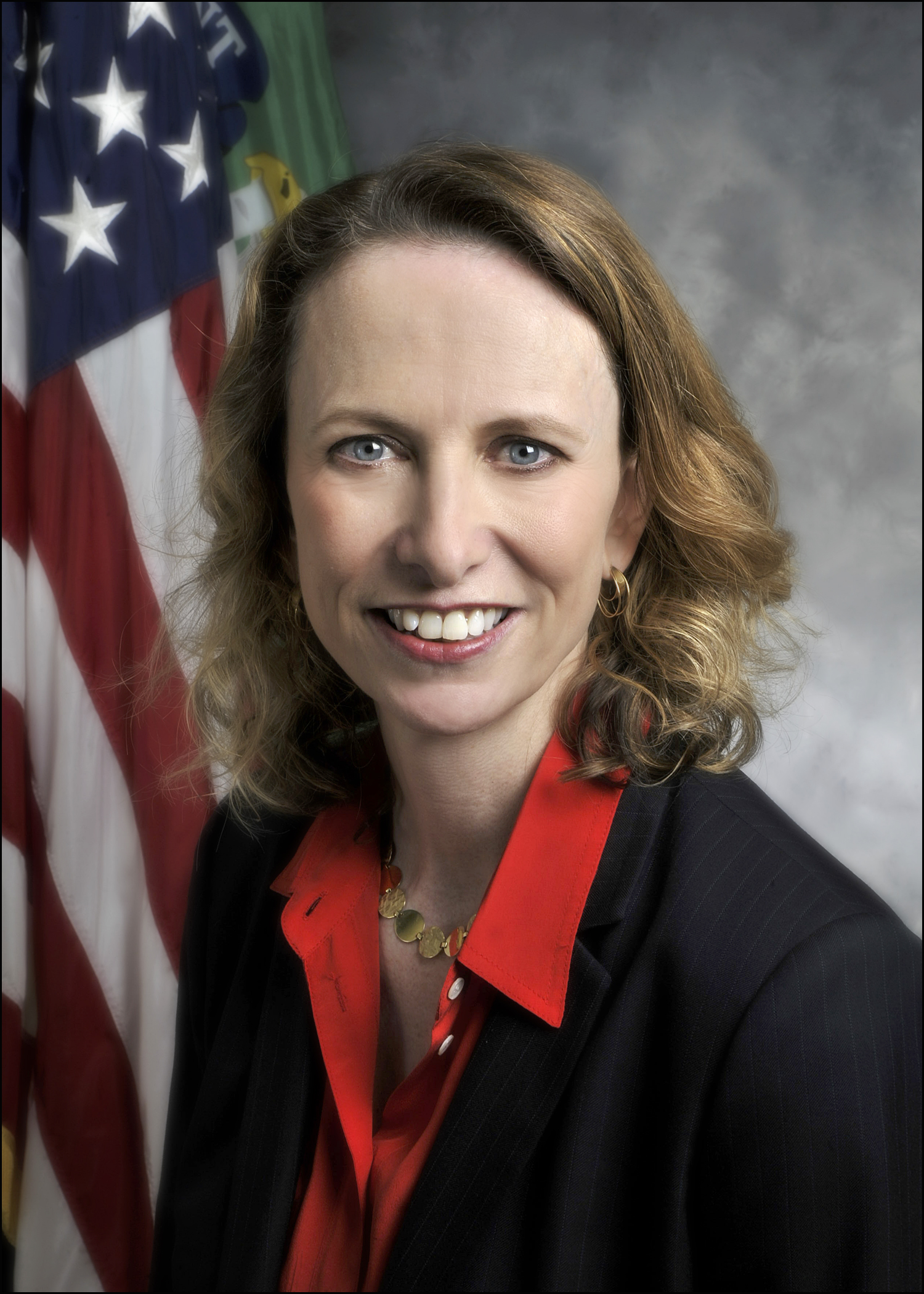

Assistant Secretary of the Treasury for Economic Policy
- In office June 26, 2014 – January 20, 2017
- President: Barack Obama
- Preceded by: Janice Eberly
- Succeeded by: Michael Faulkender (2019)

Personal details
- Party: Democratic
- Spouse: Douglas Elmendorf
- Children: 2
- Education: Brown University (BA); Harvard University (MA, PhD)
- Scientific career
- Fields: Macroeconomic policy
- Workplaces: Harvard University; Brookings Institution; Federal Reserve Board
- Doctoral advisor: Greg Mankiw

Karen Dynan is an American economist who is Professor of the Practice of Economics at Harvard University and a Non-resident Senior Fellow at the Peterson Institute for International Economics. She previously served as the Assistant Secretary of the Treasury for Economic Policy and Chief Economist of the United States Department of the Treasury, having been nominated to that position by President Barack Obama in August 2013 and confirmed by the U.S. Senate in June 2014. From 2009 to 2013, Dr. Dynan was the Vice President and co-director of the Economic Studies program at the Brookings Institution. Prior to joining Brookings, she served on the staff of the Federal Reserve Board for 17 years. Dr. Dynan is an expert on macroeconomic policy, consumer behavior, household finance, and housing policy.

== Early life and education ==
Dynan grew up in Greenwich, Connecticut. Her father served in the army during World War II and started his own business in the 1970s. She attended Brown University, graduating in 1985 with an A.B. in applied mathematics and economics. After graduating from Brown, she worked at the Federal Reserve Board of Governors in Washington D.C. as a research assistant.

Dynan went on to pursue graduate studies in economics at Harvard University, graduating with a Ph.D. in economics in 1992. While at Harvard, her focus was in macroeconomics and econometrics. Her dissertation adviser was Greg Mankiw.

== Career ==
After earning her Ph.D., Dynan joined the Macroeconomic Analysis Section of the Federal Reserve Board. She remained at the Federal Reserve for 17 years, serving in a variety of senior positions. In 1998, she had a visiting appointment at Johns Hopkins University. From 2003 to 2004, Dynan served as a Senior Economist on the staff of the Council of Economic Advisers when Greg Mankiw was chairman. In 2009, she left the Federal Reserve to become vice president for Economic Studies at the Brookings Institution. In 2013, she was named Robert S. Kerr Senior Fellow at Brookings.

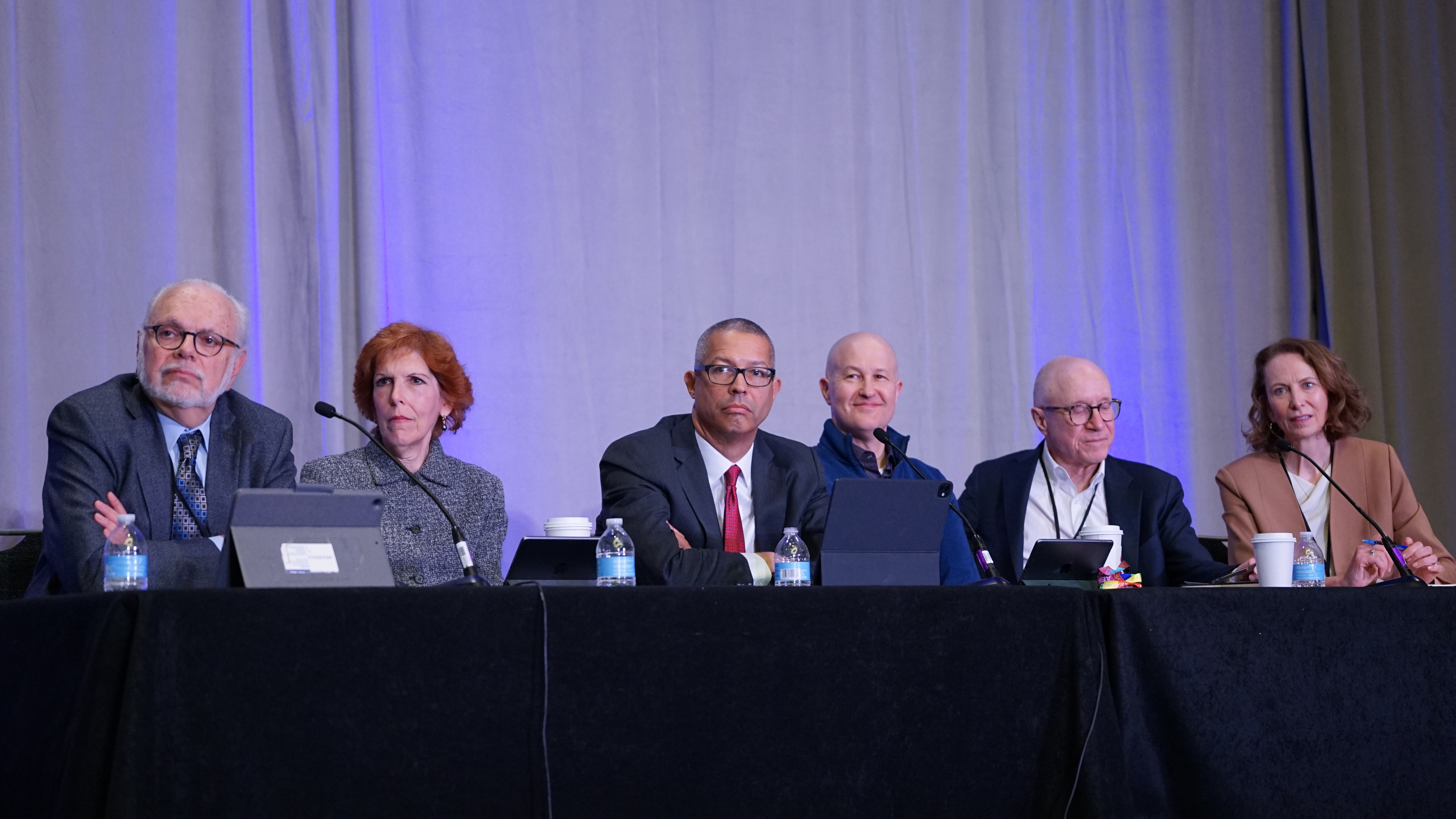
David Wessel, Loretta Mester, Seth Carpenter, Jed Kolko, William Beach, Dynan at ASSA 2026

In August 2013, Dynan was nominated by President Obama to serve as Assistant Secretary of the Treasury for Economic Policy and Chief Economist of the United States Department of the Treasury. She was confirmed by the U.S. Senate in June 2014. In this role, she advised the Secretary of the Treasury on current and prospective economic developments in the U.S. and assisted in the determination of appropriate economic policies in areas ranging from housing to education.

Dynan chaired the Board of Overseers of the Panel Study of Income Dynamics and served on the Bureau of Economic Analysis Advisory Committee, the U.S. Financial Diaries Advisory Board, and the American Economic Association Committee on Economic Statistics.

== Research ==
Dynan's research focuses on consumer spending and saving decisions, household debt and deleveraging, household financial security, foreclosure prevention, and the effects of financial innovation on economic dynamics. Her papers have been published in top economics journals, including the American Economic Review, Journal of Political Economy, Journal of Economic Perspectives, and Journal of Monetary Economics.

== Personal ==
Dynan is married to Douglas Elmendorf, dean and Don K. Price Professor of Public Policy at Harvard Kennedy School, and former director of the Congressional Budget Office. They live in Cambridge, Massachusetts, with their twin daughters.
