= Assistant Secretary of the Treasury for Economic Policy =

Official in the U.S. Treasury Department

- Flag of an Assistant Secretary of the Treasury
- Incumbent; Samuel Brown (Acting) since March 30, 2023
- Department of the Treasury
- Style: The Honorable
- Reports to: Secretary of the Treasury; Deputy Secretary of the Treasury
- Nominator: President of the United States
- Salary: $155,500 (2010)
- Website: Official website

The assistant secretary of the treasury for economic policy is the head of the Office of Economic Policy in the United States Department of the Treasury. The position is held by Ben Harris. President Joe Biden announced he would nominate Ben Harris to the role on March 11, 2021. Harris was confirmed by the Senate on November 3, 2021, and sworn in on November 15, 2021

According to U.S. statute, there are ten assistant secretaries of the treasury appointed by the president of the United States with the advice and consent of the United States Senate. The assistant secretary of the treasury for economic policy reports directly to the United States secretary of the treasury and the United States deputy secretary of the treasury.

== List of Assistant Secretaries of the Treasury for Economic Policy ==
| Name | Assumed office | Left office | President | Treasury Secretary |
|---|---|---|---|---|
| Murray Weidenbaum | June 23, 1969 | August 13, 1971 | Richard Nixon | David M. Kennedy, John Connally |
| Edgar Fiedler | December 12, 1971 | July 16, 1975 | Richard Nixon, Gerald Ford | John Connally, George P. Shultz, William E. Simon |
| Sidney L. Jones | July 17, 1975 | January 20, 1977 | Gerald Ford | William E. Simon |
| Daniel H. Brill | May 16, 1977 | September 30, 1979 | Jimmy Carter | W. Michael Blumenthal, G. William Miller |
| Curtis A. Hessler | April 4, 1980 | January 20, 1981 | Jimmy Carter | G. William Miller |
| Paul Craig Roberts | March 13, 1981 | February 1, 1982 | Ronald Reagan | Donald Regan |
| Manuel H. Johnson | December 10, 1982 | February 7, 1986 | Ronald Reagan | Donald Regan, James Baker |
| Michael R. Darby | July 14, 1986 | May 22, 1989 | Ronald Reagan, George H. W. Bush | James Baker, Nicholas F. Brady |
| Sidney L. Jones | October 31, 1989 | January 11, 1993 | George H. W. Bush | Nicholas F. Brady |
| Alicia Munnell | May 20, 1993 | December 22, 1995 | Bill Clinton | Lloyd Bentsen, Robert Rubin |
| Joshua Gotbaum | December 1995 | 1997 | Bill Clinton | Robert Rubin |
| David W. Wilcox | November 6, 1997 | January 19, 2001 | Bill Clinton | Robert Rubin |
| Richard Clarida | February 7, 2002 | May 16, 2003 | George W. Bush | Paul O'Neill, John W. Snow |
| Mark J. Warshawsky | March 18, 2004 | July 28, 2006 | George W. Bush | John W. Snow |
| Phillip Swagel | December 11, 2006 | January 9, 2009 | George W. Bush | Henry Paulson |
| Alan Krueger | May 7, 2009 | November 4, 2010 | Barack Obama | Timothy Geithner |
| John Bellows (Acting) | November 2010 | September 2011 | Barack Obama | Timothy Geithner |
| Janice Eberly | October 21, 2011 | April 26, 2013 | Barack Obama | Timothy Geithner, Jack Lew |
| Karen Dynan | June 26, 2014 | January 20, 2017 | Barack Obama | Jack Lew |
| Michael Faulkender | August 6, 2019 | January 20, 2021 | Donald Trump | Steve Mnuchin |
| Ben Harris | November 15, 2021 | March 30, 2023 | Joe Biden | Janet Yellen |
| Samuel Brown (Acting) | March 30, 2023 | Incumbent | Joe Biden; Donald Trump | Janet Yellen; Scott Bessent |

== See also ==
- Assistant Secretary of the Treasury
