= Kenneth Roth =

American human rights activist (born 1955)

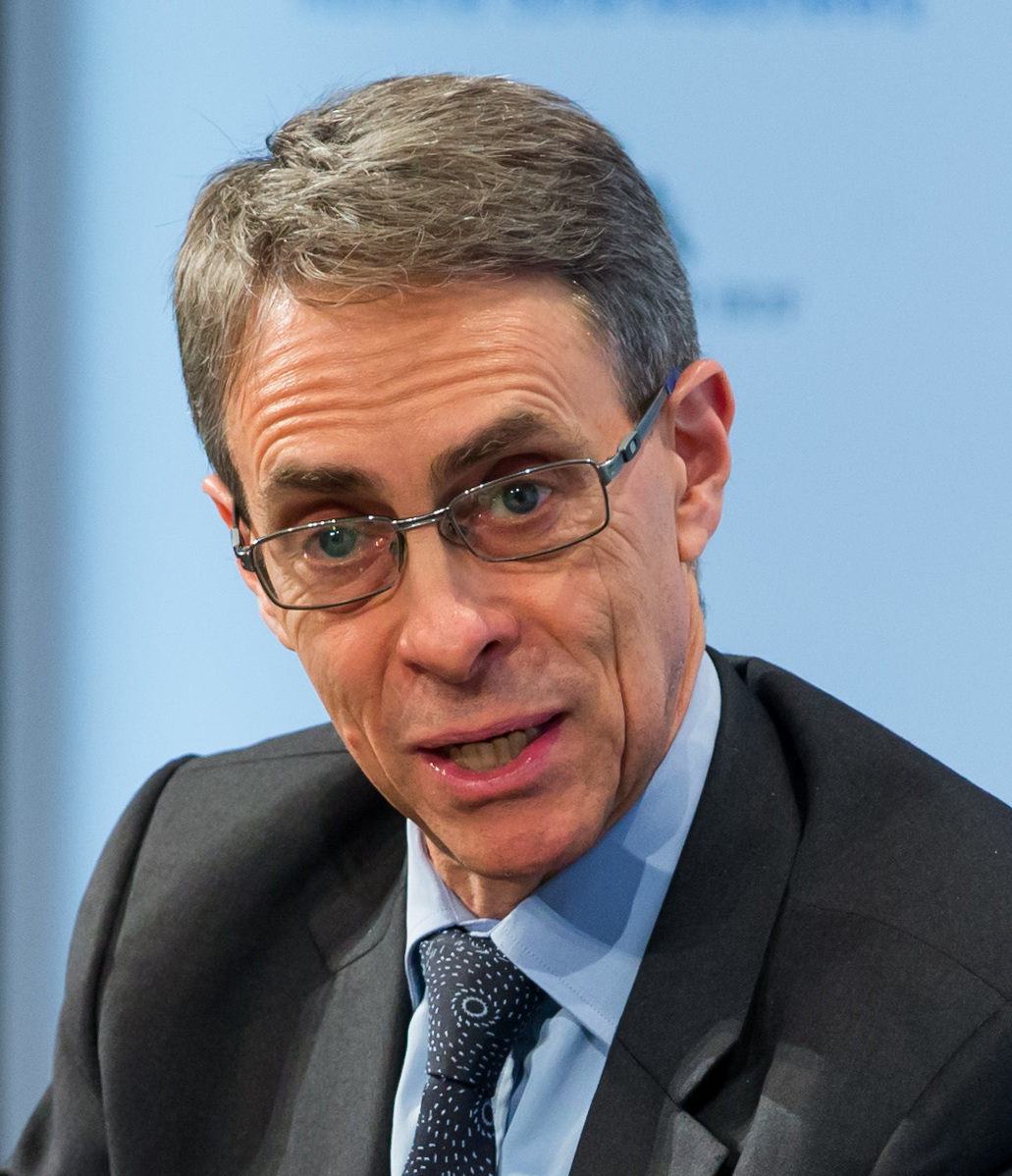
- Roth in 2018
- Born: September 23, 1955 (age 71); Elmhurst, Illinois, U.S.
- Education: Brown University (BA); Yale University (JD)
- Known for: Executive director of Human Rights Watch
- Spouse: Annie Sparrow (m. 2011)

Kenneth Roth (born September 23, 1955) is an American attorney, human rights activist, and writer. He was the executive director of Human Rights Watch (HRW) from 1993 to 2022.

== Early life and education ==
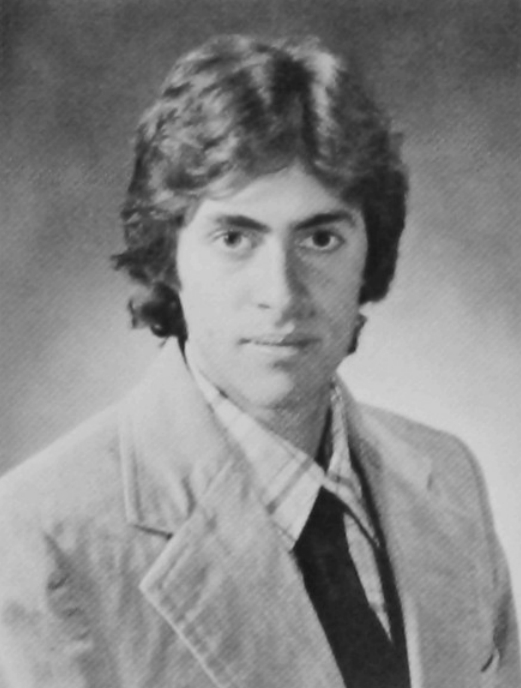
Roth in the Brown University yearbook, 1977

Kenneth Roth was born on September 23, 1955, in Elmhurst, Illinois, to Muriel T. Roth and Walter S. Roth. His father was a Jewish refugee who fled Nazi Germany. Walter's family had a butchery in Germany near Frankfurt when Adolf Hitler came to power.

Kenneth Roth grew up in Deerfield, Illinois. He graduated from Brown University in 1977 with a BA in history and received his Juris Doctor from Yale Law School in 1980.

On June 13, 2011, Roth was married in an Anglican church to Annie Sparrow.

== Career ==
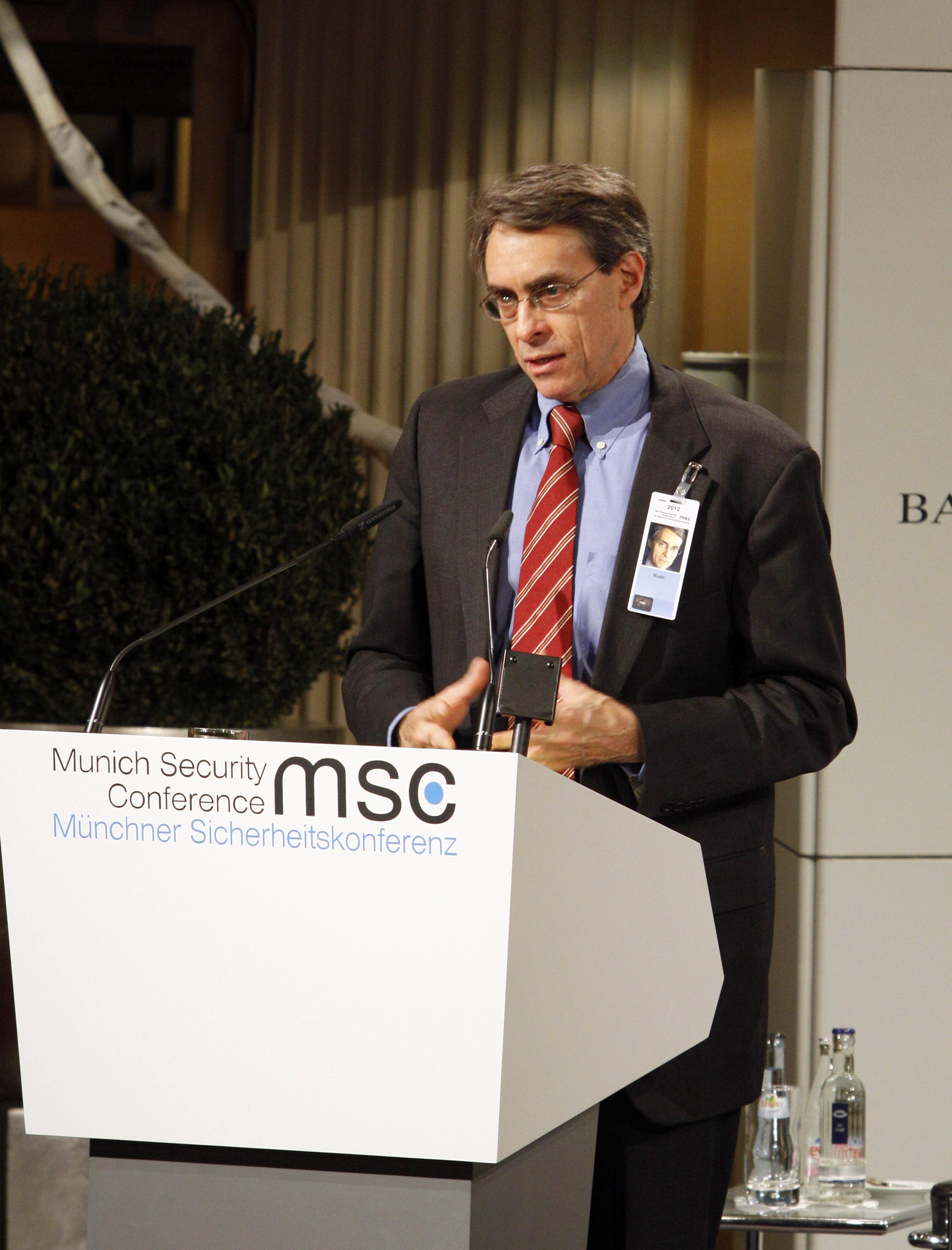
Roth in 2012

Roth worked in private practice as a litigator and served as an Assistant United States Attorney for the United States Department of Justice for the Southern District of New York and the Iran-Contra investigation in Washington DC. Roth's career in human rights began inauspiciously. The one human rights course offered at Yale Law School was repeatedly canceled, and upon graduation he found that jobs in the field were few. As a result, as he worked as a lawyer, and volunteered nights and weekends doing human rights work, focusing on the Soviet imposition of martial law in Poland in 1981.

Roth joined Human Rights Watch (HRW) in 1987 as deputy director. His initial work centered on Haiti and gradually extended to Cuba and the Middle East, among other places.

Since 1993 (when Aryeh Neier left to become head of George Soros's Open Society Institute), Roth became the executive director of HRW. While he was in the office, the HRW staff increased from 60 to 552; HRW shared the Nobel Peace Prize in 1997 for banning of anti-personnel mines, helped to establish International Criminal Court and ban children in the military. Roth resigned from HRW on 31 August 2022. After leaving HRW, Roth said he intended to write a book.

Roth received honorary degrees from Brown University, Bowdoin College, the University of Ottawa, and the American University of Paris. He was a recipient of the Athens Democracy Award, the William Rogers Award from Brown University and the Jean Mayer Global Citizenship Award from Tufts University. He serves on the Watson Institute Board of Overseers at Brown University, the Board of Governors of Bard College Berlin, and the Humanitarian and Development Advisory Panel of the Novo Nordisk Foundation.

== Harvard Kennedy School fellowship ==
In 2021, Roth was offered a fellowship at the Harvard Kennedy School's Carr Center for Human Rights Policy. The offer was withdrawn in 2023. Roth said that the withdrawal was because of his criticism of Israel. Michael Massing reported Roth's claims in the Nation. Roth told the Guardian and Amy Goodman on Democracy Now that he believed Harvard Kennedy School dean Douglas Elmendorf had capitulated to Harvard's donors who are strong supporters of Israel. Kennedy school professor Kathryn Sikkink said she was told that Elmendorf thought Human Rights Watch has an "anti-Israel bias" and that Roth’s tweets on Israel were concerning, points she disputed with the dean. Following Roth's complaint, the ACLU, Pen America, and other human rights activists condemned the Kennedy School's decision. On January 10, 2023, HRW published a letter to Harvard President Lawrence Bacow that said it was concerned about a "lasting impact on scholars and activists, particularly Palestinians, who should not have to fear professional repercussions from Harvard University or another institution if they write or speak critically about the Israeli government". Following those reports, hundreds of Harvard affiliates called on Elmendorf to resign.

On January 19, 2023, The Kennedy School, which denies Roth's allegations, reversed its decision, reoffering Roth the fellowship. Elmendorf said that his initial decision had been in "error" and was not intended "to limit debate at the Kennedy School about human rights in any country". Roth responded that Elmendorf failed to say anything to identify the people "who matter to him" who he said were behind his original veto decision. "Full transparency is key to ensuring that such influence is not exerted in other cases", Roth said, adding: "Secondly, I remain worried about academic freedom. Given my three decades leading Human Rights Watch, I was able to shine an intense spotlight on Dean Elmendorf’s decision, but what about others? The problem of people penalized for criticizing Israel is not limited to me."

In the fall of 2023, Roth joined the Princeton School of Public and International Affairs as a lecturer and the Charles and Marie Robertson Visiting Professor.

== Denial of entry to Egypt and China ==
In 2014, the Egyptian government blocked Roth from entering the country. He was traveling to Egypt to release a report on its government's August 2013 Rabaa massacre of 817 sit-in protesters.

In December 2019, China announced unspecified sanctions against HRW and several other NGOs because of links to the Hong Kong democracy movement. In January 2020, Roth said that he was denied entry to Hong Kong. He was planning to launch the organization's World Report, which had an essay saying China is a growing threat to human rights around the world. Geng Shuang, a spokesman for China's foreign ministry, told reporters he would not read the report, accusing Human Rights Watch of distorting the truth and claiming China's human rights situation is “the best it's been in history.” In August 2020, the Chinese government announced that it had imposed unspecified “sanctions” on Roth.
