= Judith K. Hellerstein =

American economist

Judith Hellerstein
- Education: Brown University; Harvard University
- Spouse: Phillip Swagel
- Children: 3
- Scientific career
- Fields: Economics
- Workplaces: Northwestern University; University of Maryland
- Doctoral advisor: Lawrence F. Katz
- Website: Official website

Judith K. Hellerstein was the Chair of the Economics department between 2019 and 2022 and is currently a professor of economics at the University of Maryland. She is a former co-editor of The Journal of Human Resources, a Research Associate of the National Bureau of Economic Research, and she chairs the Technical Review Committee for the National Longitudinal Surveys. She served as Chief Economist of the Council of Economic Advisers during 2011–2012.

Hellerstein testified in 2013 before the Montgomery County Council on the employment impacts of potential changes to the minimum wage.

== Research ==
Her publications have focused on wage determination, labor market outcomes by race, gender and ethnicity, and workplace segregation. With David Neumark and Melissa McInerney she showed that the spatial composition of jobs plays a relatively minor role in explaining low employment rates for Black men. In work with Melinda Morrill, she found that divorce rates fall when unemployment is high.

=== Selected works ===
- Spatial Mismatch or Racial Mismatch?"Journal of Urban Economics (2008)
- "Dads and Daughters: The Changing Impact of Fathers on Women's Occupational Choices," Journal of Human Resources (2011)
- The Importance of Residential Labor Market Networks,"Journal of Labor Economics (2011)
- Hellerstein, Judith K., David Neumark, and Kenneth R. Troske. "Wages, productivity, and worker characteristics: Evidence from plant-level production functions and wage equations." Journal of labor economics 17, no. 3 (1999): 409–446.
- Bayard, Kimberly, Judith Hellerstein, David Neumark, and Kenneth Troske. "New evidence on sex segregation and sex differences in wages from matched employee-employer data." Journal of labor Economics 21, no. 4 (2003): 887–922.
- Hellerstein, Judith K. "The importance of the physician in the generic versus trade-name prescription decision." The Rand journal of economics (1998): 108–136.
- Hellerstein, Judith K., David Neumark, and Kenneth R. Troske. Market forces and sex discrimination. Journal of Human Resources 37 (2), 353–380
- Hellerstein, Judith K., and David Neumark. "Workplace segregation in the United States: Race, ethnicity, and skill." The review of economics and statistics 90.3 (2008): 459–477.
