= James H. Stock =

American economist

- Born: 24 December 1955 (age 70); Munich

Academic background
- Education: University of California-Berkeley; Yale University
- Doctoral advisor: Thomas J. Rothenberg
- Influences: Clive Granger

Academic work
- Discipline: Econometrics
- Institutions: Harvard University
- Doctoral students: Anna Mikusheva
- Website: Information at IDEAS / RePEc

James Harold Stock (born December 24, 1955) is an American economist, professor of economics, and vice provost for climate and sustainability at Harvard University. He is the co-author of Introduction to Econometrics, a leading undergraduate textbook, and the co-editor of the Brookings Papers on Economic Activity. Stock served as a Chair of the Harvard Economics Department from 2007 to 2009 and was a member of President Obama's Council of Economic Advisers from 2013 to 2014.

== Academic career ==
Stock graduated with a B.S. in physics from Yale University in 1978. He then went to the University of California-Berkeley, where he completed his M.S. in Statistics in 1982 and Ph.D. in Economics in 1983.

== Research ==
His research areas include macroeconomic forecasting, monetary policy, and econometric methods for the analysis of economic time series data. His work includes an examination of the recent evolution of the US business cycle and the impact of changes in monetary policy on that evolution. He is a member of various professional boards, including the NBER's Business Cycle Dating Committee and the Academic Advisory Board of the Federal Reserve Bank of Boston.

== Books ==
Stock has published the following books:

- Introduction to Econometrics. Addison Wesley Longman (2003, 2007) (with Mark W. Watson).
- Introduction to Econometrics: Brief Edition. Addison Wesley Longman (2007) (with Mark W. Watson).
