= Edgar Fiedler =

American economist

Edgar Russell Fiedler

Assistant Secretary of the Treasury for Economic Policy
- In office 1971–1975
- President: Richard Nixon, Gerald Ford
- Preceded by: Murray Weidenbaum
- Succeeded by: Sidney L. Jones

Personal details
- Born: April 21, 1929 Milwaukee, Wisconsin
- Died: March 15, 2003 (aged 73)
- Occupation: economist

Edgar Russell Fiedler (April 21, 1929 – March 15, 2003) was an American economist.

== Biography ==
Fiedler was born in Milwaukee, Wisconsin, and later lived in Scarsdale, New York, and Chapel Hill, North Carolina. He was a 1951 graduate of the University of Wisconsin. He received an M.B.A. at the University of Michigan in 1956, and a Ph.D. in economics from New York University in 1970.

He served as Assistant Secretary of the Treasury for Economic Policy from 1971 to 1975 during the presidencies of Richard Nixon and Gerald Ford.

He served as vice president, economic counselor, senior fellow and adviser of The Conference Board, a business research organization in Manhattan, which he first joined in 1975. He edited its monthly publication, Economic Times.

In the 1980s he was an adjunct professor of economics at the Columbia Graduate School of Business. He authored The Roots of Stagflation (1984).

He wrote the following wry rules for economic forecasters: “If you must forecast, forecast often. And if you’re ever right, never let ’em forget it.”
