= Ben Harris (economist) =

American economist (born 1977)

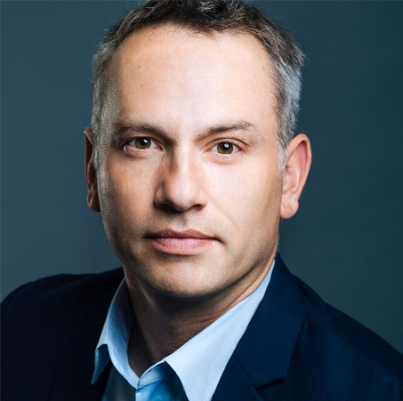

Assistant Secretary of the Treasury for Economic Policy
- In office November 15, 2021 – March 30, 2023
- President: Joe Biden
- Preceded by: Michael Faulkender
- Succeeded by: S. P. Kothari (2026)

Personal details
- Party: Democratic
- Spouse: Jessica Lynn
- Education: Tufts University (BA); Columbia University (MA); Cornell University (MA); George Washington University (MPhil, PhD)

Benjamin H. Harris is an American economist who is currently the Vice President and Director of the Economic Studies program at the Brookings Institution. Throughout his career, he has served in several public-service positions, most notably as the chief economist and chief economic advisor to Vice President Joe Biden from 2014 until the end of the Obama administration, and as Assistant Secretary for Economic Policy and Chief Economist of the U.S. Treasury. Harris was the executive director of the Kellogg Public-Private Initiative at the Kellogg School of Management at Northwestern University, the Chief Economist to the evidence-based policy organization Results for America, and the founder of the economic policy consulting firm Cherrydale Strategies.

Harris remained a close adviser to Joe Biden following the end of the Obama administration, serving as the chief editor of the Biden Forum and as the economic adviser to the former vice president throughout his 2020 presidential campaign.

== Early life and education ==
Harris is a native of Washington state, and was raised primarily on Bainbridge Island. He graduated from Bainbridge High School in 1995.

He holds a Ph.D. in economics from George Washington University, which he earned in 2011, in addition to three master's degrees: an M.Phil. in economics from George Washington University in 2010, an M.A. in economics from Cornell University in 2005, and an M.A. in quantitative methods from Columbia University in 2003.

Harris earned his B.A. in economics from Tufts University in 1999. He was awarded a Fulbright Scholarship to Namibia in 2000.

== Career ==
One of the earliest roles for Harris was as a senior economist with the Budget Committee in the U.S. House of Representatives. He went on to serve as a research economist at the Brookings Institution, and later as the policy director of The Hamilton Project, a fellow in Economic Studies at the Brookings Institution, and deputy director of the Retirement Security Project at Brookings.

Between 2011 and 2013, Harris worked at the White House as a senior economist with the Council of Economic Advisers, where he specialized in fiscal policy and retirement security. After leaving his first stint with the Obama administration, he served as a senior research associate with the Urban Institute and the Urban-Brookings Tax Policy Center.

In December 2014, Harris returned to the White House when Vice President Joseph R. Biden Jr. tapped him to serve as his chief economist and economic advisor. He continued in that role through the end of the Obama administration in January 2017.

After leaving the White House, Harris went to work for Rokos Capital Management as a senior economic policy adviser. He quickly made a transition back to academic and nonprofit work, serving as the chief economist to the evidence-based policy organization Results for America, chief editor of the Biden Forum, and professor at the Northwestern University Kellogg School of Management. In August 2023, he returned to the Brookings Institution to serve as the Vice President and Director of the Economic Studies program.

Harris had a prominent role in shaping the economic policy platforms of the Biden 2020 presidential campaign, and was identified as one of a select group of economists regularly advising Biden. Harris was one of the campaign's most active surrogates, and was named a member of the Biden-Sanders Unity Task Force, serving as one of Biden's five delegates on the economic policy committee. In a November 2020 New York Times article highlighting Harris’ contributions to the Biden campaign platform, Harris was dubbed the “Quiet Architect of Biden’s Plan to Rescue the Economy.” Biden would frequently mention Harris in policy speeches. In April 2020, Chicago Mayor Lori Lightfoot announced Harris will sit on the Chicago COVID-19 Recovery Task Force to advise city government as economic recovery planning efforts get underway in the wake of COVID-19.

On March 11, 2021, President Joe Biden announced his intent to nominate Harris to be Assistant Secretary of the Treasury for Economic Policy. On April 22, 2021, his nomination was sent to the Senate., and he assumed office on November 15, 2021. During his time with the Treasury Department, Harris was widely recognized as a principal official driving the creation and implementation of the price cap on Russian oil. In February 2023, it was announced that Harris would be leaving his position at the Treasury Department. He stepped down in March 2023.

Throughout his career, Harris has taught at various institutions including the Harvard Kennedy School of Government, the University of Maryland School of Public Policy, and Georgetown University.

He and his wife Jessica live in the Washington, D.C. area with their three daughters.
