= George Perry (American economist) =

American economist (born 1934)

George L. Perry
- Born: 1934 (age 91–92); New York City

Academic background
- Education: MIT (Ph.D.)

George L. Perry is an American economist, currently a Senior Fellow emeritus at the Brookings Institution. In 1970, he and Arthur Okun founded the Brookings Panel and its journal, the Brookings Papers on Economic Activity (BPEA). They conceived the Panel as a way to apply rigorous economic research to current economic puzzles, problems and policy issues. After Okun's death in 1980, William Brainard replaced him and Brainard and Perry ran the Panel and edited BPEA until 2007.

In his own research, Perry specializes in labor markets, inflation, fiscal and monetary policy, financial markets, and economic forecasting.

== Life and career ==
George Perry was born in New York in 1934, and grew up in Los Angeles. He enrolled at The Massachusetts Institute of Technology in 1950, and upon graduation served in the U.S. Air Force (1954–1957). After his service, George returned to MIT and received his Ph.D. in economics in 1961. Perry served on the staff of the Council of Economic Advisors under President John F. Kennedy, and subsequently was on the economics faculty at the University of Minnesota, reaching the rank of full professor. In 1969 he returned to Washington to join The Brookings Institution as a Senior Fellow in Economic Studies. In addition to his work at the Brookings Institution, he is a director emeritus of various Dreyfus mutual funds and of the State Farm Mutual Automobile Association and State Farm Life Insurance Company.

== Brookings Papers on Economic Activity ==
Soon after they both arrived at Brookings, George Perry and Arthur Okun founded the Brookings Panel and its Journal, the Brookings Papers on Economic Activity. They would run the Panel meetings and edit BPEA together until Okun's death in 1980. In the following year Perry enlisted William Brainard to replace Okun, and they ran and edited BPEA for the next 27 years.

When Perry and Brainard turned the Panel over to their chosen successors, Steven Pearlstein of The Washington Post commented:

Twice each year beginning in 1970, economists gathered at the Brookings Institution to present and discuss research on developments in macroeconomics. The meetings became known for substantive debate among participants from different academic and policy backgrounds. A later meeting of the panel brought together nearly 100 former participants, including a former chairman of the Federal Reserve and three Nobel laureates, to recognize the contributions of Brookings economist George Perry and Yale professor William Brainard, who had helped oversee the panel for more than 25 years. Perry and Brainard were later succeeded by economists including former Treasury Secretary Lawrence Summers, former Council of Economic Advisers chairman Gregory Mankiw, and Douglas Elmendorf, who held senior roles at the Treasury Department, Federal Reserve, Congress, and the White House.

== Publications ==
Perry has published many research papers in the Brookings Papers on Economic Activity and in other professional journal including the American Economic Review and the National Tax Journal. In addition to his research papers, Perry has authored and edited numerous books including Unemployment, Money Wage Rates, and Inflation (MIT Press, 1996), Curing Chronic Inflation (Brookings, 1978), and Economic Events, Ideas, and Policies: The 1960s and After (Brookings, 2000).

== Personal life ==
George Perry married the former Dina Axelrad in 1987, and they live in Washington, D.C. He has three children by a previous marriage and three grandchildren. He is learning to play the cello.
