= Keith Hall (economist) =

American civil servant

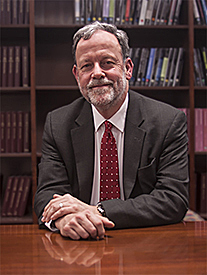

9th Director of the Congressional Budget Office
- In office April 1, 2015 – May 31, 2019
- Preceded by: Douglas Elmendorf
- Succeeded by: Phillip Swagel

Commissioner of the Bureau of Labor Statistics
- In office January 2008 – January 2012
- President: George W. Bush; Barack Obama
- Preceded by: Philip Rones (Acting)
- Succeeded by: Jack Galvin (Acting)

Personal details
- Party: Republican
- Education: University of Virginia (BA); Purdue University, West Lafayette (MS, PhD)

Keith Hall is a prominent economist who has held top leadership and chief economist roles across several major U.S. government economic agencies. He served as the director of the U.S. Congressional Budget Office from 2015 to 2019. He was the Commissioner of the U.S. Bureau of Labor Statistics from 2008 until 2012. And he served as chief economist of the White House Council of Economic Advisers (2005-8), the U.S. Department of Commerce (2002-5), and the U.S. International Trade Commission (2014-15).

== Career ==
Hall was nominated by President George W. Bush to the position of Commissioner of the BLS in September 2007 and confirmed by the Senate in December. He was sworn into office in January 2008 and served a four-year term ending in 2012. Previously, he was Chief Economist for the White House Council of Economic Advisers. He also held the positions of Chief Economist for the Department of Commerce and Senior International Economist for the International Trade Commission's Research Division. He has also served on the faculties of the University of Arkansas and University of Missouri.

On April 1, 2011, Hall testified on Capitol Hill to the United States Congress Joint Economic Committee that the nation's unemployment rate had fallen to 8.8 percent, a two-year low. Statistics released by the BLS showed that non-farm payroll employment rose by 1.5 million from February 2010 and private sector employment increased by 1.8 million during the same period.

Hall was the ninth director of the Congressional Budget Office from April 1, 2015 to May 31, 2019.

== Education ==
Hall received his B.A. from the University of Virginia and his Ph.D. from Purdue University.
