= Center for Retirement Research at Boston College =

US research center

Coordinates: 42.332327°N 71.171591°W

Type	Research center
Established	1998
Location	Boston College, Haley House Chestnut Hill, MA, USA
Director	Andrew D. Eschtruth
Board of Advisors	Stuart Altman, Brandeis University, Barbara Bovbjerg, Government Accountability Office, Peter Diamond, Massachusetts Institute of Technology, J. Mark Iwry, Brookings Institution, Michael Orszag, Towers Watson, Angela O'Rand, Duke University
Website	https://crr.bc.edu/

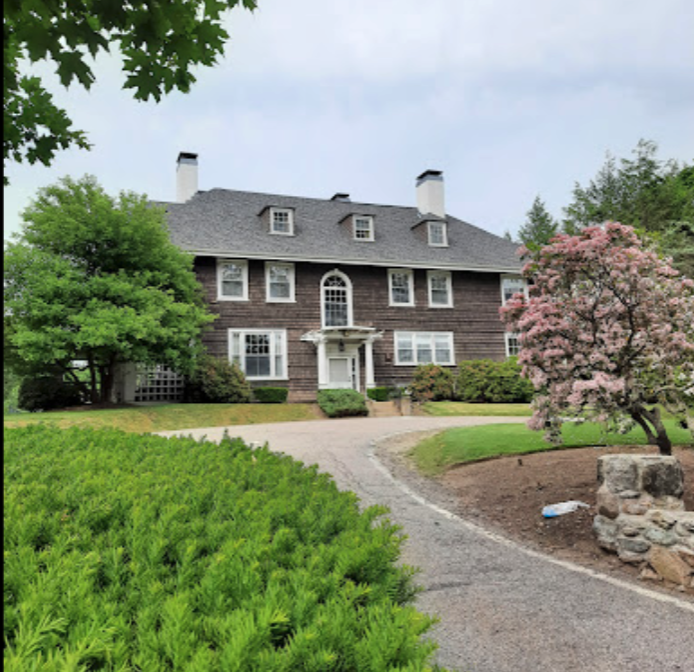
Haley House, Boston College is the center's location.

The Center for Retirement Research at Boston College (CRR) was founded in 1998 by Alicia Munnell through a grant from the U.S. Social Security Administration. The center is a non-profit research institute, affiliated with the Carroll School of Management at Boston College. All of the CRR's research and publications are available to the public on its website.

The center sponsors multiple research projects and disseminates the findings, trains new scholars, and provides access to data on retirement.

== Dissemination and publications ==
The Center distributes its research findings to an audience of government, corporate and labor leaders, the media, and the general public through a variety of publications.

- Issues in Brief: – analyses of topical issues.
- Working Papers: – in-depth review of research issues.
- Squared Away Blog: – blog on financial behavior and money culture.
- Special Projects: – initiatives that go beyond the scope of the center's standard research studies. The most recent special projects include: Public Plans Data website, the National Retirement Risk Index, Measuring and Mitigating Retirement Risks, Closing the Coverage Gap,The Social Security Claiming Guide, and The Social Security Fix-It Book.
