= Brookings Papers on Economic Activity =

- Discipline: Economics
- Language: English
- Edited by: Janice Eberly James H. Stock

Publication details
- History: 1993–present
- Publisher: Brookings Press (USA)
- Frequency: semiannually

Standard abbreviations
- ISO 4: Brook. Pap. Econ. Act.

The Brookings Papers on Economic Activity (BPEA) is a journal of macroeconomics published twice a year by the Brookings Institution Press. Each issue of the journal comprises the proceedings of a conference held biannually by the Economic Studies program at the Brookings Institution in Washington D.C. The conference and journal both "emphasize innovative analysis that has an empirical orientation, take real-world institutions seriously, and is relevant to economic policy."

The journal is written in a clear and accessible manner in order to maximize understanding of economics and policymaking, and covers a variety of macroeconomic topics from housing, business investments, and fiscal and monetary policy, to international capital flows, environmental issues, and more. The journal briefly released an annual issue dedicated to microeconomic issues, but this was dropped as the focus cemented around macroeconomic policy.

BPEA has been ranked as a leading journal in the field since its initial publication in 1970. Economist and former editor Justin Wolfers has said that the journal is "the most public policy-focused of all serious economics journal, or, among all public policy journals, it's the most serious economic analysis." Each issue typically publishes six full-length papers, along with comments by two peer reviewers per paper, and a summary of the general discussion from the conference. The journal is released in hard copy format following the conference, and all past editions are available freely online from the Institution's website.

Former Federal Reserve Chairman Ben Bernanke contributed a paper to the Fall 2018 journal to commemorate the ten-year anniversary of the 2008 financial crisis and the onset of the Great Recession. According to The Wall Street Journal, Bernanke pointed out that "when investors fled from short-term financing markets in 2008, the panic engulfing Wall Street spread to the rest of the economy…" The Wall Street Journal further cited Bernanke's BPEA contribution by noting that "Former Federal Reserve Chairman Ben Bernanke said in a new paper that the credit-market panic that culminated 10 years ago when Lehman Brothers failed better explains the severity of the 2007-09 recession than the housing bust does." Bernanke also discussed in his paper the decision not to rescue Lehman Brothers, and reflected on the ramifications of that choice.

Additionally, the journal also considers the social ramifications of economic policy. For example, the Spring 2019 paper "Mortality and morbidity in the 21st century" by Anne Case and Sir Angus Deaton looked deeply "at a divided America – and its crisis of suicide, overdoses, and drug- and alcohol-fueled diseases." That paper was also cited in the Washington Post for its notable findings, such as, "[s]ickness and early death in the white working class could be rooted in poor job prospects for less-educated young people as they first enter the labor market, a situation that compounds over time through family dysfunction, social isolation, addiction, obesity and other pathologies…".

BPEA commenced publication in 1970 under the editorship of Arthur Okun and George Perry. Their inspiration for starting the journal was to task the best academic economists to apply themselves to real-world policy issues. Former Chair of the Federal Reserve Alan Greenspan was among the initial contributors to the first edition of BPEA. Following Okun's untimely death in 1980, William C. Brainard joined Perry as co-editor from 1980 to 2007. In 2008, the journal was edited by Douglas Elmendorf, N. Gregory Mankiw, and Harvard economist Lawrence H. Summers. Leading economists David Romer and Justin Wolfers served as editors from 2009 to 2015. Presently, Janice C. Eberly and James H. Stock have held the editorship since 2016.

== Nobel Prize–Winning Authors ==
Twenty-three winners of the Nobel Prize in Economics have contributed as authors or discussants for BPEA since its inception in 1970, including:

Michael Kremer (2019)

- "Ending Africa's Poverty Trap" Spring 2004

William Nordhaus (2018)

- "Who's Afraid of a Big Bad Oil Shock?" Fall 2007
- "Productivity Growth and the New Economy" 2002, No. 2
- "The Recent Recession, the Current Recovery, and Stock Prices" 2002, No. 1
- "Policy Games: Coordination and Independence in Monetary and Fiscal Policies" 1994, No. 2
- "Lethal Model 2: The Limits to Growth Revisited" 1992, No. 2
- "Do Borders Matter? Soviet Economic Reform after the Coup" 1991, No. 2
- "Soviet Economic Reform: The Longest Road" 1990, No. 1
- "Alternative Approaches to the Political Business Cycle" 1989, No. 2
- "Oil and Economic Performance in Industrial Countries" 1980, No. 2
- "The Falling Share of Profits" 1974, No. 1
- "The Allocation of Energy Resources" 1973, No. 3
- "The Recent Productivity Slowdown" 1972, No. 3
- "The Worldwide Wage Explosion" 1972, No. 2

Paul M. Romer (2018)

- "Looting: The Economic Underworld of Bankruptcy for Profit" 1993, No. 2
- "Implementing a National Technology Strategy with Self-Organizing Industry Investment Boards" Microeconomics 2, 1993
- "Capital, Labor, and Productivity" Microeconomics 1990

Oliver Hart (2016)

- "The Structure and Performance of the Money Management Industry" 1992, (discussant)
- "Vertical Integration and Market Foreclosure" 1990

Sir Angus Deaton (2015)

- "Mortality and morbidity in the 21st Century" 2017

Jean Tirole (2014)

- "Vertical Integration and Market Foreclosure" 1990

Robert J. Shiller(2013)

- "Understanding Inflation-Indexed Bond Markets" Spring 2009
- "Low Interest Rates and High Asset Prices: An Interpretation in Terms of Changing Popular Economic Models" Fall 2007
- "Is There a Bubble in the Housing Market?" 2003, No. 2
- "What Have They Been Thinking? Homebuyer Behavior in Hot and Cold Markets" Fall 2002
- "Public Resistance to Indexation: A Puzzle" 1997, No. 1
- "Hunting for Homo Sovieticus: Situational versus Attitudinal Factors in Economic Behavior" 1992, No 1
- "Stock Prices and Social Dynamics" 1984, No. 2
- "Forward Rates and Future Policy: Interpreting the Term Structure of Interest Rates" 1983, No. 1

Thomas J. Sargent(2011)

- "Rational Expectations, the Real Rate of Interest, and the Natural Rate of Unemployment" 1973, No. 2
- "Rational Expectations: A Correction" 1973, No. 3

Christopher A. Sims(2011)

- "Monetary Policy Models" Fall 2007
- "The Role of Models and Probabilities in the Monetary Policy Process" 2002, No. 2
- "What Does Monetary Policy Do?" 1996, No. 2
- "Policy Analysis with Econometric Models" 1982, No. 1
- "Output and Labor Input in Manufacturing" 1974, No. 3

Peter A. Diamond(2010)

- "Macroeconomic Aspects of Social Security Reform" 1997, No. 2
- "The Cyclical Behavior of the Gross Flows of U.S. Workers" 1990, No. 2
- "The Beveridge Curve" 1989, No. 1

Christopher A. Pissarides (2010)

- "Is the Greek Debt One of Supply or Demand?" 2015

Oliver E. Williamson(2009)

- "Vertical Integration and Market Foreclosure" 1990 (discussant)

Paul Krugman(2008)

- "Trade and Wages, Reconsidered" Spring 2008
- "Asset Returns and Economic Growth" 2005, No. 1
- "I t's Baaack: Japan's Slump and the Return of the Liquidity Trap" 1998, No. 2
- "Growing World Trade: Causes and Consequences" 1995, No. 1
- "The Persistence of the U.S. Trade Deficit" 1987, No. 1
- "The U.S. Response to Foreign Industrial Targeting" 1984, No. 1
- "Flexible Exchange Rates in the Short Run" 1976, No.

Edmund S. Phelps (2006)

- "Roots of the Recent Recoveries: Labor Reforms or Private Sector Forces?" 2000
- "Causes of the 1980s Slump in Europe" 1986
- "The Medium Run" 1997 (discussant)
- "The Growth of Nations" 1995 (discussant)

George Akerlof (2001)

- "Unfinished Business in the Macroeconomics of Low Inflation: A Tribute to George and Bill by Bill and George" Fall 2007
- "Near-Rational Wage and Price Setting and the Long-Run Phillips Curve" 2000, No. 1
- "The Macroeconomics of Low Inflation" 1996, No. 1
- "Looting: The Economic Underworld of Bankruptcy for Profit" 1993, No. 2
- "East Germany in from the Cold: The economic aftermath of currency union" 1991, No. 1
- "Job switching and job satisfaction in the U.S. labor market" 1988, No. 2

Joseph Stiglitz (2001)

- "Economic Crises: Evidence and Insights from East Asia" 1998, No. 2
- "Examining Alternative Macroeconomic Theories" 1988, No. 1
- "Technological Change, Sunk Costs, and Competition" 1987, No. 3

Daniel L. McFadden (2000)

- "Technological Change, Sunk Costs, and Competition" 1987 (discussant)

Gary S. Becker (1992)

- "Economic Growth and Subjective Well-Being: Reassessing the Easterlin Paradox" 2008 (discussant)

Robert Solow (1987)

- "Deciphering the fall and rise in the net capital share" 2015
- "Manufacturing Wage Dispersion: An End Game Interpretation" 1985 (discussant)
- "U.S. Labor Markets: Imbalance, Wage Growth, and Productivity in the 1970s" 1983 (discussant)
- "Comments and Discussion: The Bosworth and Gordon Papers" 1972, No. 2

Franco Modigliani (1985)

- "Is a Tax Rebate an Effective Tool for Stabilization Policy?" 1977, No. 1
- "Targets for Monetary Policy in the Coming Year" 1975, No. 1

George Stigler (1982)

- "Do Entry Conditions Vary across Markets?" 1988 (discussant)

James Tobin (1981)

- "A Price Target for U.S. Monetary Policy? Lessons from the Experience with Money Growth Targets" 1996 (discussant)
- "Was This Recession Different? Are They All Different?"1993 (discussant)
- "William John Fellner 1905-1983" 1983, No. 2
- "Stabilization Policy Ten Years After" 1980, No. 1
- "Macroeconomic Effects of Selective Public Employment and Wage Subsidies" 1977, No. 2
- "Monetary Policy in 1974 and Beyond" 1974, No. 1
- "Comments and Discussion: The Fellner, Okun, and Gordon Reports" 1971, No. 2

Lawrence Klein (1980)

- "Capacity Utilization: Concept, Measurement, and Recent Estimates" 1973, No. 3
- "Mortgage Credit Availability and Residential Construction" 1979 (discussant)
