= Curtis A. Hessler =

Assistant U.S. Treasury Secretary

Curtis A. Hessler is an American lawyer and the former United States Assistant Secretary of the Treasury for Economic Policy, an office he held from April 4, 1980 to January 20, 1981, during the presidency of Jimmy Carter. With Benjamin W. Heineman Jr., he authored the 1981 book Memorandum to the President: A Strategic Approach to Domestic Affairs in the 1980s, which argued that the failure of Ronald Reagan's domestic policies "is virtually certain". In 1984 he was recruited by Roderick M. Hills to the role of senior vice-president at the newly created Sears World Trade, a short-lived Sears import-export subsidiary that closed two years later after losing $60 million. Originally from Los Angeles, Hessler received his J.D. from Yale Law School and served as a law clerk to Judge J. Skelly Wright on United States Court of Appeals for the District of Columbia Circuit. Hessler worked briefly as a foreign correspondent for Newsweek. He also earned degrees from Harvard College (BA) and the University of California, Berkeley (MA).
