= Charles Schultze =

American economist and government official (1924–2016)

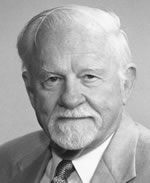

11th Chair of the Council of Economic Advisers
- In office January 22, 1977 – January 20, 1981
- President: Jimmy Carter
- Preceded by: Alan Greenspan
- Succeeded by: Murray Weidenbaum

16th Director of the Bureau of the Budget
- In office June 1, 1965 – January 28, 1968
- President: Lyndon B. Johnson
- Preceded by: Kermit Gordon
- Succeeded by: Charles Zwick

Personal details
- Born: Charles Louis Schultze; December 12, 1924 Alexandria, Virginia, U.S.
- Died: September 27, 2016 (aged 91) Washington, D.C., U.S.
- Party: Democratic
- Spouse: Rita Schultze
- Education: Georgetown University (BA, MA); University of Maryland, College Park (PhD)

Military service
- Allegiance: United States
- Branch/service: United States Army
- Battles/wars: World War II

Charles Louis Schultze (December 12, 1924 – September 27, 2016) was an American economist and public policy analyst. He served as the Chairman of the Council of Economic Advisers during the President Carter Administration. Schultze was appointed the Assistant Director of the Bureau of the Budget by President John F. Kennedy in 1962, and was the director from 1965 until 1968 during President Lyndon Johnson's Great Society agenda. He was also a veteran of World War II, during which he served in the army.

== Biography ==
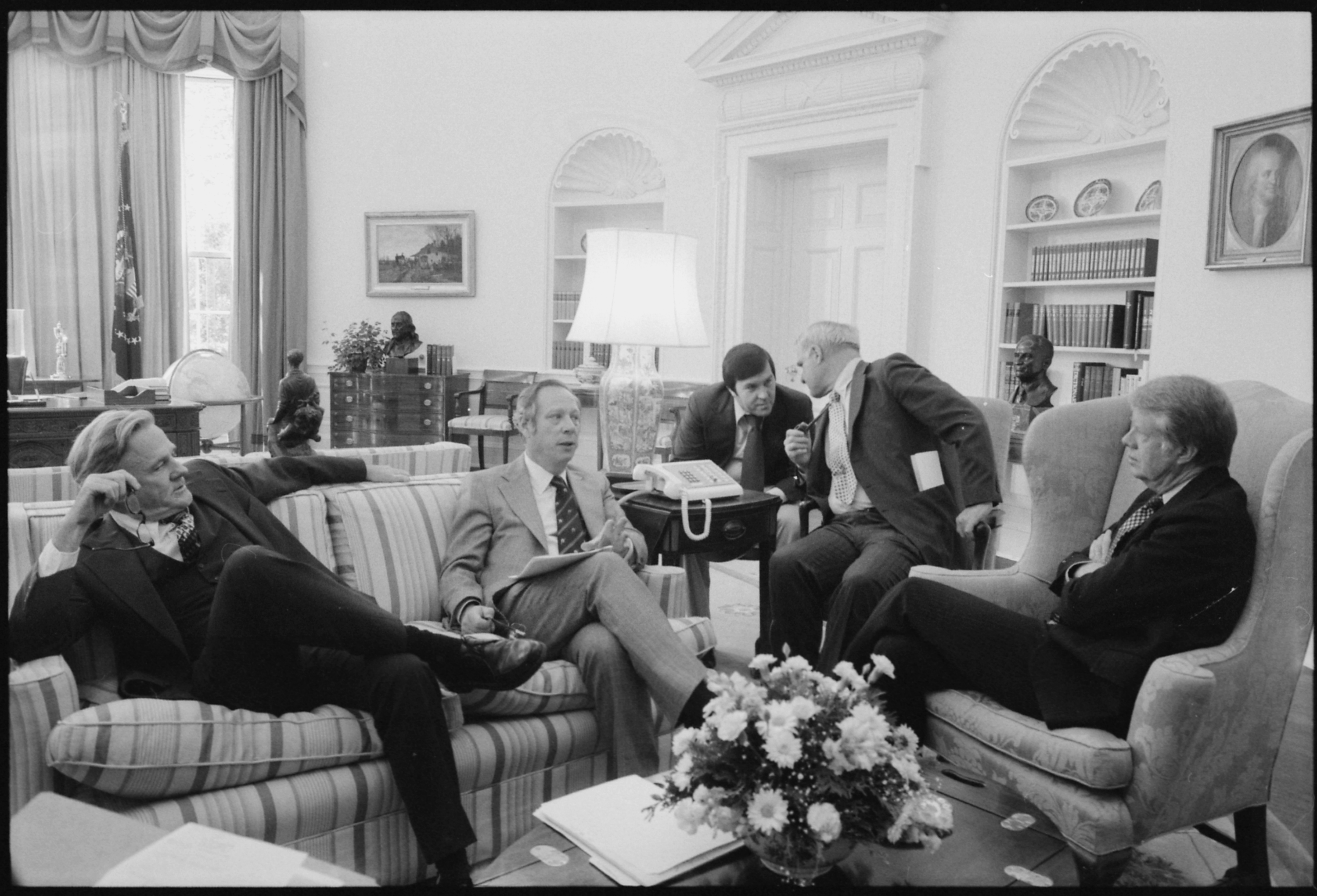
President Carter (far right) meeting with (l to r) Charles Schultze, Michael Blumenthal, Hamilton Jordan and James Schlesinger in the oval office, 1978

A native of Alexandria, Virginia, Schultze graduated from Gonzaga College High School and received his bachelor's (1948) and master's (1950) degrees in economics from Georgetown University. He was awarded a Ph.D. in economics from the University of Maryland in 1960. He was an assistant professor of economics at Indiana University from 1959 to 1962.

He authored or co-authored dozens of books and articles on economics. Most recently, he co-edited a book with Henry J. Aaron titled Setting Domestic Priorities: What Can Government Do? He also completed a study entitled, Memos to the President: A Guide through Macroeconomics for the Busy Policymaker (Brookings, 1992). Among his better known works, several of which have been written in cooperation with other Brookings scholars, are: An American Trade Strategy: Options for the 1990s, co-edited with Brookings Senior Fellow Robert Z. Lawrence (Brookings, 1990); American Living Standards: Threats and Challenges, co-edited with Robert Z. Lawrence and Robert E. Litan (Brookings, 1988); Barriers to European Growth: A Transatlantic View, with Robert Z. Lawrence (Brookings, 1987); Economic Choices 1987 (Brookings, 1986); and Other Times, Other Places (Brookings, 1986).

Schultze was also a frequent contributor to such publications as American Economic Review, The Brookings Review, and Brookings Papers on Economic Activity. In 1984, he served as president of the American Economic Association.

He was involved with the Brookings Institution since 1968. He was director of Economic Studies from 1987–90 and a senior fellow from 1968–1977 and 1981–1987. As a senior fellow emeritus in the Economic Studies program, he was named as the recipient of The John C. and Nancy D. Whitehead Chair in 1997. He died in Washington, D.C., on September 27, 2016, from complications of sepsis. He also had dementia in his later years.

Political offices
Preceded by Kermit Gordon	Director of the Bureau of the Budget; 1965–1968	Succeeded by Charles Zwick
Preceded by Alan Greenspan	Chair of the Council of Economic Advisers; 1977–1981	Succeeded by Murray Weidenbaum
