= Jeremy M. Weinstein =

American professor of political science

Jeremy M. Weinstein is the dean of the Harvard Kennedy School.

Weinstein has a BA from Swarthmore College and an MA and PhD in political economy and government from Harvard University.

== Books ==
- Inside Rebellion: The Politics of Insurgent Violence (Cambridge University Press, 2006)
- with Daniel Posner, James Habyarimana, and Macartan Humphreys Coethnicity: Diversity and the Dilemmas of Collective Action (Russell Sage Foundation, 2009)
- With Mehran Sahami and Rob Reich System Error: Where Big Tech Went Wrong and How We Can Reboot (Harper, 2021)
