= Thomas Silvero =

Argentine footballer

Personal information
- Date of birth: 19 May 2000 (age 26)
- Place of birth: Posadas, Argentina
- Position: Forward

Youth career
- Crucero del Norte

Senior career*
Years	Team	Apps	(Gls)
2017–2019	Crucero del Norte	12	(1)
2019	→ Newell's Old Boys (loan)	0	(0)
2022	CA Bartolomé Mitre (Pos)		
- * Club domestic league appearances and goals as of 21:57, 30 January 2019 (UTC)

Thomas Silvero (born 19 May 2000) is an Argentine professional footballer who plays as a forward.

== Career ==
Silvero got his career underway with Crucero del Norte. He made six appearances in the 2016–17 Primera B Nacional, including for his professional bow on 19 March 2017 during an away loss to Gimnasia y Esgrima; that campaign ended with relegation. He netted his first senior goal in the following November in Torneo Federal A against Gimnasia y Tiro, in what was one of six appearances across two seasons in the third tier. On 23 January 2019, Silvero joined Primera División side Newell's Old Boys on loan.

== Career statistics ==
As of 30 January 2019.

Club statistics
Club	Season	League			Cup		Continental		Other		Total	
Club	Season	Division	Apps	Goals	Apps	Goals	Apps	Goals	Apps	Goals	Apps	Goals
Crucero del Norte	2016–17	Primera B Nacional	6	0	0	0	—		0	0	6	0
Crucero del Norte	2017–18	Torneo Federal A	4	1	0	0	—		0	0	4	1
Crucero del Norte	2018–19	Torneo Federal A	2	0	0	0	—		0	0	2	0
Crucero del Norte	Total		12	1	0	0	—		0	0	12	1
Newell's Old Boys (loan)	2018–19	Primera División	0	0	0	0	—		0	0	0	0
Career total			12	1	0	0	—		0	0	12	1
