= Janice Eberly =

American economist

Jan Eberly
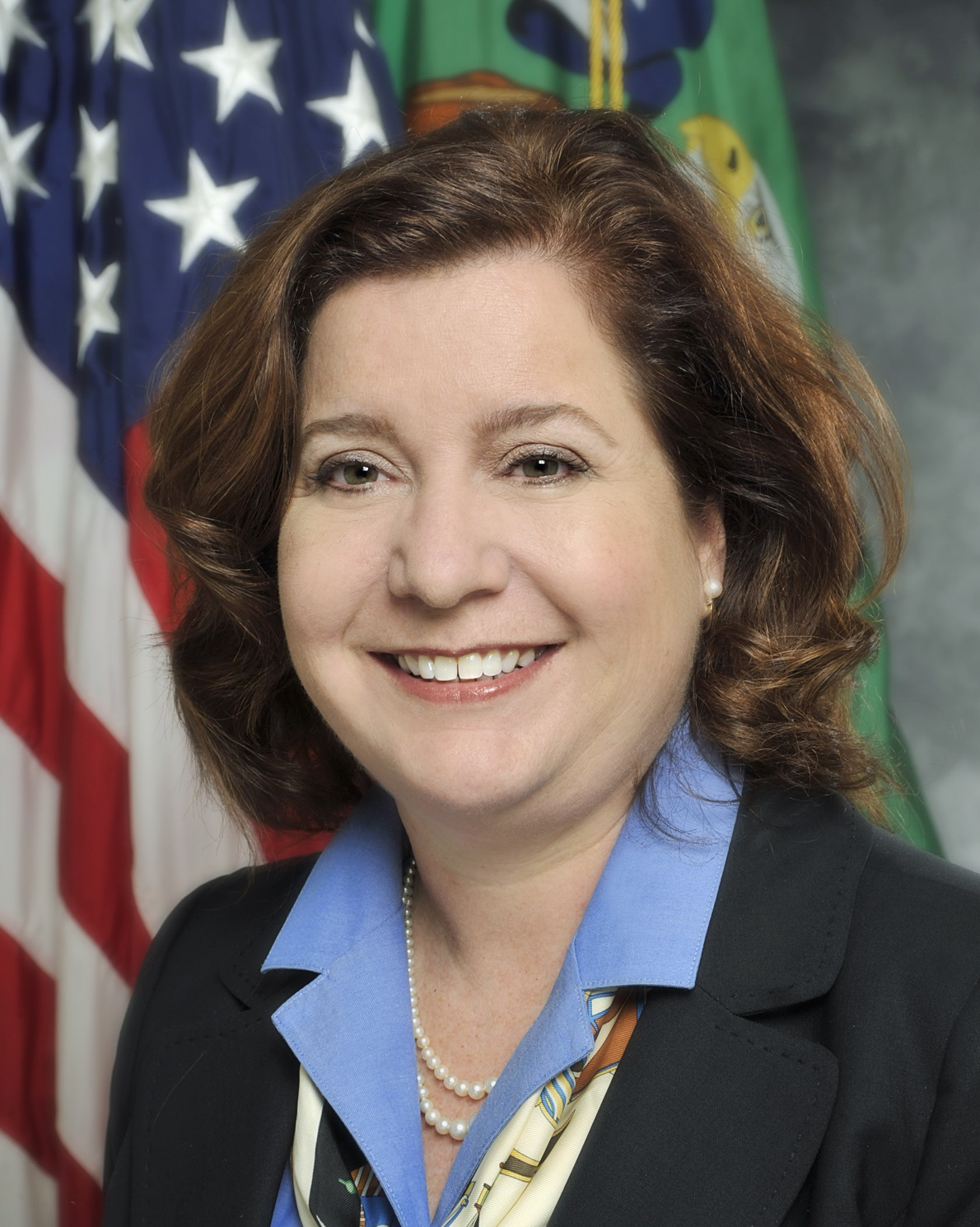

Assistant Secretary of the Treasury for Economic Policy
- In office October 21, 2011 – April 26, 2013
- President: Barack Obama
- Preceded by: Alan B. Krueger
- Succeeded by: Karen Dynan

Personal details
- Born: c. 1964 (age 61–62)
- Party: Democratic
- Education: University of California, Davis (BS); Massachusetts Institute of Technology (MS, PhD)

Janice Caryl "Jan" Eberly (born c. 1964) is an American economist. Since 2002 she has been the James R. and Helen D. Russell Distinguished Professor of Finance at the Kellogg School of Management of Northwestern University. She served from 2011 to 2013 as Assistant Secretary of the Treasury for Economic Policy and chief economist of the United States Department of the Treasury. She was named a Fellow of the American Academy of Arts and Sciences in 2013. Her research focuses on the intersection of macroeconomics and finance.

== Early life and education ==
Eberly grew up on a citrus and avocado ranch in Fallbrook, California. Her father was a Navy veteran and a pilot for United Airlines. She attended Fallbrook Union High School and was active in the school's chapter of Future Farmers of America (FFA). After graduating in 1981 as valedictorian she served as the first female California State President of FFA. In 1982 she became the first female national president of FFA.

Eberly entered the University of California, Davis as an undergraduate in 1983. During the 1985–86 school year, when she was a junior, she was the student member of the Regents of the University of California, the governing body of the University of California system. In this capacity, she voted against continuing the university's management of two national laboratories involved in nuclear weapons research: Lawrence Livermore National Laboratory and Los Alamos National Laboratory. Stanley Sheinbaum was the only one of the other 12 regents to vote with her. The University of California ceased direct management of these laboratories in 2007 and 2006 respectively. She graduated in June 1986 with a Bachelor of Science in agricultural economics and was named valedictorian.

After becoming interested in macroeconomics during her undergraduate years, Eberly went on to graduate work in economics at the Massachusetts Institute of Technology. Olivier Blanchard was her advisor. She was a National Science Foundation Graduate Research Fellow from 1986 to 1989 and a Sloan Fellow from 1990 to 1991. During graduate school she spent one year as a junior economist in George H. W. Bush's Council of Economic Advisers. She earned her Ph.D. in 1991.

== Career ==
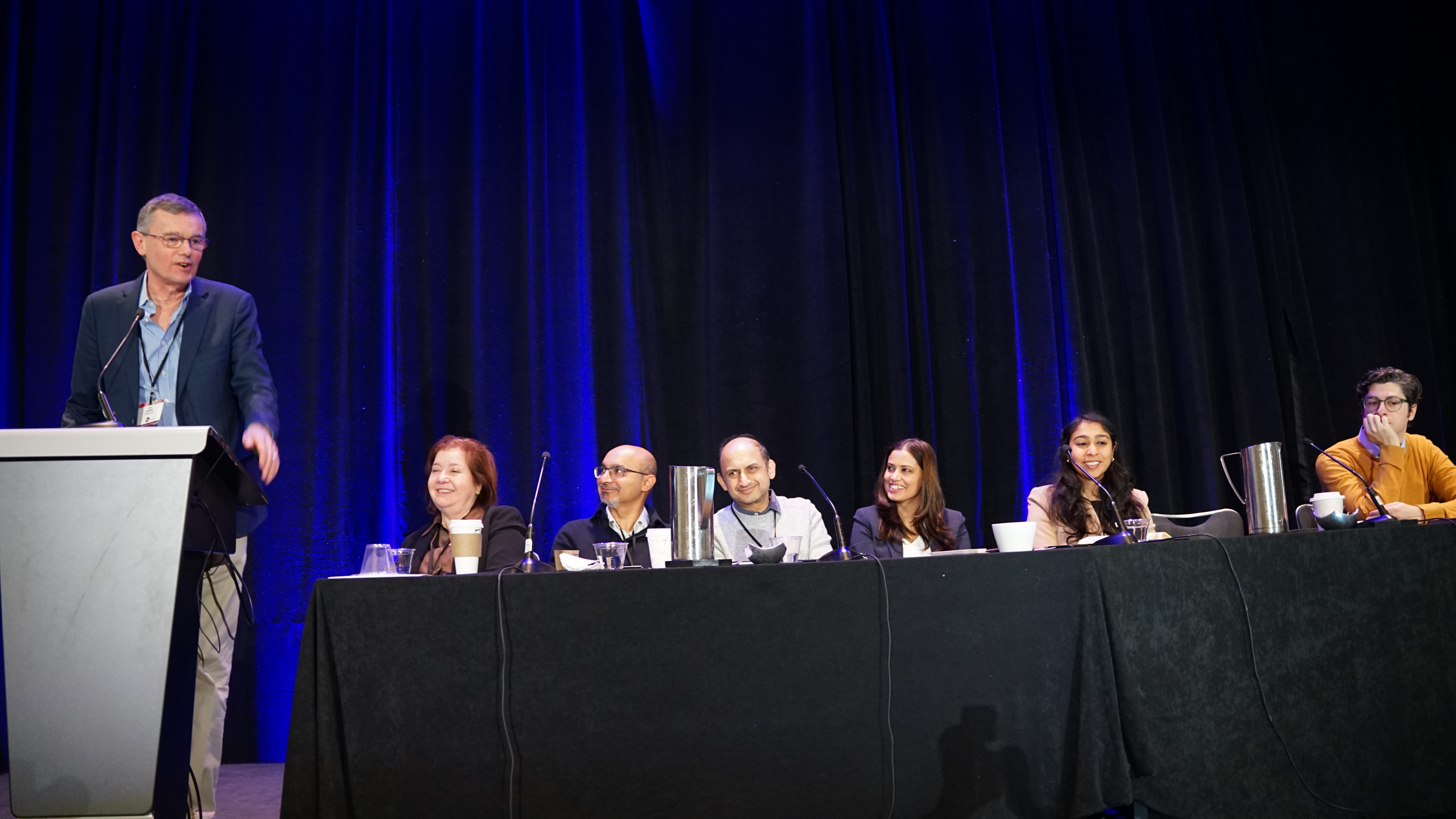
Eberly chairing AFA panel at ASSA 2026 ft. John Y. Campbell, Arvind Krishnamurthy, Viral Acharya, Ishita Sen, Pari Sastry, Valentin Haddad

After earning her Ph.D., Eberly joined the faculty of the Wharton School of the University of Pennsylvania as an assistant professor of finance in 1991. Between 1995 and 1996 she had visiting appointments at MIT and Harvard University. She became an associate professor of finance in 1997. After spending 1997–98 as a visiting associate professor at Northwestern University's Kellogg Graduate School of Management, she moved to Kellogg full-time in 1998. In 2002 she was named the James R. and Helen D. Russell Distinguished Professor of Finance. She has been a visiting scholar at the Federal Reserve Board of Governors, and the Federal Reserve Banks of Philadelphia and Minneapolis. She was named a Fellow of the American Academy of Arts and Sciences in 2013.

Eberly took a leave from Kellogg to serve as Assistant Secretary of the Treasury for Economic Policy and chief economist of the United States Department of the Treasury. President Barack Obama announced he would nominate her to the position in May 2011, and the U.S. Senate confirmed her the following October. In this position she led the Office of Economic Policy, which analyzes the U.S. and world economies, and made policy recommendations in areas ranging from the budget to education and housing. She stepped down in April 2013 to return to Kellogg.

Later in 2013 the Obama administration considered appointing Eberly to a vacant seat on the Fed Board of Governors.

== Research ==
Eberly trained as a macroeconomist at MIT but has taught in finance departments at business schools since 1991. She described her research in general as exploring the intersection between the two fields. Specifically, she thinks about decision making in both firms and households and how these impact the broader economy.
