= Alan Krueger =

American economist (1960–2019)

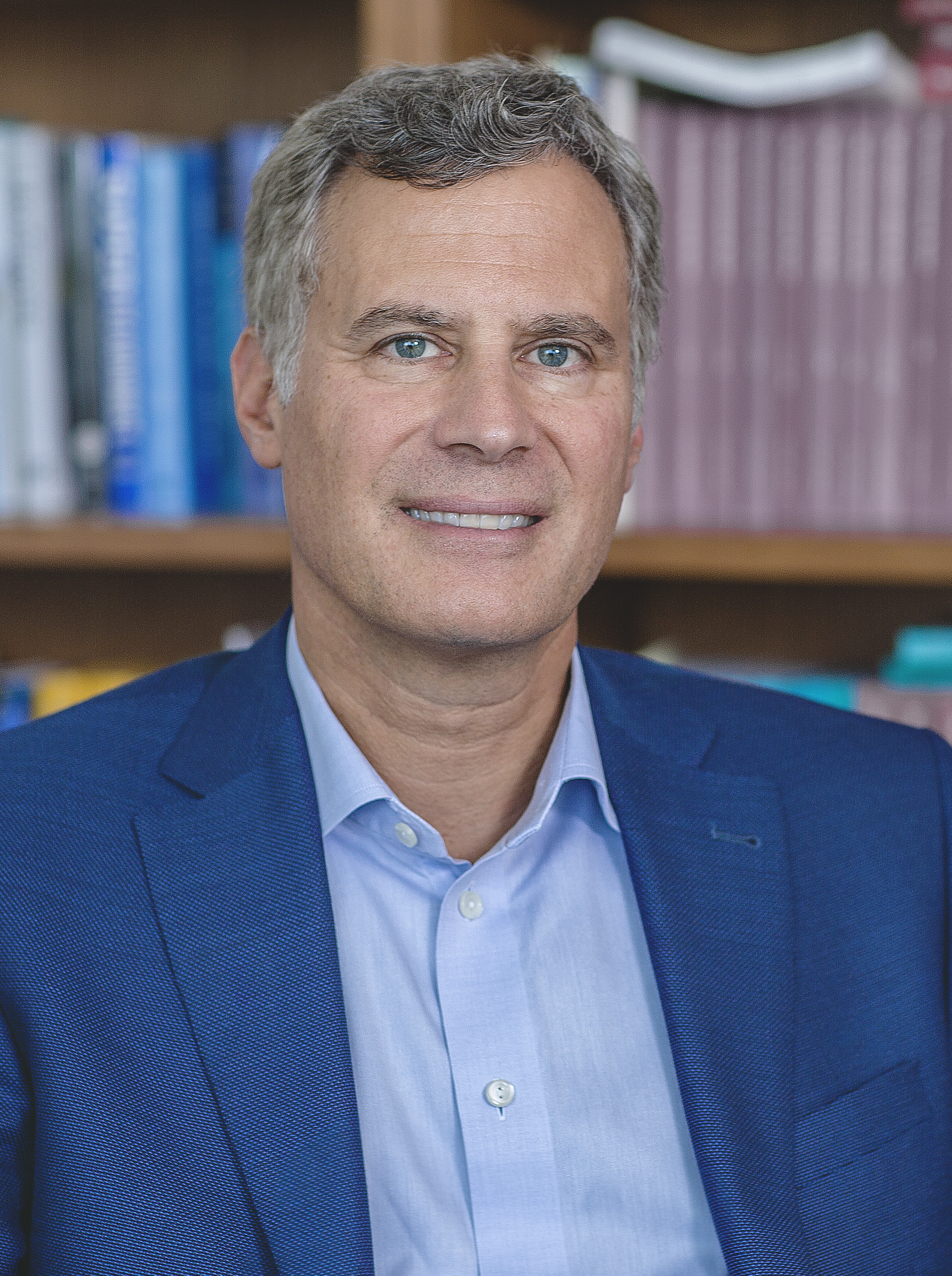
- Krueger in 2017

27th Chair of the Council of Economic Advisers
- In office November 7, 2011 – August 2, 2013
- President: Barack Obama
- Preceded by: Austan Goolsbee
- Succeeded by: Jason Furman

Assistant Secretary of the Treasury for Economic Policy
- In office May 7, 2009 – October 16, 2010
- President: Barack Obama
- Preceded by: Phillip Swagel
- Succeeded by: Janice Eberly

Personal details
- Born: Alan Bennett Krueger; September 17, 1960 Livingston, New Jersey, U.S.
- Died: March 16, 2019 (aged 58) Princeton, New Jersey, U.S.
- Party: Democratic
- Spouse: Lisa Simon
- Children: 2
- Education: Cornell University (BS); Harvard University (MA, PhD)

Academic background
- Doctoral advisor: Lawrence Summers; Richard B. Freeman

Academic work
- Discipline: Labor economics Macroeconomics; Public finance
- Institutions: Princeton University; U.S. Department of Labor
- Website: Information at IDEAS / RePEc

Alan Bennett Krueger (September 17, 1960 – March 16, 2019) was an American economist who was the James Madison Professor of Political Economy at Princeton University and Research Associate at the National Bureau of Economic Research. He served as Assistant Secretary of the Treasury for Economic Policy, nominated by President Barack Obama, from May 2009 to October 2010, after which he returned to Princeton. In 2011 he was nominated by Obama to chair the White House Council of Economic Advisers, a role he served in from November 2011 to August 2013.

Krueger was among the 50 highest ranked economists in the world according to Research Papers in Economics. He is widely renowned for making innovative use of natural experiments in his research, which included influential articles published in the 1990s challenging the then-dominant perspective that minimum wage adversely affected employment. He also made prominent contributions to research on inequality and the economic effects of education.

== Early life and education ==
Krueger grew up in a Jewish family in Livingston, New Jersey, and graduated from Livingston High School in 1979.

Krueger received his B.S. from the Cornell University School of Industrial and Labor Relations (with honors), and he received his M.A. and Ph.D. in Economics from Harvard University in 1985 and 1987, respectively.

== Career ==
Krueger began teaching at Princeton University in 1987. He held the Bendheim Professorship in Economics and Public Affairs followed by the James Madison Professorship in Political Economy.

Krueger developed and applied the method of natural experiments to study the effect of education on earnings, the minimum wage on employment, and other issues.

Krueger compared restaurant jobs in New Jersey, which raised its minimum wage, to restaurant jobs in Pennsylvania, which did not, and found that restaurant employment in New Jersey increased, while it decreased in Pennsylvania. The results reinvigorated the academic debate on the employment effects of minimum wages and spawned a large literature.

His books, Education Matters: Selected Essays by Alan B. Krueger and (with James Heckman) Inequality in America: What Role for Human Capital Policies? reviewed the available research relating to positive externalities accruing to society from increased government investment in educating the children of the poor. In Inequality in America, he writes:

I would emphasize that I do not envision investment in human capital development as the sole component of a program to address the adverse consequences of income inequality. It is part of the solution, but not the whole solution. In principle, the optimal governmental policy regarding income inequality would employ multiple instruments, up to the point at which the social benefit per additional dollar of cost of each instrument is equal across all instruments.

In his book What Makes a Terrorist: Economics and the Roots of Terrorism (2007), Krueger wrote that, in contrast to the assumption that terrorists come from impoverished, uneducated environments, they often come from middle-class, college-educated backgrounds.

In 1994–95, he served as Chief Economist at the United States Department of Labor. He received the Kershaw Prize, Mahalanobis Prize, and IZA Prize (with David Card), and was a fellow of the American Academy of Arts and Sciences, Society of Labor Economists, Econometric Society and American Academy of Political and Social Science. He was a member of the Executive and Supervisory Committee (ESC) of CERGE-EI, an academic institution located in Prague, Czech Republic.

On March 7, 2009, he was nominated by President Barack Obama to be Assistant Secretary of the Treasury for Economic Policy. In October 2010, he announced his resignation from the Treasury Department, to return to Princeton University.

On August 29, 2011, he was nominated by Obama to be chair of the White House Council of Economic Advisers, and on November 3, 2011, the Senate unanimously confirmed his nomination.

He also published several books on issues related to education, labor markets and income distribution. He was also known for his work on the Environmental Kuznets curve. Between 2000 and 2006 he wrote for The New York Times Economic Scene column.

Uber paid Krueger about $100,000 in 2015 to write in support of its job-creation model.

Krueger signed a 2018 amici curiae brief that expressed support for Harvard University in the Students for Fair Admissions v. President and Fellows of Harvard College lawsuit.

== Personal life ==
Krueger was married to Lisa Simon and had two children.

== Death and legacy ==
Krueger was found dead at his home in Princeton on March 16, 2019. His family stated the cause of death was suicide. In a statement, former President Obama declared: "Alan was someone who was deeper than numbers on a screen and charts on a page," adding, "He saw economic policy not as a matter of abstract theories, but as a way to make people's lives better." He was commemorated by The Economist with a full-page obituary running in their Free Exchange column.

David Card, co-author with Krueger of their influential 1994 paper on the effect of raising the minimum wage, stated that it was "unambiguously clear" that if Krueger were still alive, he would have shared in Card's 2021 Nobel Memorial Prize in Economic Sciences.

== Books ==
- Card, David; Krueger, Alan B. (1995). Myth and Measurement: The New Economics of the Minimum Wage. Princeton: Princeton University Press. ISBN 0-691-04823-1.
- Krueger, Alan B. (2001). Education Matters: Selected Essays by Alan B. Krueger. Cheltenham, UK: Edward Elgar. ISBN 1-84064-106-1.
- Heckman, James J.; Krueger, Alan B. (2003). Inequality in America: What Role for Human Capital Policies?. MIT Press. ISBN 0-262-08328-0.
- Krueger, Alan B. (2007). What Makes a Terrorist: Economics and the Roots of Terrorism. Princeton: Princeton University Press. ISBN 978-0-691-13438-3.
- Krueger, Alan B. (2019). Rockonomics: A Backstage Tour of What the Music Industry Can Teach Us About Economics and Life. Currency. ISBN 978-1-5247-6371-8.

Political offices
Preceded by Phil Swagel	Assistant Secretary of the Treasury for Economic Policy; 2009–2010	Succeeded by Jan Eberly
Preceded by Austan Goolsbee	Chair of the Council of Economic Advisers; 2011–2013	Succeeded by Jason Furman
