= Thomas B. Silver =

American historian

Thomas B. Silver (1947 – December 26, 2001) was an American author and scholar who was president of the Claremont Institute. His first book, Coolidge and the Historians, a biography of President Calvin Coolidge, was considered to be a favorite of a later president, Ronald Reagan. He had a bachelor's degree in political science from Kalamazoo College and a doctorate in government from Claremont Graduate School.

He died of an aggressive brain tumor at St. Jude's Hospital in Fullerton, California, at the age of 54.
