= Price controls =

Governmental restrictions on prices

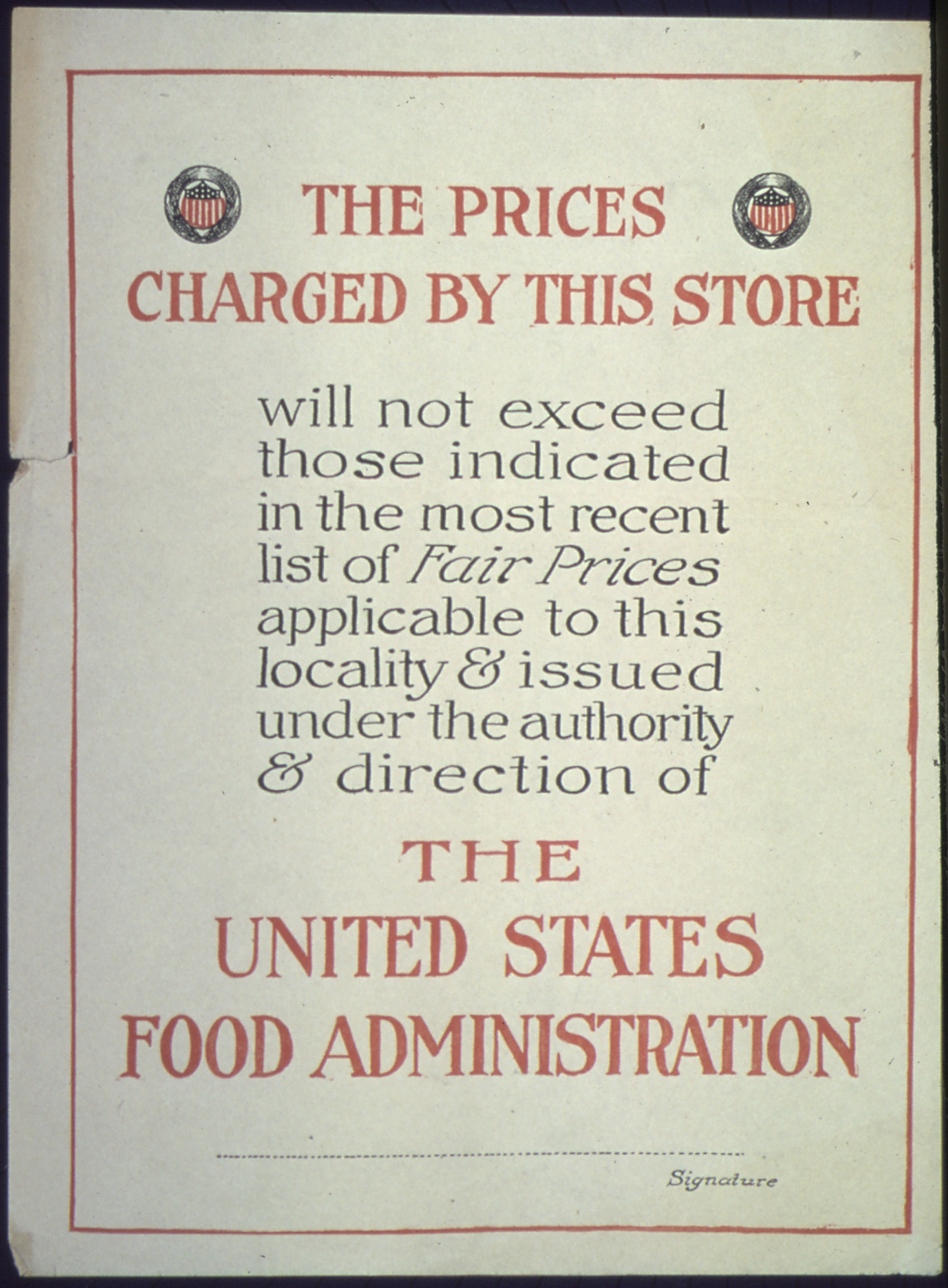
World War I poster of the United States Food Administration

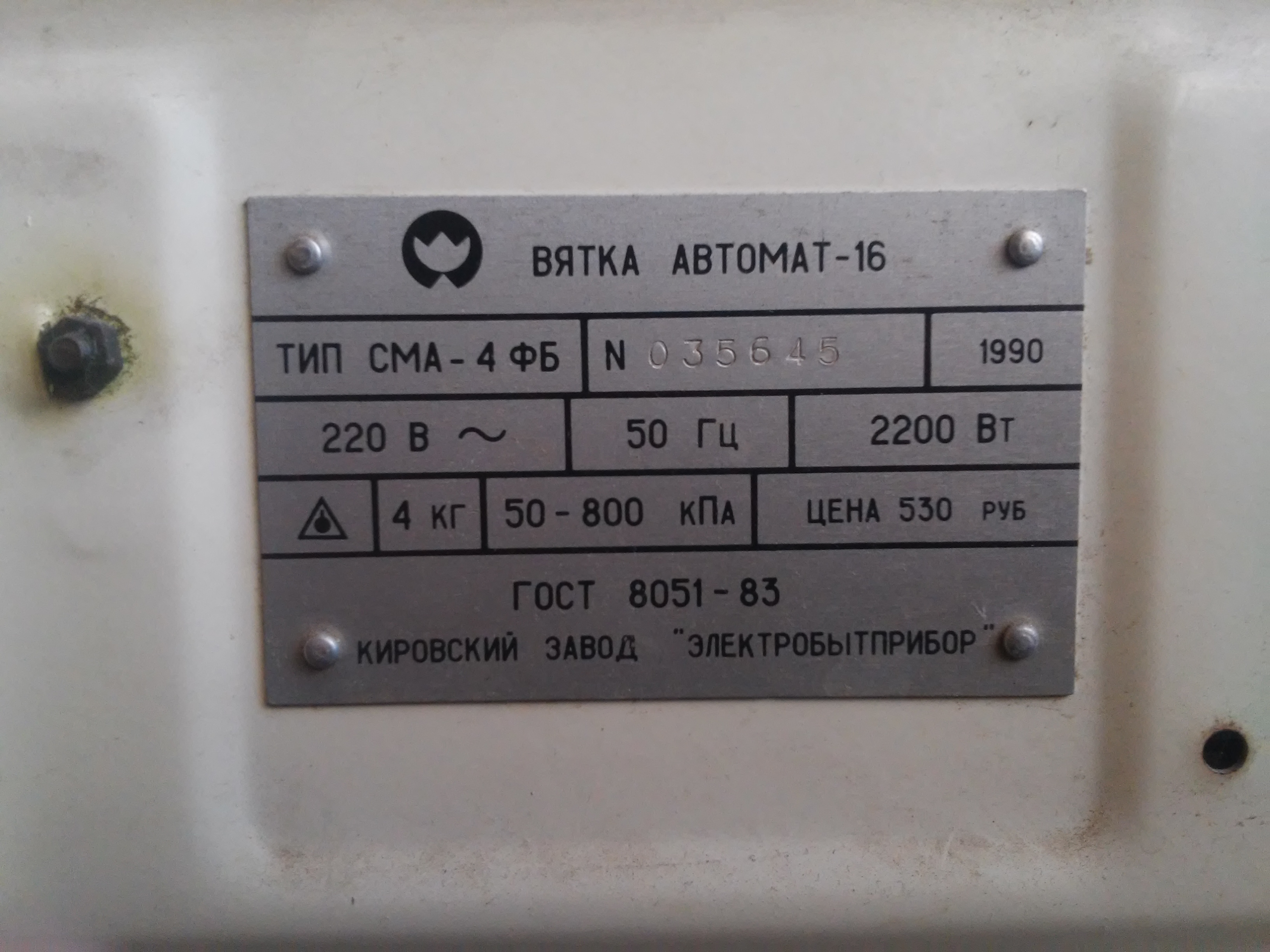
A tag on a Soviet washing maсhine, 1990. Due to price controls in the USSR, the retail price (530 roubles) is also indicated on it.

Price controls are restrictions set in place and enforced by governments, on the prices that can be charged for goods and services in a market. The intent behind implementing such controls can stem from the desire to maintain affordability of goods even during shortages, and to slow inflation, or alternatively to ensure a minimum income for providers of certain goods or to try to achieve a living wage. There are two primary forms of price control: a price ceiling, the maximum price that can be charged; and a price floor, the minimum price that can be charged. A well-known example of a price ceiling is rent control, which limits the increases that a landlord is permitted by government to charge for rent. A widely used price floor is minimum wage (wages are the price of labor). Historically, price controls have often been imposed as part of a larger incomes policy package also employing wage controls and other regulatory elements.

Although price controls are routinely used by governments, Western economists generally agree that consumer price controls do not accomplish what they intend to in market economies, and many economists instead recommend such controls should be avoided; however, since the credibility revolution started in the 1990s, minimum wages have found strong support among some economists.

== History ==
Price control policy has existed since ancient times. The Code of Hammurabi Law 234 (c. 1755–1750 BC), for example, stipulated a 2-shekel wage for each 60-gur (300-bushel) vessel constructed in employment contracts with ship builders, among many other laws regulating commodity prices and wage labor rates.

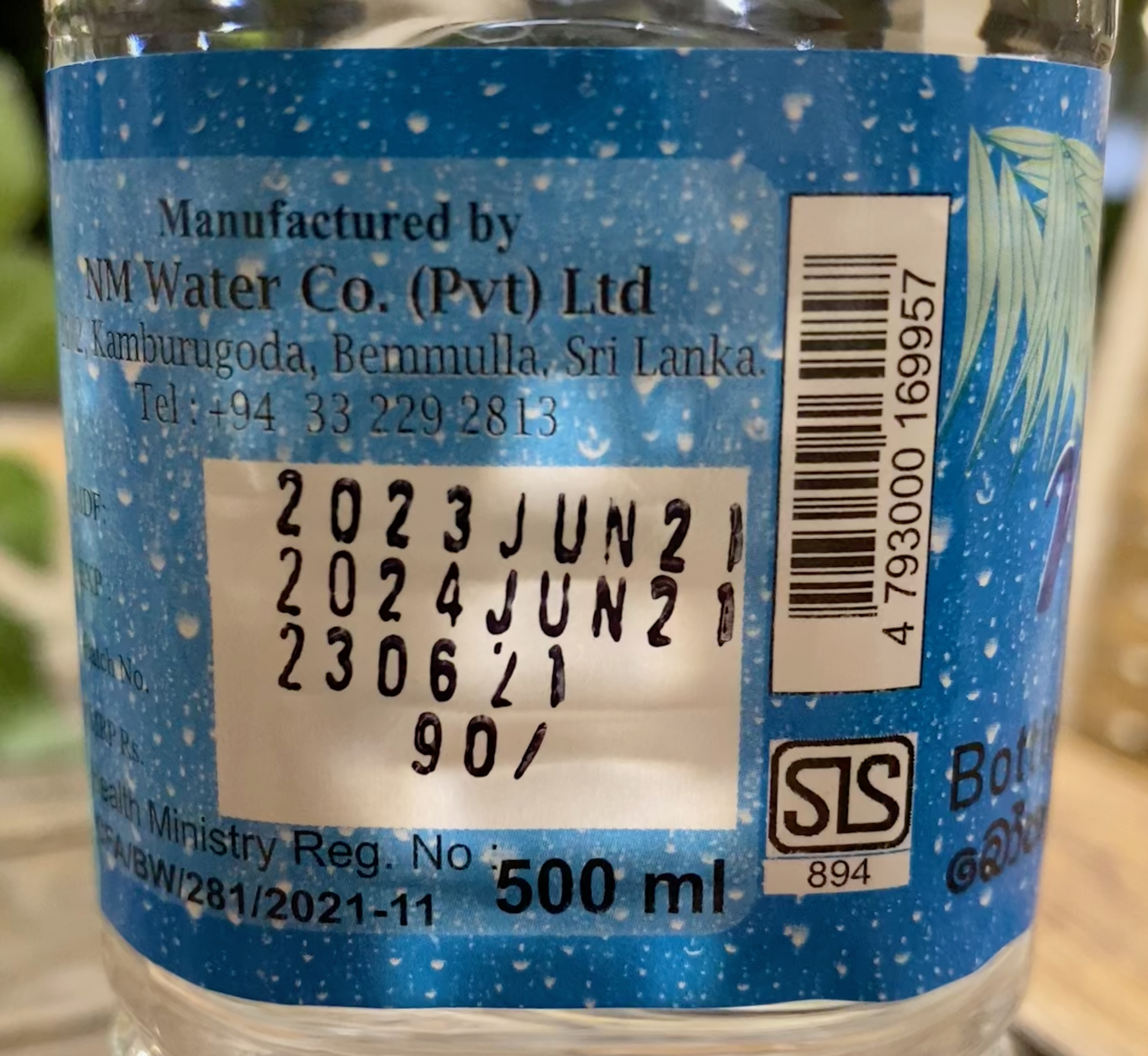
The maximum retail price (MRP) of this bottle of water in Sri Lanka is 90 Rupees

The Roman Emperor Diocletian tried to set maximum prices for all commodities in the late 3rd century AD but with little success. In the early 14th century, the Delhi Sultanate ruler Alauddin Khalji instituted several market reforms, which included price-fixing for a wide range of goods, including grains, cloth, slaves and animals. However, a few months after his death, these measures were revoked by his son Qutbuddin Mubarak Shah. During the French Revolution, the General Maximum set price limits on the sale of food and other staples. Within Spain in the 16th and 17th centuries, after the price revolution, a permanent regulation on the price of wheat (called tasa del trigo) was established. This intervention was discussed by theologians and jurists of this time.

Governments in planned economies typically control prices on most or all goods but have not sustained high economic performance and have been almost entirely replaced by mixed economies. Price controls have also been used in modern times in less-planned economies, such as rent control. During World War I, the United States Food Administration enforced price controls on food. Price controls were also imposed in the US and Nazi Germany during World War II.

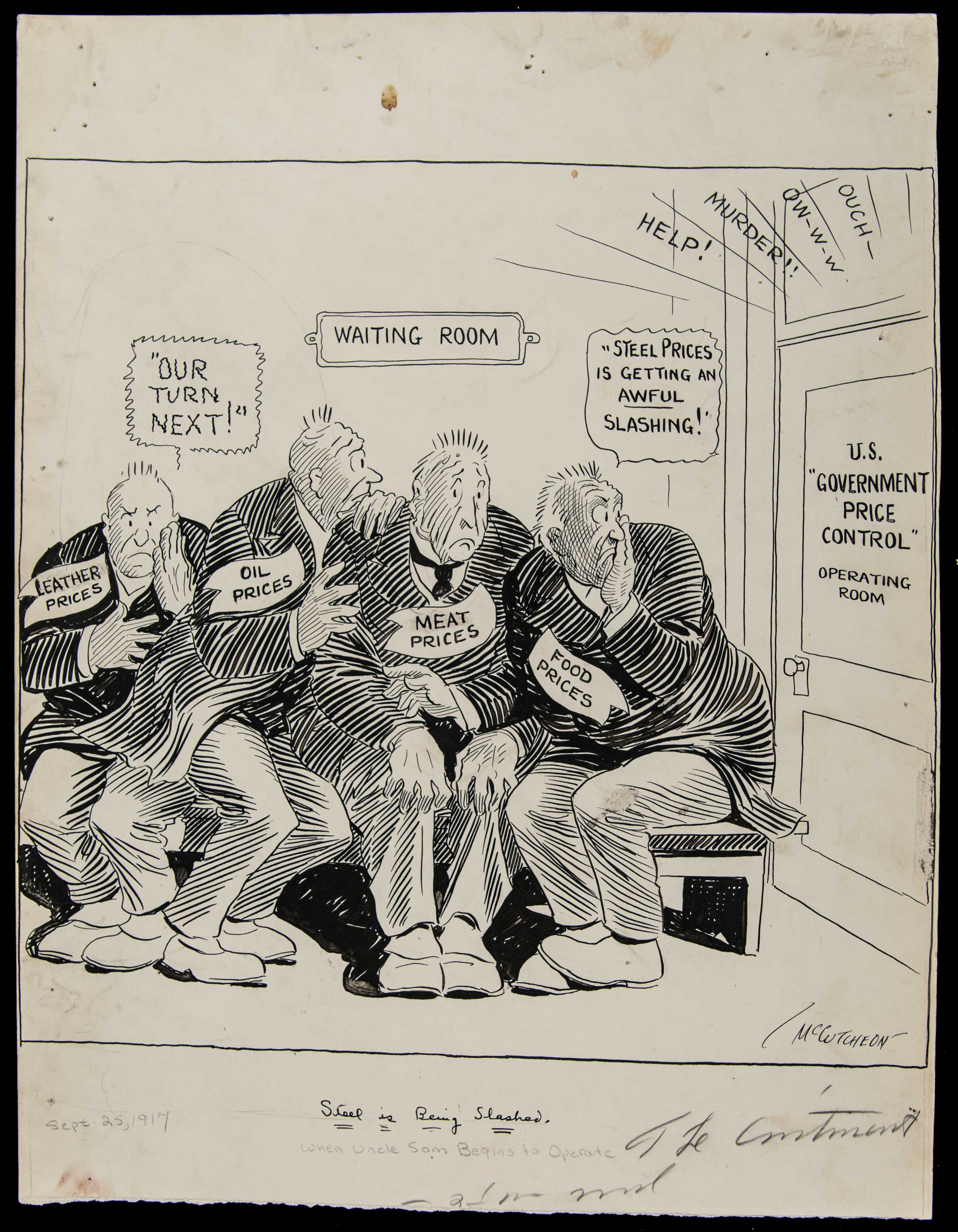
Several anthropomorphized industries sit in fear while waiting for the judgment from U.S. price control measures.

=== Postwar ===
Wage controls have been tried in many countries to reduce inflation, seldom with success. Since inflation can be caused by both aggregate supply or demand, wage controls can fail as a result of supply shocks or excessive stimulus during times of high sovereign debt (increases to the Monetary Aggregate System M2).

==== United Kingdom ====
The National Board for Prices and Incomes was created by the government of Harold Wilson in 1965 in an attempt to solve the problem of inflation in the British economy by managing wages and prices. The Prices and Incomes Act 1966 c. 33 affected UK labour law, regarding wage levels and price policies. It allowed the government to begin a process to scrutinise rising levels of wages (then around 8% per year) by initiating reports and inquiries and ultimately giving orders for a standstill. The objective was to control inflation. It proved unpopular after the 1960s.

==== United States ====
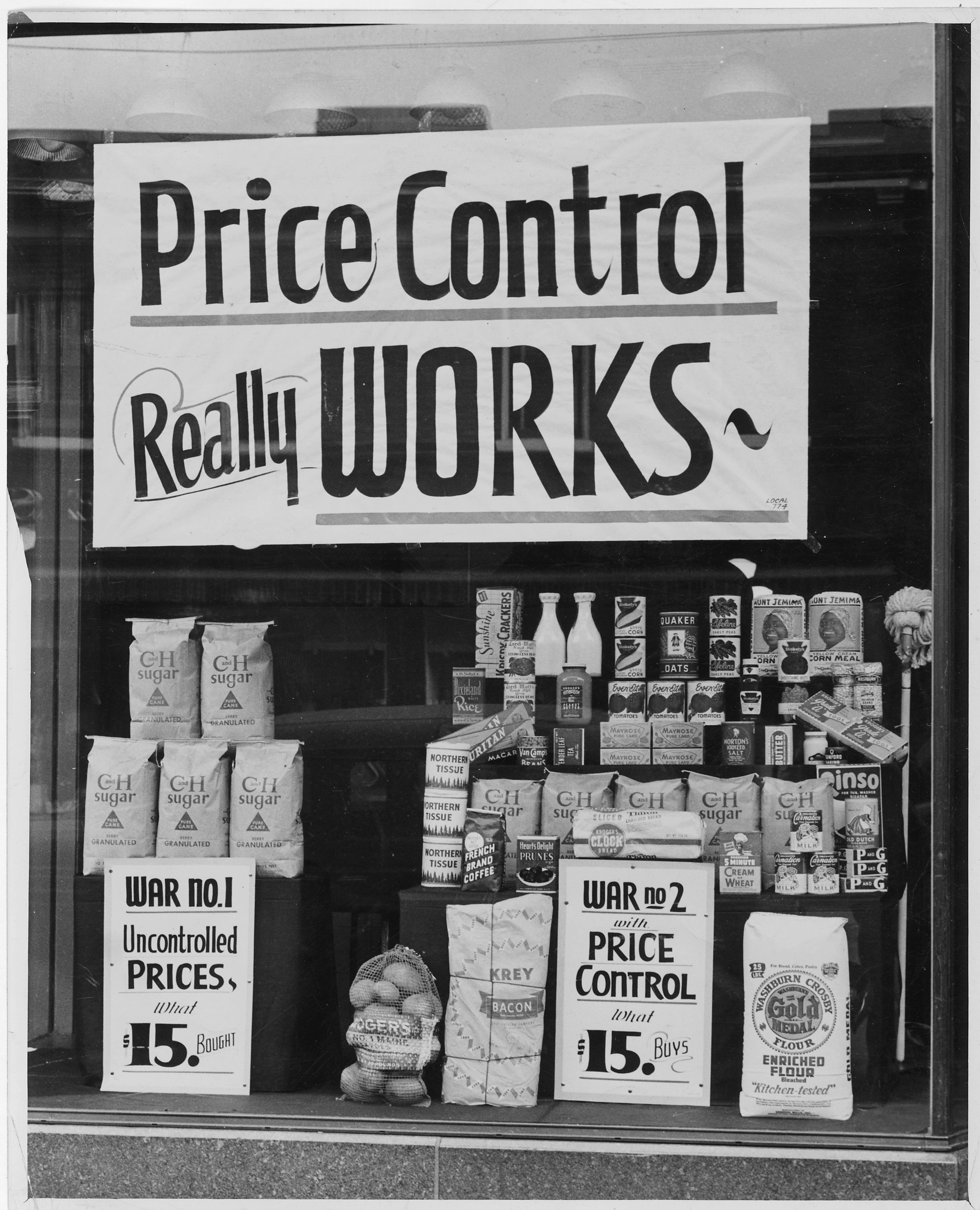
A World War II-era shop display promoting price controls.

In the United States, price controls have been enacted several times. The first time price controls were enacted nationally was in 1906 as a part of the Hepburn Act. In World War I the War Industries Board was established to set priorities, fix prices, and standardize products to support the war efforts of the United States. During the 1930s, the National Industrial Recovery Act (NIRA) created the National Recovery Administration, that set prices and created codes of "fair practices". In May 1935, the Supreme Court held that the mandatory codes section of NIRA were unconstitutional, in the court case of Schechter Poultry Corp. v. United States.

During World War II, the Office of Price Administration handled price controls. During the Korean War, the Economic Stabilization Agency instituted price controls. In 1971, President Richard Nixon issued Executive Order 11615 (pursuant to the Economic Stabilization Act of 1970), imposing a 90-day freeze on wages and prices. The constitutionality of this action was challenged and upheld in the case of Amalgamated Meat Cutters v. Connally.

The individual states have sometimes chosen to implement their own control policies. In the 1860s, several midwestern states of the United States, namely Minnesota, Iowa, Wisconsin, and Illinois, enacted a series of laws called the Granger Laws, primarily to regulate rising fare prices of railroad and grain elevator companies. The state of Hawaii briefly introduced a cap on the wholesale price of gasoline (the Gas Cap Law) in an effort to fight "price gouging" in that state in 2005. Because it was widely seen as too soft and ineffective, it was repealed shortly thereafter.

==== Venezuela ====
According to Girish Gupta from The Guardian, price controls have created a scarcity of basic goods and made black markets flourish under President Nicolás Maduro.

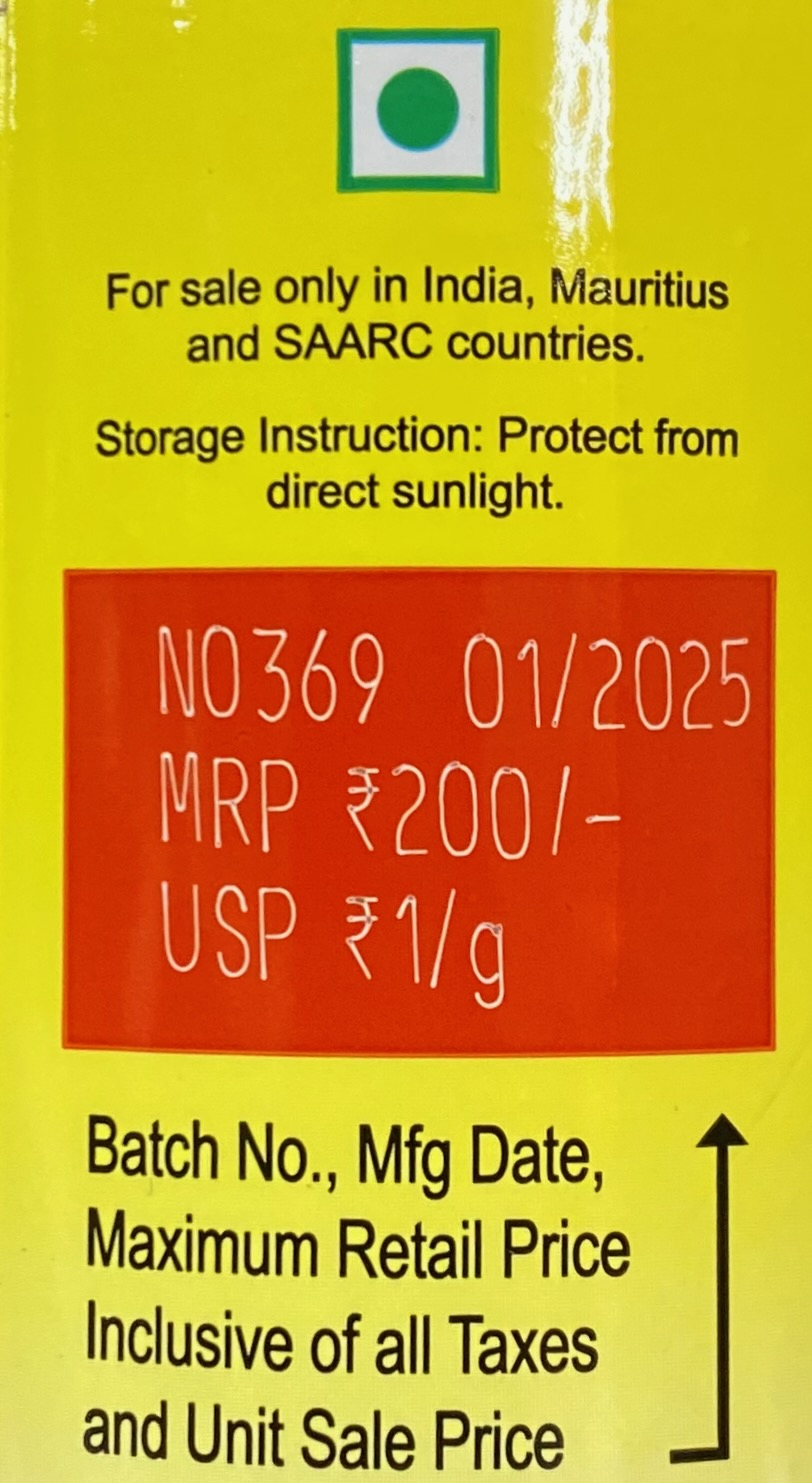
Indian Maximum Retail Price label

==== India ====
In India, the government first enacted price controls in 2013 for the Drug Price Control Order (DPCO). This order gave the local regulatory body and the Pharmaceutical Pricing Authority the power to set ceiling prices on the National List of Essential medicines.

==== Sri Lanka ====
In Sri Lanka, the Consumer Affairs Authority has the power to set the Maximum Retail Price (MRP) for goods specified by the government as essential commodities. In 2021 the Sri Lankan government enacted price controls on several essential items resulting in shortages.

== Price floor ==
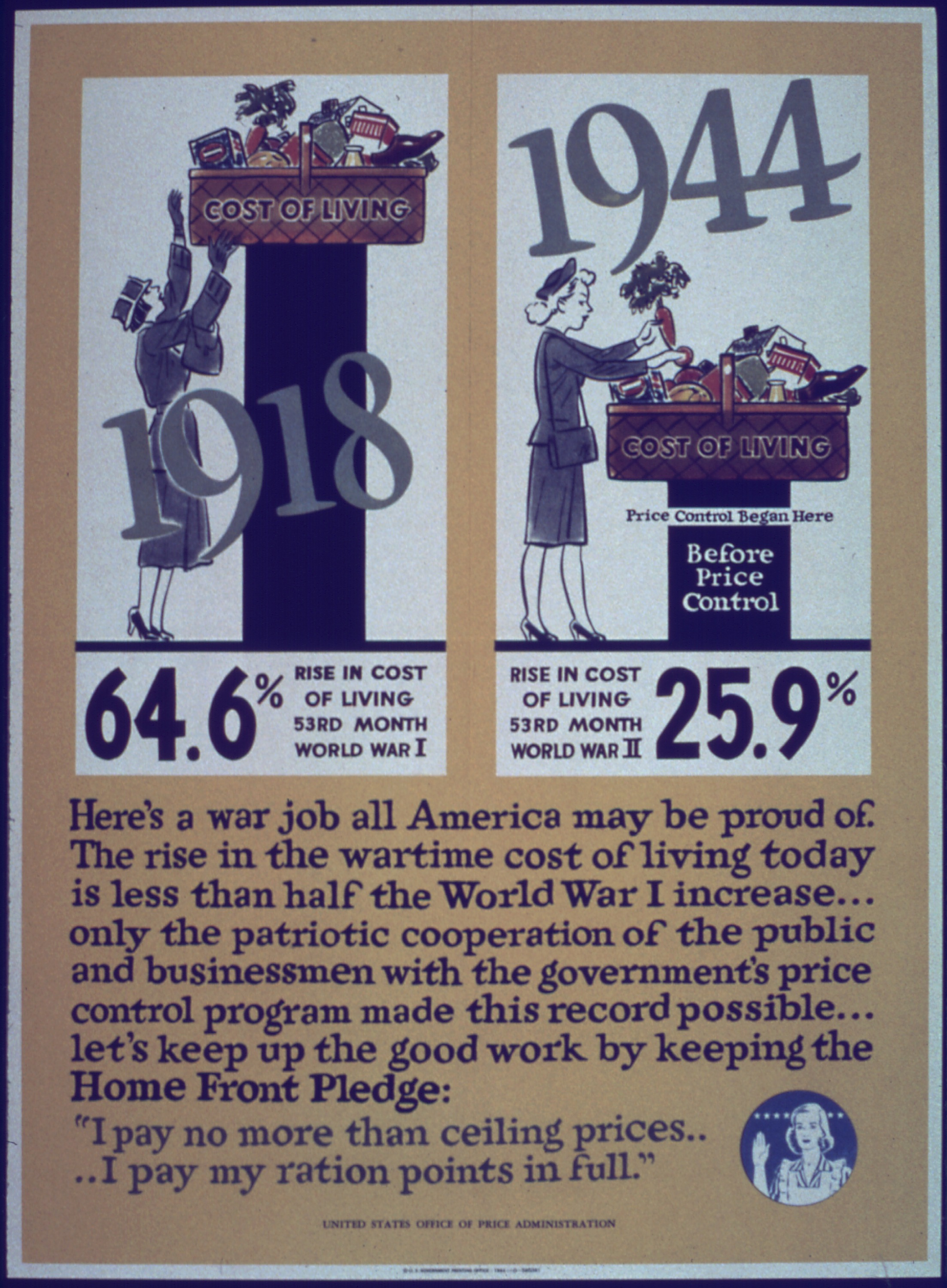
World War II poster about US price controls

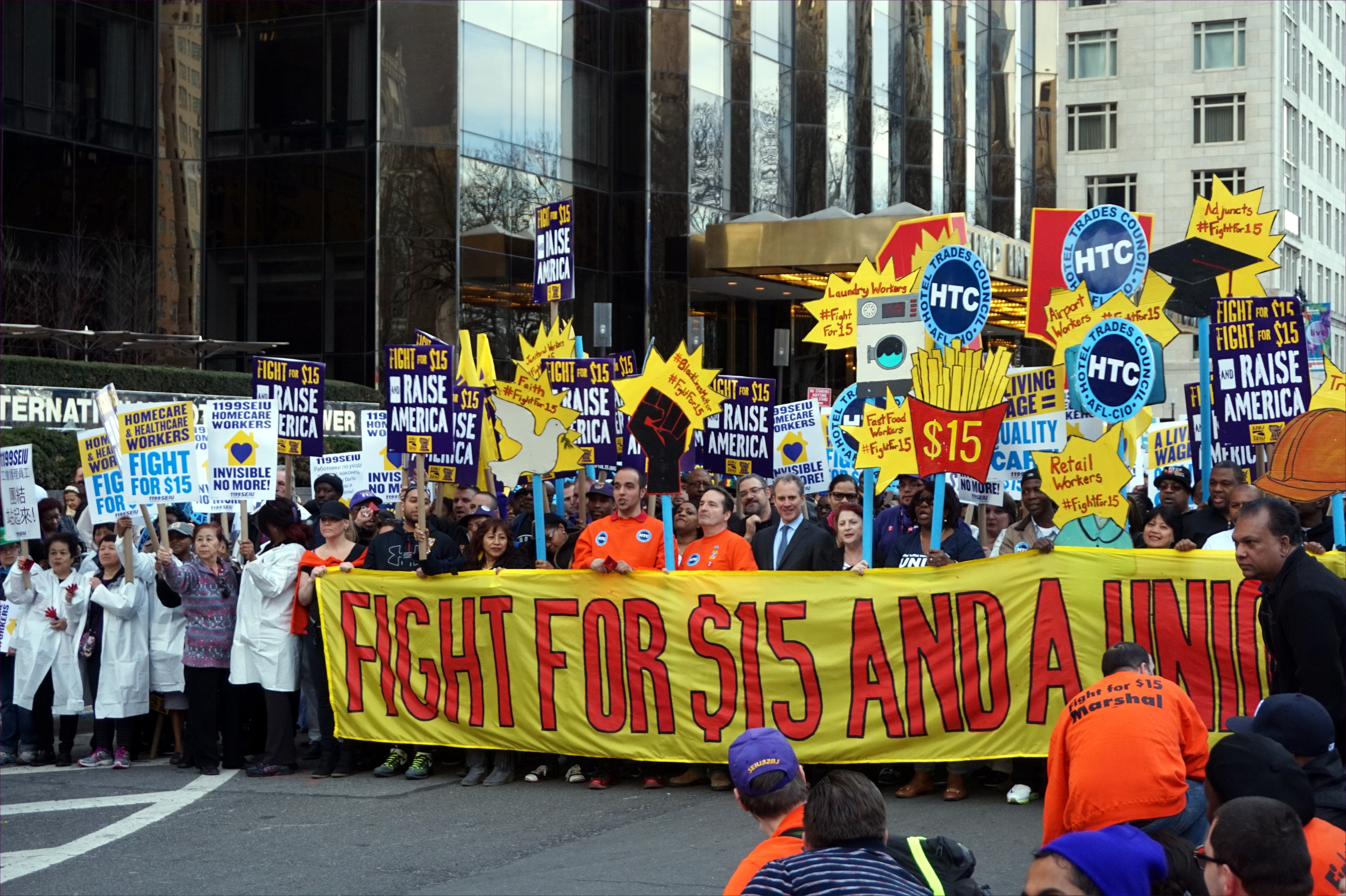
Protesters call for an increased legal minimum wage as part of the "Fight for $15" effort to require a $15 per hour minimum wage in 2015. A government-set minimum wage is a price floor on the price of labour.

A price floor is a government- or group-imposed price control or limit on how low a price can be charged for a product, good, commodity, or service. A price floor must be higher than the equilibrium price in order to be effective. The equilibrium price, commonly called the "market price", is the price where economic forces such as supply and demand are balanced and in the absence of external influences the (equilibrium) values of economic variables will not change, often described as the point at which quantity demanded and quantity supplied are equal (in a perfectly competitive market). Governments use price floors to keep certain prices from going too low. Two common price floors are minimum wage laws and supply management in Canadian agriculture. Other price floors include regulated US airfares prior to 1978 and minimum price per-drink laws for alcohol. Since the credibility revolution starting in the 1990s, minimum wages have often found strong support among economists.

Advantages of a price floor are:

- May motivate producers to produce more.
- May prevent the fluctuation of prices of agricultural products.
- May reduce the over-exploitation of producers.
- May reduce poverty and increase productivity among employees (in minimum wages)

Disadvantages of a price floor are:

- Supply may exceed demand.
- Resources may be wasted.
- The government may be forced to buy the excess supply or it may be discarded (e.g., in an agricultural context).

== Price ceiling ==
A related government intervention to price floor, which is also a price control, is the price ceiling; it sets the maximum price that can legally be charged for a good or service, with a common example being rent control. A price ceiling is a price control, or limit, on how high a price is charged for a product, commodity, or service. Governments use price ceilings to protect consumers from conditions that could make commodities prohibitively expensive. Such conditions can occur during periods of high inflation, in the event of an investment bubble, or in the event of monopoly ownership of a product, all of which can cause problems if imposed for a long period without controlled rationing, leading to shortages.

Further problems can occur if a government sets unrealistic price ceilings, causing business failures, stock crashes, or even economic crises. In fully unregulated market economies, price ceilings do not exist. While price ceilings are often imposed by governments, there are also price ceilings that are implemented by non-governmental organizations such as companies, such as the practice of resale price maintenance. With resale price maintenance, a manufacturer and its distributors agree that the distributors will sell the manufacturer's product at certain prices (resale price maintenance), at or below a price ceiling (maximum resale price maintenance) or at or above a price floor.

== Criticism ==
The primary criticism leveled against the price ceiling type of price controls is that by keeping prices artificially low, demand is increased to the point where supply cannot keep up, leading to shortages in the price-controlled product. For example, Lactantius wrote that Diocletian "by various taxes, he had made all things exceedingly expensive, attempted by a law to limit their prices. Then much blood [of merchants] was shed for trifles, men were afraid to offer anything for sale, and the scarcity became more excessive and grievous than ever. Until, in the end, the [price limit] law, after having proved destructive to many people, was from mere necessity abolished."

As with Diocletian's Edict on Maximum Prices, shortages lead to black markets where prices for the same good exceed those of an uncontrolled market. Furthermore, once controls are removed, prices will immediately increase, which can temporarily shock the economic system. Black markets flourish in most countries during wartime. States that are engaged in total war or other large-scale, extended wars often impose restrictions on home use of critical resources that are needed for the war effort, such as food, gasoline, rubber, metal, etc., typically through rationing. In most cases, a black market develops to supply rationed goods at exorbitant prices. The rationing and price controls enforced in many countries during World War II encouraged widespread black market activity. One source of black-market meat under wartime rationing was by farmers declaring fewer domestic animal births to the Ministry of Food than actually happened. Another in Britain was supplies from the US, intended only for use in US army bases on British land, but leaked into the local native British black market.

A classic example of how price controls cause shortages was during the Arab oil embargo between October 19, 1973, and March 17, 1974. Long lines of cars and trucks quickly appeared at retail gas stations in the U.S. and some stations closed because of a shortage of fuel at the low price set by the U.S. Cost of Living Council. The fixed price was below what the market would otherwise bear and, as a result, the inventory disappeared. It made no difference whether prices were voluntarily or involuntarily posted below the market clearing price. Scarcity resulted in either case. Price controls have been criticised as failing to achieve their proximate aim by some opponents of the policy or strategy, which is enacted to reduce prices paid by retail consumers, but such controls in certain circumstances may cause side effects which can reduce supply. Nobel Memorial Prize winner Milton Friedman said, "We economists don't know much, but we do know how to create a shortage. If you want to create a shortage of tomatoes, for example, just pass a law that retailers can't sell tomatoes for more than two cents per pound. Instantly you'll have a tomato shortage. It's the same with oil or gas."

U.S. President Richard Nixon's Secretary of the Treasury, George Shultz, enacting Nixon's "New Economic Policy", lifted price controls that had begun in 1971 (part of the "Nixon Shock"). This lifting of price controls resulted in a rapid increase in prices. Price freezes were re-established five months later. Stagflation was eventually ended in the United States when the Federal Reserve under chairman Paul Volcker raised interest rates to unusually high levels. This successfully ended high inflation but caused a recession that ended in the early 1980s.

== See also ==
- Administered prices
- Capital control
- Council on Wage and Price Stability
- Global energy crisis (2021–2023)
- Maximum retail price
- Monopsony
- Price ceiling
