= List of Princeton University people (United States Congress, Supreme Court, Continental Congress and Constitutional Convention) =

This list of people associated with Princeton University includes graduates who have served in the national government of the United States.

== Senate ==
The United States Senate is the upper house of Congress. Princetonians have a long history of service in the Senate. The Senate of the First Congress included three Princeton alumni (Oliver Ellsworth of Connecticut, William Paterson of New Jersey, and John Henry of Maryland), two more who attended Princeton but did not graduate (John Brown of Virginia, later Kentucky, and Benjamin Hawkins of North Carolina), and one Princeton trustee (Jonathan Elmer of New Jersey). Alexander Leitch wrote in 1978 of the Senate, "Since its establishment in 1789 it has been without a Princetonian only twenty years." This is still the case: Claiborne Pell served 1961–97, Kit Bond served 1987–2011, Jeff Merkley has served since 2009, and Ted Cruz has served since 2013. Princetonians have represented 26 of the 50 U.S. states in the Senate.

John Brown served in the Senate first from Virginia and then from Kentucky after its admission as a state. He is listed twice for convenience of sorting by state.

Name	Affiliation	State	Service	Notes	Refs
John Armstrong Jr.	Att	New York	1800–02, 1804	Minister to France, 1804–1810; minister to Spain, 1806; secretary of war, 1813–14	
David Baird Jr.	B 1903	New Jersey	1929–30		
W. Warren Barbour	Att	New Jersey	1931–37, 1938–43		
Dewey F. Bartlett	B 1942	Oklahoma	1973–79	Governor, 1967–71	
James A. Bayard	B 1784	Delaware	1804–13		
Richard H. Bayard	B 1814	Delaware	1836–39, 1841–45	Chargé d'affaires to Belgium, 1850–53	
John M. Berrien	B 1781	Georgia	1825–29, 1841–45, 1845–52	Attorney general, 1829–31	
Hiram Bingham III	F	Connecticut	1924–33	Credited with the discovery of Machu Picchu	
Francis Preston Blair Jr.	B 1841	Missouri	1871–73	Major general for the Union during the American Civil War	
Kit Bond	B 1960	Missouri	1987–2011	Governor, 1973–77, 1981–85	
Bill Bradley	B 1965	New Jersey	1979–97	NBA player, 1967–77; gold medalist in basketball in the 1964 Summer Olympics	
Daniel Brewster	Att 1942	Maryland	1963–69		
John Brown	Att	Virginia	1789–92	U.S. senator from Kentucky, 1792–1805; president pro tempore, 1803, 1804 (listed twice; see above)	
John Brown	Att	Kentucky	1792–1805	U.S. senator from Kentucky, 1789–92; president pro tempore, 1803, 1804 (listed twice; see above)	
Jacob Burnet	B 1791	Ohio	1828–31		
Aaron Burr	B 1772	New York	1791–97	Vice president of the United States, 1801–05	
J. Donald Cameron	B 1852	Pennsylvania	1877–97	Secretary of war, 1876–77; chairman of the Republican National Committee, 1880	
George W. Campbell	B 1794	Tennessee	1811–14, 1815–18	Secretary of the treasury, 1814; minister to Russia, 1818–21	
James Chesnut Jr.	B 1837	South Carolina	1858–60	Confederate brigadier general, 1864	
John E. Colhoun	B 1774	South Carolina	1801–02		
Alfred H. Colquitt	B 1844	Georgia	1883–94	Governor, 1876–80	
Walter T. Colquitt	Att	Georgia	1843–48	Congressman, 1839–49	
Ted Cruz	B 1992	Texas	2013–	Solicitor general of Texas, 2003–08	
Alfred Cuthbert	B 1803	Georgia	1835–43		
John Danforth	B 1958	Missouri	1976–95	Ambassador to the United Nations, 2004–05	
Jonathan Dayton	B 1776	New Jersey	1799–1805	U.S. House speaker, 1795–99	
William L. Dayton	B 1825	New Jersey	1842–51	Republican Party nominee for vice president, 1856; minister to France, 1861–64	
Mahlon Dickerson	B 1789	New Jersey	1817–33	Governor, 1815–17; secretary of the Navy, 1834–38	
James H. Duff	B 1904	Pennsylvania	1951–57	Governor, 1947–51	
John Foster Dulles	B 1908	New York	1949	Secretary of state, 1953–59	
Henry W. Edwards	B 1797	Connecticut	1823–27	Governor, 1833–34, 1835–38	
Oliver Ellsworth	B 1766	Connecticut	1789–96	Chief justice of the United States, 1796–1800; minister to France, 1799–1800	
Jonathan Elmer	T 1782–95	New Jersey	1789–91		
Richard Stockton Field	B 1821, F 1847	New Jersey	1862–63		
John Forsyth	B 1799	Georgia	1818–19, 1829–34	Governor, 1827–29; secretary of state, 1834–41	
Frederick Frelinghuysen	B 1770	New Jersey	1793–96		
Theodore Frelinghuysen	B 1804	New Jersey	1829–35	Whig Party candidate for vice president, 1844; president of Rutgers College, 1850–62	
Bill Frist	B 1974; T 1974–78, 1991–2001; F 2007–08	Tennessee	1995–2007	Senate majority leader, 2003–07	
Edward J. Gay	B 1901	Louisiana	1918–21		
William Branch Giles	B 1781	Virginia	1804–15	Governor, 1827–30	
George Gray	B 1859	Delaware	1885–99		
Joseph F. Guffey	Att 1890–91	Pennsylvania	1935–47		
John S. Hager	B 1836	California	1873–75		
Robert Goodloe Harper	B 1785	South Carolina	1816		
Benjamin Hawkins	Att	North Carolina	1789–95		
John Henry	B 1769	Maryland	1789–97	Governor, 1797–98	
Kaneaster Hodges Jr.	B 1960	Arkansas	1977–79		
Daniel Elliott Huger	B 1798	South Carolina	1843–45		
John L. M. Irby	Att	South Carolina	1891–97		
James Iredell	B 1806	North Carolina	1828–31		
Alfred Iverson Sr.	B 1820	Georgia	1855–61		
James K. Kelly	B 1839	Oregon	1871–77		
John F. Kennedy	Att 1935	Massachusetts	1953–60	President of the United States, 1961–63; U.S. representative, 1947–53	
Blair Lee I	B 1880	Maryland	1914–17		
Samuel Livermore	B 1752	New Hampshire	1793–1801	President pro tempore, 1796, 1799	
Edward Livingston	B 1781	Louisiana	1829–31	Mayor of New York City, 1801–03; secretary of state, 1831–33; ambassador to France, 1833–35	
George R. Lunn	GS	New York	1917–19		
Nathaniel Macon	B 1777	North Carolina	1815–28	President pro tem, 1826–27; U.S. representative from North Carolina, 1791–1815; speaker, 1801–07	
Alexander Martin	B 1756	North Carolina	1793–99	Acting governor, 1781–82; governor, 1782–84, 1789–92	
Jonathan Mason	B 1774	Massachusetts	1800–03		
David H. McCormick	MPA 1994 PHD 1996	Pennsylvania	2025–		
Jeff Merkley	MPA 1982	Oregon	2009–		
Arnold Naudain	B 1806	Delaware	1830–36		
Aaron Ogden	B 1773, T 1803–39	New Jersey	1802–03	Governor, 1812	
William Paterson	B 1763	New Jersey	1789–90	Governor, 1791–93; associate justice of the Supreme Court of the United States, 1793–1806	
James Pearce	B 1822	Maryland	1843–62		
Claiborne Pell	B 1940	Rhode Island	1961–97		
Atlee Pomerene	B 1884	Ohio	1911–23		
Thomas Pratt	Att	Maryland	1850–57	Governor of Maryland, 1845–48	
John Randolph	Att	Virginia	1825–27	Minister to Russia, 1830; co-founder of the American Colonization Society	
David A. Reed	B 1900	Pennsylvania	1922–35		
Thomas Buck Reed	Att	Mississippi	1826–27, 1829		
John Rutherfurd	B 1779	New Jersey	1791–98		
Paul Sarbanes	B 1954, T 2002–06	Maryland	1977–2007		
H. Alexander Smith	B 1901, F 1927–30	New Jersey	1944–59		
Samuel L. Southard	B 1804	New Jersey	1821–23, 1833–42	Secretary of the Navy, 1823–29; interim secretary of the treasury, 1825; interim secretary of war, 1828; governor, 1832–33	
John P. Stockton	B 1843	New Jersey	1865–66, 1869–75	U.S. ambassador to Italy, 1858–61	
Richard Stockton	B 1779	New Jersey	1796–99		
Robert F. Stockton	Att	New Jersey	1851–53	Officer in the Mexican–American War	
David Stone	B 1788	North Carolina	1801–07, 1813–14	Governor, 1808–10	
John Taylor	B 1790	South Carolina	1810–16	Governor, 1826–28	
John Renshaw Thomson	Att	New Jersey	1853–62		
Isaac Tichenor	B 1775	Vermont	1796–97, 1815–21	Governor, 1797–1807, 1808–09	
George Troup	B 1797	Georgia	1816–18, 1829–33	Governor, 1823–27	
Nicholas Van Dyke	B 1788	Delaware	1817–26		
Abraham B. Venable	B 1780	Virginia	1803–04		
John Williams Walker	B 1806	Alabama	1819–22	Inaugural U.S. senator	
James Walter Wall	B 1838	New Jersey	1863		
George H. Williams	B 1894	Missouri	1925–26		

== House of Representatives ==
The House of Representatives is the lower house of Congress. Princetonians have a long history of service in the House. Alexander Leitch noted in 1978 that the House "has not been without a Princeton alumnus in its membership in any year since it first met in 1789." As of 2015, this remains the case.

Princetonians have served 24 of the 50 U.S. states in the House. Two served as nonvoting delegates from Arkansas Territory and Michigan Territory before these territories became states.

Name	Affiliation	State	Service	Notes	Refs
Evan Alexander	B 1787	North Carolina	1806–09		
Bruce Alger	B 1940	Texas	1955–65		
Willis Alston	Att	North Carolina	1825–31		
Abram Andrew	B 1893, T 1932–36	Massachusetts	1921–26		
Arthur Glenn Andrews	B 1931	Alabama	1965–67		
Walter Gresham Andrews	B 1913, Football coach 1913–15	New York	1931–49		
John Archer	B 1760	Maryland	1801–07		
Stevenson Archer I	B 1805	Maryland	1811–17, 1819–21		
Stevenson Archer II	B 1848	Maryland	1867–75		
James Armstrong	Att	Pennsylvania	1793–95		
William Armstrong	B 1847	Pennsylvania	1869–71		
John Bacon	B 1765	Massachusetts	1801–03		
Alexander Bailey	B 1837	New York	1867–71		
Joseph Bailey	B 1915	Texas	1933–35		
David Bard	B 1773	Pennsylvania	1795–99, 1803–15		
James W. Bates	B 1807	Arkansas Territory	1819–23	Nonvoting delegate	
Thomas Bayly	B 1797	Maryland	1817–23		
Thomas M. Bayly	B 1794	Virginia	1813–15		
John Beatty	B 1769, T 1787–1802	New Jersey	1793–95		
Cleve Benedict	B 1959	West Virginia	1981–83		
Christopher Bergen	B 1863	New Jersey	1889–93		
Charles J. Biddle	B 1837	Pennsylvania	1861–63		
John Biddle	Att	Michigan Territory	1829–31	Nonvoting delegate	
Alexander Boteler	B 1835	Virginia	1859–61		
Elias Boudinot	T 1772–1821	New Jersey	1789–95	Director of the U.S. Mint, 1794–1805	
Thomas Fielder Bowie	Att	Maryland	1885–59		
Obadiah Bowne	Att 1838–40	New York	1851–53		
Lawrence Branch	B 1838	North Carolina	1855–61	Brigadier general in the Confederate Army	
James Broom	B 1794	Delaware	1805–07		
George Houston Brown	B 1828	New Jersey	1851–53		
Charles Browne	B 1896, AM 1900, F	New Jersey	1923–35	Mayor of Princeton, 1914–23	
Andrew Bruyn	B 1810	New York	1837–38		
Ken Buck	B 1980	Colorado	2015–24		
Chester Butler	B 1817	Pennsylvania	1847–50		
Jesse Bynum	Att 1818–19	North Carolina	1833–41		
Richard Carmichael	B 1828	Maryland	1833–35		
George Chambers	B 1804	Pennsylvania	1833–37		
William Chetwood	B 1792	New Jersey	1836–37		
James West Clark	B 1797	North Carolina	1815–17		
James M. Clarke	B 1939	North Carolina	1983–85, 1987–91		
Isaiah Clawson	B 1840	New Jersey	1855–59		
Hiester Clymer	B 1847	Pennsylvania	1873–81		
Edward Colston	B 1806	Virginia	1817–19		
Barnes Compton	B 1851	Maryland	1885–90, 1891–94		
Lewis Condict	T 1827–61	New Jersey	1811–17, 1821–33		
Silas Condit	B 1795	New Jersey	1831–33		
Joseph Cottman	Att 1821	Maryland	1851–53		
John Cowen	B 1866	Maryland	1895–97		
Thomas Crago	B 1893	Pennsylvania	1911–13, 1915–21, 1921–23		
Joseph H. Crane	Att	Ohio	1829–37		
Thomas Hartley Crawford	B 1804	Pennsylvania	1829–33		
George Crump	B 1805	Virginia	1826–27		
Elisha Cullen	Att	Delaware	1855–57		
John A. Cuthbert	B 1805	Georgia	1819–21		
Jonathan Dayton	B 1776	New Jersey	1791–99	Speaker, 1795–99; U.S. senator, 1799–1805	
William Dewart	B 1839	Pennsylvania	1857–59		
Samuel Eager	B 1809	New York	1830–31		
Henry W. Edwards	B 1797	Connecticut	1819–23	U.S. senator, 1823–27; governor, 1833–34, 1835–38	
Lucas Elmendorf	B 1782	New York	1797–1803		
James Everhart	B 1842	Pennsylvania	1883–87		
Michael Feighan	B 1927	Ohio	1943–71		
John Van Lear Findlay	B 1858	Maryland	1883–87		
Hubert Fisher	GS 1900–01	Tennessee	1917–31		
Vince Fong	MPA 2003	California	2024–		
Franklin Fort	B 1901	New Jersey	1925–31		
Samuel Fowler	Att	New Jersey	1889–93		
Peter Frelinghuysen	B 1938	New Jersey	1953–75		
Henry M. Fuller	B 1839	Pennsylvania	1851–53, 1855–57		
Joseph Gaines	B 1886	West Virginia	1901–11		
Mike Gallagher	B 2006	Wisconsin	2017–24		
Ralph Gamble	B 1909	New York	1937–57		
Robert S. Garnett	Att	Virginia	1817–27		
William Gaston	B 1796	North Carolina	1813–17		
Elmer Geran	B 1899	New Jersey	1923–25		
James Gholson	B 1820	Virginia	1833–35		
Richard Habersham	B 1810	Georgia	1839–42		
Charles Haight	B 1857	New Jersey	1867–71		
William Halstead	B 1812	New Jersey	1837–39, 1841–43	Elected but not seated, 1839–41	
James G. Hampton	B 1835	New Jersey	1845–49		
John A. Hanna	B 1782	Pennsylvania	1797–1805		
Robert G. Harper	B 1785	South Carolina	1795–1801	U.S. senator from Maryland, 1816	
Henry S. Harris	B 1870	New Jersey	1881–83		
Hal Haskell	Att 1940–42	Delaware	1957–59		
William Hayward Jr.	B 1808	Maryland	1823–25		
Nan Hayworth	B 1981	New York	2011–13		
Ken Hechler	F 1947–49	West Virginia	1959–77		
John Hinshaw	B 1916	California	1939–56		
George Holcombe	B 1805	New Jersey	1821–28		
Rush Holt	PPPL assistant director, 1989–97	New Jersey	1999–2015		
Benjamin C. Howard	B 1809	Maryland	1829–33, 1835–39		
Charles R. Howell	Att 1923–24	New Jersey	1949–55		
Nathaniel W. Howell	B 1788	New York	1813–15		
William Hudnut	B 1954	Indiana	1973–75	Mayor of Indianapolis, 1976–91	
James Imlay	B 1786	New Jersey	1797–1801		
Charles Jared Ingersoll	Att	Pennsylvania	1813–15, 1841–49		
Joseph Reed Ingersoll	B 1804	Pennsylvania	1835–37, 1841–49	Ambassador to the United Kingdom, 1852–53	
Glenn Ivey	B 1983	Maryland	2023–		
James M. Jackson	B 1845	West Virginia	1889–90		
Kensey Johns Jr.	B 1810	Delaware	1827–31		
James T. Jones	B 1852	Alabama	1877–79, 1883–89		
Seaborn Jones	Att	Georgia	1833–35, 1845–47		
Thomas Laurens Jones	B 1840	Kentucky	1867–71, 1875–77		
David S. Kaufman	B 1830	Texas	1846–51	Republic of Texas: House of Representatives, 1839–43; speaker, 1839–41; Senate, 1843–45; chargé d'affaires to the United States, 1845	
George Keim	Att	Pennsylvania	1838–43		
John F. Kennedy	Att 1935	Massachusetts	1947–53	President of the United States, 1961–63; U.S. senator, 1953–60	
Derek Kilmer	B 1996	Washington	2013–		
Littleton Kirkpatrick	B 1815	New Jersey	1843–45		
William Kirkpatrick	B 1788	New York	1807–09		
John Kittera	B 1776	Pennsylvania	1791–1801		
Raja Krishnamoorthi	B 1995	Illinois	2017–		
Leonard Lance	MPA 1982	New Jersey	2009–19		
Jim Leach	B 1964, T 2002–06, F 2007–09	Iowa	1977–2007	Chairman of the National Endowment for the Humanities, 2009–2013	
Mel Levine	MPA 1966	California	1983–93		
James Linn	B 1769	New Jersey	1799–1801		
Edward Livingston	B 1781	Louisiana	1823–29	U.S. secretary of state, 1831–33; mayor of New York City, 1801–03; U.S. senator, 1829–31; ambassador to France, 1833–35	
Robert Le Roy Livingston	B	New York	1809–12		
Clarence Long	AM 1935, PhD 1938	Maryland	1963–85		
Nathaniel Macon	B 1777	North Carolina	1791–1815	Speaker, 1801–07; U.S. senator, 1815–28; president pro tempore, 1826–27	
Patrick Magruder	Att	Maryland	1805–07	Librarian of Congress, 1807–15	
Alem Marr	B 1807	Pennsylvania	1829–31		
Jim Marshall	B 1972	Georgia	2003–11		
John Thomson Mason Jr.	B 1836	Maryland	1841–43		
George C. Maxwell	B 1792	New Jersey	1811–13		
John Patterson Bryan Maxwell	B 1823	New Jersey	1837–39, 1841–43	Elected but not seated, 1839–41	
George B. McClellan Jr.	B 1886, F	New York	1895–1903	Mayor of New York City, 1903–10	
Walter I. McCoy	B 1881	New Jersey	1911–14		
Welty McCullogh	B 1870	Pennsylvania	1887–89		
Joseph McKibbin	Att 1840–42	California	1857–59		
Stewart McKinney	Att 1949–51	Connecticut	1971–87		
Robert McKnight	B 1839	Pennsylvania	1859–63		
Charles F. Mercer	B 1797	Virginia	1817–39		
John J. Milligan	B 1814	Delaware	1831–39		
Samuel W. Morris	Att	Pennsylvania	1837–41		
Henry Nes	B 1824	Pennsylvania	1843–45, 1847–50		
Nathaniel Niles	B 1766	Vermont	1791–95		
John T. Nixon	B 1841	New Jersey	1859–63		
Edward Overton	B 1856	Pennsylvania	1877–81		
Richard W. Parker	B 1867	New Jersey	1895–1911, 1914–19, 1921–23		
John M. Patton	B 1816	Virginia	1830–38		
George Pearre	Att	Maryland	1899–1911		
Richmond Pearson	B 1872	North Carolina	1895–99, 1900–01	U.S. envoy to Persia, 1902–07; envoy to Greece and Montenegro, 1907–09	
William Pennington	B 1813	New Jersey	1859–61	Speaker, 1859–61; governor, 1837–43	
Charles E. Phelps	B 1852	Maryland	1865–69		
Isaac Pierson	B 1789	New Jersey	1827–31		
Otis Pike	B 1946	New York	1961–79		
Mahlon Pitney	B 1879	New Jersey	1895–99	Associate justice of the Supreme Court, 1912–22	
Jared Polis	B 1996	Colorado	2009–19	Governor of Colorado, 2019–	
Alfred H. Powell	B 1799	Virginia	1825–27		
L. Richardson Preyer	B 1941	North Carolina	1969–81		
John Randolph	Att	Virginia	1799–1813, 1815–17, 1819–25, 1827–29, 1833	U.S. senator, 1825–27; minister to Russia, 1830; co-founder of the American Colonization Society	
John Rhea	B 1780	Tennessee	1803–15, 1817–23		
William E. Richardson	B 1910	Pennsylvania	1933–37		
John J. Roane	Att	Virginia	1831–33		
Thomas Robinson Jr.	B 1823	Delaware	1839–41		
Robert F. Rockwell	B 1909	Colorado	1941–49		
George B. Rodney	B 1820	Delaware	1841–45		
Thomas Ross	B 1823	Pennsylvania	1849–53		
Tinsley Rucker	Att	Georgia	1917		
William Fitts Ryan	B 1947	New York	1961–72		
John Sarbanes	B 1984	Maryland	2007–		
John Scott	B 1805	Missouri	1816–17, 1817–21, 1821–27	Nonvoting delegate from Missouri Territory before August 10, 1821	
John A. Scudder	B 1775	New Jersey	1810–11		
John Sergeant	B 1795	Pennsylvania	1815–23, 1827–29, 1837–41	National Republican nominee for vice president of the United States, 1832	
Terri Sewell	B 1986	Alabama	2011–		
Alfred Sieminski	B 1934	New Jersey	1951–59		
Roger Slaughter	B 1928	Missouri	1943–47		
Isaac Smith	B 1755, F 1755–58	New Jersey	1795–97		
Peter Plympton Smith	B 1968	Vermont	1989–91		
William Stephens Smith	B 1774	New York	1813–15		
John Stanly	Att	North Carolina	1801–03, 1809–11		
John Stoddert	B 1810	Maryland	1833–35		
Michael Strang	B 1956	Colorado	1985–87		
John L. N. Stratton	B 1836	New Jersey	1859–63		
James Strawbridge	B 1844	Pennsylvania	1873–75		
John Augustus Swope	B 1847	Pennsylvania	1884–85, 1885–87		
Charles Talcott	B 1879	New York	1913–15		
Nathaniel G. Taylor	B 1840	Tennessee	1854–55, 1866–67		
Frederick Teese	B 1843	New Jersey	1875–77		
Thomas Telfair	B 1805	Georgia	1813–17		
George Toland	B 1816	Pennsylvania	1837–43		
Thomas Tredwell	B 1764	New York	1791–95		
Walter Tucker III	Att 1974–76	California	1993–95		
Jeremiah Van Rensselaer	B 1758	New York	1789–91		
Stephen Van Rensselaer	Att	New York	1822–29	Founder of Rensselaer Polytechnic Institute	
John Vanmeter	B 1821	Ohio	1843–45		
Abraham Watkins Venable	AM 1819	North Carolina	1847–53		
John Watmough	B 1811	Pennsylvania	1831–35		
Laurence Hawley Watres	B 1904	Pennsylvania	1923–31		
James Moore Wayne	B 1808	Georgia	1829–35	Associate justice of the Supreme Court, 1835–67	
Addison White	B 1844	Kentucky	1851–53		
Harry White	B 1854	Pennsylvania	1877–81		
William G. Whiteley	B 1838	Delaware	1857–61		
James W. Wilkin	B 1785	New York	1815–19		
Samuel J. Wilkin	B 1812	New York	1831–33		
Seward Williams	Att	Ohio	1915–17		
Ephraim Wilson	B 1790	Maryland	1827–31		
Ira W. Wood	B 1877	New Jersey	1904–13		
Silas Wood	B 1789	New York	1819–29		
Dudley Wooten	B 1875	Texas	1901–03		
John Wurts	B 1813	Pennsylvania	1825–27		
Ed Zschau	B 1961	California	1983–87		

== U.S. Supreme Court ==
The Supreme Court of the United States is the nation's highest court. Of the 112 justices to have served on the Supreme Court, 12 have been Princetonians. Three current justices are Princeton graduates. Oliver Ellsworth was the second chief justice of the United States; all others listed here were or are associate justices of the Supreme Court of the United States.

Name	Affiliation	Service	Notes	Refs
Samuel Alito	B 1972	2006–		
Peter V. Daniel	Att 1802–03	1842–60		
Oliver Ellsworth	B 1766	1796–1800	U.S. senator from Connecticut, 1789–96; minister to France, 1799–1800	
John Marshall Harlan	B 1920	1955–71		
William Johnson	B 1790	1804–34		
Elena Kagan	B 1981	2010–	Dean of Harvard Law School, 2003–09; solicitor general of the United States, 2009–10	
Henry Brockholst Livingston	B 1774	1807–23		
William Paterson	B 1763	1793–1806	U.S. senator from New Jersey, 1789–90; governor of New Jersey, 1791–93	
Mahlon Pitney	B 1879	1912–22	U.S. representative from New Jersey, 1895–99	
Sonia Sotomayor	B 1976, T 2007–11	2009–		
Smith Thompson	B 1788	1823–43	Secretary of the Navy, 1818–23	
James Moore Wayne	B 1808	1835–67		

== Continental Congress ==
The First Continental Congress met in Philadelphia in 1774 to plan the colonies' response to the punitive Intolerable Acts passed by the British Parliament earlier that year. When the Congress's appeal to the British government failed, the Second Continental Congress convened, again in Philadelphia. Meeting 1775–81, it issued the Declaration of Independence and was the provisional government of the United States during the Revolutionary War. It reorganized in 1781 following the adoption of the Articles of Confederation, under which it was known formally as the Congress of the Confederation. Between 1781 and 1789, this body met in several locations, including in Nassau Hall on the Princeton campus for about four months in 1783. It disbanded in 1789 following the ratification of the Constitution.

Princetonians represented each of the 13 states except Massachusetts in the Continental Congress. Four of them signed the Declaration of Independence; they are indicated by asterisks (*). Among them was John Witherspoon, a delegate from New Jersey and then the president of Princeton. Trained as a Presbyterian minister, Witherspoon was the only clergyman in the Continental Congress and served often as the body's chaplain. His experience on representative bodies in the ministry prepared him to be especially effective and influential in Congress, where he is said to have served on more committees than any other member.

Name	Affiliation	State	Service	Notes	Refs
John Armstrong Jr.	Att	Pennsylvania	1787–88	U.S. senator from New York, 1800–02, 1803–04; minister to France, 1804–10; minister to Spain, 1806; secretary of war, 1813–14	
John Beatty	B 1769, T 1787–1802	New Jersey	1784–85	U.S. representative, 1793–95	
Gunning Bedford	B 1771	Delaware	1783–85		
Elias Boudinot	T 1772–1821	New Jersey	1778, 1781–83	President of the Continental Congress, 1782–83; director of the U.S. Mint, 1795–1805	
William Burnet	B 1749	New Jersey	1780–81		
Jonathan Dayton	B 1776	New Jersey	1787–88	U.S. representative, 1791–99; speaker, 1795–99; U.S. senator, 1799–1805	
Pierpont Edwards	B 1768	Connecticut	1788		
Oliver Ellsworth	B 1766	Connecticut	1778–83	U.S. senator, 1789–96; chief justice of the United States, 1796–1800; minister to France, 1799–1800	
Jonathan Elmer	T 1782–95	New Jersey	1777–78, 1781–83, 1787–88	U.S. senator, 1789–91	
Frederick Frelinghuysen	B 1770	New Jersey	1779	U.S. senator, 1793–96	
John Habersham	Att	Georgia	1785		
Joseph Habersham	Att	Georgia	1785	U.S. Postmaster General, 1795–1801	
Benjamin Hawkins	Att	North Carolina	1781–83, 1787	U.S. senator, 1789–91, 1791–95	
John Henry	B 1769	Maryland	1778–80, 1785–86	U.S. senator, 1789–97; governor, 1797–98	
Joseph Hewes*	Att	North Carolina	1774–76		
William Houston	B 1768, F 1769–83	New Jersey	1775–76, 1779–81, 1784–85		
David Howell	B 1766	Rhode Island	1782–85		
Richard Hutson	B 1765	South Carolina	1778–79		
Henry "Lighthorse Harry" Lee III	B 1773, AM 1776	Virginia	1786–88	Governor, 1792–95; Revolutionary War cavalry officer	
Samuel Livermore	B 1752	New Hampshire	1780–82, 1785–86	U.S. senator, 1793–1801; president pro tempore, 1796, 1799	
Walter Livingston	B 1759	New York	1784–85		
James Madison	B 1771, Princeton's first GS	Virginia	1780–83, 1787–88	U.S. secretary of state, 1801–09; president of the United States, 1809–17; "father of the U.S. Constitution"	
James Manning	B 1762	Rhode Island	1786	Founder and first president of Brown University, 1764–91	
Joseph Montgomery	B 1755	Pennsylvania	1780–82		
David Ramsay	B 1765	South Carolina	1782–83, 1785–86	President pro tempore, 1785–86	
Nathaniel Ramsey	B 1767	Maryland	1786–87		
Joseph Reed	B 1757	Pennsylvania	1778	President of the Supreme Executive Council of Pennsylvania, 1778–81	
James Randolph Reid	B 1775	Pennsylvania	1787–89		
Jesse Root	B 1756	Connecticut	1778–82		
Benjamin Rumsey	Att	Maryland	1776–77		
Benjamin Rush*	B 1760	Pennsylvania	1776–77		
Nathaniel Scudder	B 1751, T 1778–81	New Jersey	1778–79		
Jonathan Dickinson Sergeant	B 1762	New Jersey	1776, 1776–77		
William Shippen	T 1765–96	Pennsylvania	1779–80	One of the founders of Princeton and UPenn	
Jonathan B. Smith	B 1760, T 1779–1808	Pennsylvania	1777–78		
Richard Stockton*	B 1748	New Jersey	1776		
John Witherspoon*	Pres 1768–94	New Jersey	1776–82		
Henry Wynkoop	B 1760	Pennsylvania	1779–82		

== Constitutional Convention ==
The impotence of the national government under the Articles of Confederation prompted the Constitutional Convention, which met in Philadelphia between 25 May and 17 September 1787. This assembly wrote the Constitution of the United States, which came into effect in 1789 after nine states had ratified it.

Princetonians represented six of the 12 states that sent delegations to the convention. (Rhode Island declined to send a delegation.) Ten of the 56 delegates were Princetonians, including four of the five delegates from New Jersey. This compares with five delegates each from the College of William & Mary and Yale College, three each from Harvard College and Columbia College, two from the University of Pennsylvania, and one each from the University of Oxford and the University of Glasgow.

James Madison was the first delegate to arrive at the convention and was so influential there that he came to be known as the "father of the Constitution". He also argued for the Constitution's ratification in The Federalist Papers, written together with Alexander Hamilton and John Jay. As a representative in the 1st United States Congress, he introduced the Bill of Rights, which became the first ten Amendments to the Constitution.

William Paterson and Oliver Ellsworth were also influential at the convention. In response to Madison's Virginia Plan, under which states would be represented in Congress in proportion to their population and taxes paid, Paterson authored the New Jersey Plan, which called for equal representation for each state. Together with his Connecticut colleague Roger Sherman, Ellsworth crafted the Connecticut Compromise, also called the Great Compromise, which blended the two plans. This plan, which specified a bicameral legislature with one house apportioned by population and the other in which the states would be represented equally, became the basis for the House of Representatives and Senate in the final Constitution.

Signers of the Constitution are indicated with asterisks (*).

Name	Affiliation	State	Notes	Refs
Gunning Bedford*	B 1771	Delaware		
David Brearley*	Att	New Jersey		
William Richardson Davie	B 1776	North Carolina	Governor, 1798–99	
Jonathan Dayton*	B 1776	New Jersey	U.S. representative, 1791–99; speaker, 1795–99; U.S. senator, 1799–1805	
Oliver Ellsworth	B 1766	Connecticut	U.S. senator, 1789–96; chief justice of the United States, 1796–1800; minister to France, 1799–1800	
William Houston	B 1768, F 1769–83	New Jersey		
James Madison*	B 1771, Princeton's first GS	Virginia	Secretary of state, 1801–09; president of the United States, 1809–17	
Alexander Martin	B 1756	North Carolina	Acting governor, 1781–82; governor, 1782–84, 1789–92; U.S. senator, 1793–99	
Luther Martin	B 1766	Maryland		
William Paterson*	B 1763	New Jersey	U.S. senator, 1789–90; governor, 1791–93; associate justice of the Supreme Court, 1793–1806	

== See also ==
- List of Princeton University people
- List of Princeton University people (government)
