= Alfred E. Kahn =

American economist (1917–2010)

- Born: October 17, 1917; Paterson, New Jersey, U.S.
- Died: December 27, 2010 (aged 93); Ithaca, New York, U.S.

Academic background
- Education: New York University (BA); Yale University (PhD)

Academic work
- Institutions: Cornell University

Alfred Edward Kahn (October 17, 1917 – December 27, 2010) was an American economist and political advisor who specialized in regulation and deregulation. He was an important influence in the deregulation of the airline and energy industries. Commonly known as the "Father of Airline Deregulation," he chaired the Civil Aeronautics Board during the period when it ended its regulation of the airline industry, paving the way for low-cost airlines, from People Express to Southwest Airlines.

He was the Robert Julius Thorne Professor Emeritus of political economy at Cornell University.

== Biography ==
Kahn was born in Paterson, New Jersey, on October 17, 1917, to parents Jacob and Bertha Kahn. His father, a Russian Jewish immigrant, worked in a silk mill. Kahn graduated from high school at 15 and New York University at 18, summa cum laude (highest average in his graduating class). He earned his doctorate in economics from Yale University in 1942 after graduate study at NYU and the University of Missouri.

Before World War II, he also worked for policy research organizations and government agencies in Washington, including the Brookings Institution and the antitrust division of the U.S. Justice Department. After serving in the United States Army, he became Chairman of the Department of Economics at Ripon College.

He moved to Cornell University in 1947, where he served as chairman emeritus of the Department of Economics (a position he held for the rest of his life), as a member of the Board of Trustees of the university and as Dean of the College of Arts and Sciences. In 1974, he became chairman of the New York Public Service Commission, and later served as Chairman of the Civil Aeronautics Board, Advisor to the President on Inflation under Jimmy Carter, and Chairman of the Council on Wage and Price Stability, Carter's "inflation czar," until 1980.

While serving under Carter, Kahn became known for his blunt and sometimes politically damaging comments. Convinced that certain administration policies would lead to a depression, but having been chided for using the term, he began saying that the economy would "become a banana." After banana producers objected, he changed his euphemism to "kumquat". He explained inflation in one press conference by saying "Inflation occurs when everyone is trying to take a piece of the pie, but there isn't enough pie to go around." While President Carter tried to downplay the significance of certain economic figures, Kahn called them "a catastrophe." At one point, a frustrated Kahn offered his resignation, but Carter refused. Kahn joked, "I don't know why the president doesn't fire me. Actually, I do. There's no one else foolish enough to take this job."

He served on many private boards on commissions addressing regulated and deregulating industries such as electricity, telecommunications, and transportation. He also received numerous awards for his work in economics, regulation, and deregulation. A seminar room in the Lincoln Hall Music Library of Cornell University is named in his honor. He also maintained a long relationship with NERA Economic Consulting (formerly National Economic Research Associates). In 1982, he was elected to the Common Cause National Governing Board.

In addition to his professorship at Cornell, Kahn sang baritone in university productions of Gilbert and Sullivan operettas from 1964 until retiring from the stage in 2000; he did a particularly fine turn as the Lord Chancellor in Iolanthe in the early 1970s. He was badly injured in a 2003 car crash, and endowed the New York hospital that saved him with funds to set up a camera traffic-surveillance system so that emergency-room doctors could view the accidents that injured their patients.

Kahn remained completely convinced that deregulating the airlines was a success. When a friend complained that increased numbers of passengers on flights resulted in him sitting next to "a filthy hippie" on a plane, he replied, "Since I haven't heard from the hippie, I can assume the distaste wasn't reciprocated." In 2008, the nonagenarian Kahn gave a speech to the Global Airport International Summit in Boston where he said, "The industry in the last 30 years gave the public something it had not received before: high quality, space, and low cost. It catered to a variety of demands and abilities today so that we had an enormous spread of fares. It offered the people upgrades such as business class and frequent flyer miles." Admitting that he was no expert on airplanes or the fine details of the industry, Kahn once said "I can't tell one plane from the other. To me, they're all just marginal costs with wings."

Kahn was the father-in-law of Daniel Mark Fogel, president of the University of Vermont.

Professor Kahn died of cancer in Ithaca, New York at the age of 93, on December 27, 2010.

== Work in deregulation ==
Kahn was a leading exponent of marginal-cost theory. In 1974, he was appointed chair of the New York Public Service Commission, which regulated electric, gas, telephone and water companies.

While serving as Chairman of the Civil Aeronautics Board (CAB), which regulated commercial airline fares, in 1977–1978, Kahn (a self-described "good liberal Democrat") oversaw the deregulation of commercial air fares. As one analyst put it, Kahn "set to work with … other progressives" including Senator Edward Kennedy, future Supreme Court Justice Stephen Breyer, and consumer advocate Ralph Nader to "dismantle anti-consumer cartels that had been sustained by government regulation." The CAB was abolished on January 1, 1985, and its remaining functions were transferred to the Department of Justice, the U.S. Postal Service, and the Department of Transportation.

He consistently argued that, where feasible, complete deregulation is preferable to partial deregulation. "The verdict of the great majority of economists would, I believe, be that deregulation has been a success — bearing in mind, as always, the central argument … that society's choices are always between or among imperfect systems, but that, wherever it seems likely to be effective, even very imperfect competition is preferable to regulation …. Recent experience clearly suggests, instead, that the mixed system may be the worst of both possible worlds."

In an interview with USA Today, he said he wished he could have deregulated the telecommunications industry.

He served as an expert witness in many regulatory matters, particularly in issues regarding flat rate pricing for telecommunications, marginal costing in both telecommunications and electricity, and net neutrality. After his death, The Economist wrote:

And though, being an economist, he could not help muttering about the imperfection of societies and systems and the absurdity of predictions — and though, being an inveterate puncturer of himself, he would demand a paternity test if anyone called him the father of the deregulated world — his adventures with airlines led on to the freeing of the trucking, telecoms and power industries, and heralded the Thatcherite and Reaganite revolutions.

== Published works ==
Kahn was the author of numerous books, including The Economics of Regulation: Principles and Institutions, Lessons from Deregulation: Telecommunications and Airlines After the Crunch, Whom the Gods Would Destroy, or How Not to Deregulate, Letting Go: Deregulating the Process of Deregulation, and Great Britain in the World Economy. Kahn also authored many articles, and was for many years a commentator on PBS's The Nightly Business Report.

Besides his love for numbers, Kahn also loved words, and "hated to see them misused." Even after his death, he was acknowledged as "a champion of plain English...an economist who could do without 'herein' and 'therein'."

== Awards ==
- L. Welch Pogue Award for Lifetime Achievement in Aviation, 1997
