= National Board for Prices and Incomes =

Former UK government policy

Advisory board overview
- Formed: July 1966
- Dissolved: 1970
- Superseding agencies: Price Commission; Pay Board
- Advisory board executive: Aubrey Jones, Chairman

The National Board for Prices and Incomes was created by the government of Harold Wilson in 1965 in an attempt to solve the problem of inflation in the British economy by managing wages and prices.

The board's chairman was Aubrey Jones, formerly a Conservative MP, who resigned his seat to take the position. Amongst the other members was the academic Hugh Clegg.

The board's initial topics, given by the government, were to deal with the pricing of soap, bread and road haulage. Its first report (July 1965) attacked price-fixing by the British Road Haulage Association. The association's combative response was to prove a typical reaction to most of the board's findings throughout its existence. Recommendations on wages were no more effective, especially as the Transport and General Workers Union was opposed from an early stage to the government's attempts at wage control. From 1966 onwards, the government introduced a series of Prices and Incomes Orders to limit price and wage increases by law. This was in effect the end of the voluntary policy which had been envisaged. George Brown, the Secretary of State for Economic Affairs responsible for the board, was moved later that year to become Foreign Secretary.

With the failure of Brown's national economic plans and especially after devaluation in 1967, wage control was more consistently opposed by British trades unions, and eventually in 1970, Wilson proposed to merge the board with the Monopolies Commission, with Jones at its head. In the event the 1970 general election, was won by the Conservatives, who scrapped the organization. Clegg wrote a book on his experience entitled How to Run an Incomes Policy, and Why We Made Such a Mess of the Last One. Subsequently, in 1972, the Conservative government of Edward Heath revived the idea with a Price Commission and a Pay Board, which were similarly unpopular, but the Price Commission was retained (and the Pay Board abolished) by the returning Wilson government in 1974.

== See also ==
- Price controls
- Incomes policy
- Prices and Incomes Act 1966
