= Albert Rees =

American economist (1921–1992)

Albert E. Rees
- Born: August 21, 1921; New York City, US
- Died: September 5, 1992 (aged 71); University Medical Center of Princeton
- Occupations: U.S. presidential advisor to Gerald Ford; U.S. Federal Agency Head non-profit CEO; Provost department chair professor author
- Employer(s): White House; Alfred P. Sloan Foundation; Princeton; University of Chicago
- Political party: Democratic
- Spouses: Candida Kranold Rees (1945–1963); Marianne Rees (1963–1992 (his death))
- Children: 3

Academic background
- Education: University of Chicago (Ph.D.); Oberlin College
- Thesis: "The effect of collective bargaining on wage and price levels in the basic steel and bituminous coal industries, 1945-1948" (1950)
- Doctoral advisor: Frederick H. Harbison; H. Gregg Lewis

Academic work
- Discipline: Labor economics
- School or tradition: Chicago school of economics
- Institutions: Princeton; University of Chicago
- Doctoral students: Walter Oi; Orley Ashenfelter; Ronald Oaxaca
- Notable students: James Heckman
- Notable works: Landmark labor study with George P. Shultz; Economics of Work and Pay
- Awards: American Academy of Arts and Sciences; Guggenheim
- Website: http://library.duke.edu/rubenstein/findingaids/rees/

Council on Wage and Price Stability
- CoWPS

Agency overview
- Formed: 1974
- Preceding agency: Pay Board and Price Commission
- Dissolved: 1981
- Superseding agencies: Office of Information and Regulatory Affairs; Council of Economic Advisors; National Labor Relations Board
- Headquarters: Washington, D.C.
- Agency executives: Albert Rees; Alfred E. Kahn
- Parent agency: Executive Office of the President

Albert E. Rees (August 21, 1921 – September 5, 1992) was an American economist and noted author. An influential labor economist, Rees taught at Princeton University from 1966 to 1979, while also being an advisor to President Gerald Ford. He was also a former Provost of Princeton and former president of the Alfred P. Sloan Foundation. He was also the first head of the Council on Wage and Price Stability, a short-lived federal agency.

== Discussion ==
Born in New York City, Rees earned his bachelor's degree from Oberlin College in 1943. He later received his master's degree and his doctorate in economics from the University of Chicago. After obtaining his Ph.D. in 1950, he went on to chair the economics department at Chicago from 1962 to 1966 before moving to Princeton as economics chair there. He later co-authored a landmark labor study with George P. Shultz. Another notable book, The Economics of Work and Pay, remained in print for two decades over at least six editions at HarperCollins. Notable doctoral students at Princeton included the future Nobel Laureate James Heckman. He won many awards, including a Guggenheim Fellowship in 1969 and election to the American Academy of Arts and Sciences in 1971. Rees died on September 5, 1992, at University Medical Center of Princeton.

Since 1997, Princeton University awards the "Albert Rees Prize" for an outstanding dissertation in labor economics. Oberlin College has also established multiple Albert Rees prizes, including a Fellowship and an Assistantship. Duke University Libraries has a special collection with his papers. Additional special collections at George Mason University Libraries and the Ford Presidential Library house archives for the Council on Wage and Price Stability, of which he was the founding director.

== Council on Wage and Price Stability ==
The Council on Wage and Price Stability (COWPS or CWPS) Act was signed into law by President Ford in 1974, with Rees as the new agency's first head. It replaced the formal price controls from the Nixon administration authorized under its precursor, the Economic Stabilization Act of 1970 and its related agency, the Pay Board and Price Commission. The council continued under President Carter, with Alfred E. Kahn replacing Rees as its head under the new administration. When Ronald Reagan took office in 1981, CWPS economists moved to the newly formed Office of Information and Regulatory Affairs. Some labor and economic regulator responsibilities merged back into their historic homes with the National Labor Relations Board and the Council of Economic Advisors.

== Selected publications ==
- Rees, Albert (June 1, 1973). Economics of Work and Pay (1 ed.). New York: Joanna Cotler Books. ISBN 9780060453534.
- The Economics of Work and Pay (6 ed.). New York: Harpercollins College Div. June 1, 1996. ISBN 9780673994745.
- Rees, Albert; Shultz, George (1970). Workers and wages in an urban labor market. Chicago: University of Chicago Press. ISBN 0226707059. OCLC 121075.
- Rees, Albert (1984). Striking a Balance: Making National Economic Policy. Chicago: University of Chicago Press. ISBN 978-0226707075.
- Rees, Albert (1962). The Economics of Trade Unions. Chicago: University of Chicago Press. ISBN 978-0720202632.

== Archives ==
- "Guide to the Albert Rees Papers, 1966-1992 and undated". David M. Rubenstein Rare Book & Manuscript Library.
- "Council on Wage & Price Stability — A Project of the Mercatus Center at George Mason University". cowps.mercatus.org.
- "Ron Nessen Papers at Ford Presidential Library" (PDF). Ford Presidential Library.

== See also ==
- List of Guggenheim Fellowships awarded in 1969
- List of Princeton University people (government)
- List of Princeton University people
- List of University of Chicago faculty
- List of University of Chicago alumni
- List of Oberlin College and Conservatory people
