= Economic Stabilization Act of 1970 =

US federal law concerning price controls

- Long title: An Act to amend the Defense Production Act of 1950, and for other purposes.
- Enacted by: the 91st United States Congress

Citations
- Public law: Pub. L. 91-379
- Statutes at Large: 84 Stat. 799

Legislative history
- Introduced in the House as H.R. 17880 by Wright Patman on May 27, 1970; Signed into law by President Richard Nixon on August 15, 1970

Pay Board and Price Commission
Agency overview
- Formed: 1970
- Preceding agencies: related earlier agencies: National Labor Relations Board; Wage Stabilization Board (Korean War); Office of Price Administration (World War II); Office of Price Stabilization (Korean War); Council of Economic Advisors (price board during Kennedy era); Cost of Living Council (Nixon Administration)
- Dissolved: 1974
- Superseding agency: Council on Wage and Price Stability
- Headquarters: Washington, D.C.
- Parent agency: Executive Office of the President

The Economic Stabilization Act of 1970 (Title II of Pub. L. 91–379, 84 Stat. 799, enacted August 15, 1970, formerly codified at 12 U.S.C. § 1904) was a United States law that authorized the President to stabilize prices, rents, wages, salaries, interest rates, dividends and similar transfers as part of a general program of price controls within the American domestic goods and labor markets. It established standards to serve as a guide for determining levels of wages, prices, etc., which would allow for adjustments, exceptions and variations to prevent inequities, taking into account changes in productivity, cost of living and other pertinent factors.

The Pay Board and the Price Commission were created on October 22, 1971, when President Nixon appointed 22 members between the boards, as agencies to create and administer economic controls in Phase II of the Economic Stabilization Program (ESP), with Donald Rumsfeld newly acting as the executive director of the Cost of Living Council responsible for establishing the overall goals of Phases I and II of the ESP.

Under the authority of the act, as amended, on August 16, 1971 President Nixon declared goals of combating inflation, reducing unemployment and curbing domestic consumption of foreign goods by imposing a 10% surcharge tax on all dutiable imports.

== Background ==
The nation was in recession, attributed to the Vietnam War combined with workforce shortages and the rise in healthcare cost. Nixon inherited high inflation, but unemployment was low. Seeking reelection in the 1972 presidential race, Nixon vowed to fight inflation and acknowledged that it would result in job losses but proposed that it was a temporary solution and promised that more was to come in terms of change, hope and "manpower".

The Economic Stabilization Act of 1970 was passed, inaugurating a policy of wage and price controls. Nixon wrote to Congress:

"Our tactics for pursuing this objective are twofold: First, to accomplish much needed and long overdue reform of the manpower programs set up under the Manpower Development and Training Act and subsequent legislation and thus increase their effectiveness in enhancing the employability of jobless workers; and, second, to move toward a broader national manpower policy which will be an important adjunct of economic policy in achieving our Nation's economic and social objectives".

Nixon commented on the futile attempts to contain the economy in the 1960s and promised to bring about change by proposing tax cuts over the course of his term to create new jobs. In 1971, Nixon proceeded with the tax cuts under the provisions of phase II of the Economic Stabilization Act as it was amended earlier that year. Nixon believed America needed a comprehensive manpower policy to reinvigorate the economy. Nixon and the proposed Act cited the Manpower Development and Training act of 1962 to use the competence of America's workforce and the Manpower Revenue Sharing Act to make training programs accessible to local governments.

== Duties and obligations ==
The Act provided for limitations on the exercise of presidential authority and allowed delegation of the performance of any of the president's functions to appropriate officers, departments and agencies of the United States or to entities composed of members appointed to represent different sectors of the economy and the general public.

The Act provided for disclosure of information, subpoena power, administrative procedure, criminal and civil sanctions, injunctions and suits for damages and other relief. The Act specified original jurisdiction for judicial review of cases or controversies arising under the Act or regulations issued thereunder in the district courts of the United States and directed appeals of final decisions or permitted interlocutory appeals to be brought in the United States Court of Appeals for the Federal Circuit.

== Public benefits ==
This act had special provisions, some of which increased the employment opportunities for minorities, under the local manpower programs. The programs completed two tasks in one. Firstly, the program, in addition to providing an equal opportunity for minorities under the Economic Stabilization Act, which led to the Equal Employment Opportunity Act, which created opportunities for those who were unemployed and "transitional" jobs for those who lost jobs. Secondly, the program fulfilled the "unmet needs" for public assistance.

The Secretary of Energy under "power vested" by the Act had to submit quarterly reports to the United States Congress, in conjunction with the provisions of the Emergency Petroleum Allocation Act of 1973, to ensure the best prices for fuel in the country. The Public did not just benefit from initiatives made in the workforce. In the attempt to save social security from suffering from the effects of the inflation, Supplemental Security Income was established to provide unemployed Americans with a cushion. Since Nixon decoupled the dollar from the gold standard, the dollar price of imports increased. The cost of imports allowed Americans to focus on American-made products to keep the money circulating throughout the American economy, resulting in a higher income for American workers.

To lull the anxieties of unemployment and the anxieties about the promises of the Economic Stabilization Act in conjunction with bettering public service, Nixon signed the Emergency Employment Act in 1971, which made specific provision for small businesses and created nearly "150,000 new jobs" in the "public sphere" in such fields as "education, environmental protection, law enforcement, and other 'public works'". The most prominent public work was mass transportation systems. The Act, like the earlier Economic Stabilization Act, required the President to issue periodic reports on all appropriations to Congress.

Under the Act, Congress convened to tackle the issue of rapid economic growth in metropolises and other urban environments. The goal was to provide efficient living for people living in these settings and also to condense densely populated areas. The Housing and Urban Development department was established to provide good living and "attractive living environments" for these tenants and to conserve the energy and resources that are used in heavily populated urban areas. This Act provided people with low income with subsidized rent for affordable housing in privately owned buildings, the "predecessor to the Section 8 rental subsidies".

== Court challenge ==
In the case of Amalgamated Meat Cutters v. Connally, 337 F. Supp. 737 (D.D.C. 1971)., the Amalgamated Meat Cutters sued defendant John B. Connally, the chairman of the Cost of Living Council and US Treasury Secretary. The Amalgamated Meat Cutters used two arguments, which were condensed into one, when they approached the court. Their primary concern was pursuing a twenty-five cent an hour increase on general wages.

It was argued by them that it was an agreement that was reached in April 1970 and demanded for the wage increase to take effect on September 6, 1971. Their second argument was that the Act was "unconstitutional and the Executive Order was invalid" because one of the stipulations of the Act was that "prices, rent, wages and salaries shall be stabilized for a period of 90-days", as stated by Nixon.

That was the salient argument because it was the first time that the Act was opposed and the executive order was being questioned since the union believed that the order did not do justice to the workers under unions and that the Act imposed on the power of the unions since they had to operate under a 90-day spending freeze. The freeze did not allow unions to protect the union workers, largely since the Pay Board and Price Commission, under the Act and the Executive Order, both monitored and controlled wages.

The United States District Court for the District of Columbia upheld the act and rejected an argument that it was an unconstitutional delegation of legislative authority by citing previous cases such as Beacon Theatres, Inc. v. Westover, 359 U.S. 500, 507 (1959) for the "government's contention of adequacy of law" and Field v. Clark, 143 U.S. 649, 692-693 (1892) for the "permissibility of legislative power within the Government's limits". Many other cases were cited by the defense, all of which proved the legitimacy and the flexibility of the Act and the government's authority and range to enforce it.

== Administrative history ==
Under a provision in the Act, the Cost of Living Council was established as an independent agency. Its purpose was to stabilize prices, rent, wages and salaries higher than prices on or before May 25, 1970 and to execute phases II-IV of the Economic Stabilization Program set in place to ensure the success of this program. Phase I was the 90-day price and wage freeze that was authorized by Nixon, who delegated power to the Office of Emergency Preparedness, which acted as the fiduciary agency that monitored business practices. Phase II required the Cost of Living Council to engage in wage and price controls. Phase III required the council to enforce another price freeze to balance out economy. Phase IV was a "voluntary compliance and gradual decontrol;" the council had to ease off the businesses and relinquish some control. By April 30, 1974, the council was "abolished".

Having the responsibility of chairman of first the Office of Economic Opportunity and then the Cost of Living Council imposed on him, Donald Rumsfeld was initially unhappy with his position as chairman of the council and its "success" and, for a while, opposed its idea. He soon realized that his presence there would "be best" for his influence in both domestic and international commerce and appeared satisfied with the council prior to it being abolished in 1974. Nixon reported that "public support and cooperation" was there for the council when it was making the tough decisions, and he also assured the American people that the Cost of Living Council always "kept the public interest in mind".

The president, in his quarterly statements, usually claimed that Rumsfeld and his council were doing a great job in "providing encouraging evidence that the nation continues to make progress in the battle against inflation". Nixon continued to say in his report, "The national economy is now expanding significantly. This makes the success of the stabilization program more important than ever."

In 1971, Nixon announced he had signed the Revenue Act of 1971, an amendment to the Economic Stabilization Act, which, according to Nixon, was to provide "tax cuts of some $15 billion over the next 3 years to stimulate the economy and provide hundreds of thousands of new jobs". The program was allowed to expire in 1974 and was viewed as a success by the president.

== Archives ==
- "Records of the Economic Stabilization Program".

== See also ==
- Nixon shock
- Council on Wage and Price Stability
- Peter F. Carpenter
