= List of Princeton University people (government) =

== Politics and government ==
=== Heads of state and government ===
Four presidents of the United States have had connections to Princeton. Princeton alumni and former students have served as heads of government in Bangladesh, Belgium, New South Wales (Australia), Peru, Senegal, and South Korea.

Name	Affiliation	Notability	Refs
Fakhruddin Ahmed	PhD 1975	Chief advisor of the caretaker government (interim prime minister) of Bangladesh, 2007–09; governor of Bangladesh Bank, 2001–05	
Chung Un-chan	PhD 1978	Prime minister of South Korea, 2009–10	
Grover Cleveland	F 1899–1908, T 1901–08	22nd and 24th president of the United States, 1885–89, 1893–97; governor of New York, 1883–85	
John F. Kennedy	Att 1935	35th president of the United States, 1961–63; U.S. senator from Massachusetts, 1953–60; U.S. Navy officer during World War II	
Pedro Pablo Kuczynski	MPA 1961	66th president of Peru, 2016–2018; prime minister of Peru, 2005–06; deputy director-general of the Central Reserve Bank of Peru, 1967–69; minister of Energy and Mines, 1980–82; minister of Economy and Finance, 2001–02, 2004–05	
James Madison	B 1771, Princeton's first GS	Fourth president of the United States, 1809–17; secretary of state, 1801–09; "father of the U.S. Constitution"	
Chris Minns	MPP 2013	47th premier of New South Wales, 2023–	
Syngman Rhee	PhD 1910	First president of South Korea, 1948–60	
Idrissa Seck	Att	Prime minister of Senegal, 2002–04	
Woodrow Wilson	B 1879, Pres 1902–10	28th president of the United States, 1913–21; governor of New Jersey, 1911–13	
Paul van Zeeland	PhD 1921	Prime minister of Belgium, 1936–37	

=== Vice presidents ===
Three vice presidents of the United States and one vice-president of Kenya have attended Princeton.

Name	Affiliation	Notability	Refs
John C. Breckinridge	Att	Vice president of the United States, 1857–61; U.S. senator from Kentucky, 1861; Confederate States secretary of war, 1865	
Aaron Burr	B 1772	Vice president of the United States, 1801–05; U.S. senator from New York, 1791–97	
George M. Dallas	B 1810	Vice president of the United States, 1845–49; U.S. senator from Pennsylvania, 1831–33; ambassador to Russia, 1837–39; ambassador to the United Kingdom, 1856–61	
Josephat Karanja	PhD 1962	Vice-president of Kenya, 1988–89	

=== Cabinet members and senior ministers ===
This lists cabinet members and other senior ministers to national governments. Most associated with Princeton have been members of the cabinet of the United States, but Princetonians have also served in the cabinets of Canada, Colombia, Costa Rica, Germany, Greece, Haiti, Mexico, the Netherlands, Saudi Arabia, South Africa, and Turkey. John C. Breckinridge served in the Cabinet of the Confederate States of America, the nation proclaimed by the rebelling Southern states during the American Civil War.

Name	Affiliation	Notability	Refs
John Armstrong Jr.	Att	U.S. secretary of war, 1813–14; U.S. senator from New York, 1800–02, 1804; minister to France, 1804–10; minister to Spain, 1806	
Lloyd Axworthy	AM 1963, PhD 1972	Minister of Foreign Affairs of Canada, 1996–2000	
Jean-Claude Bajeux	PhD 1977	Minister of Culture of Haiti, 1994–95	
James Baker	B 1952	White House chief of staff, 1981–85, 1992–93; U.S. secretary of the treasury, 1985–88; secretary of state, 1989–92	
William Belknap	B 1848	U.S. secretary of war, 1869–76	
Ben Bernanke	F 1985–2002	Chair of the U.S. Council of Economic Advisors, 2005–06; chairman of the Federal Reserve, 2006–; member of the Federal Reserve Board, 2002–05	
John Macpherson Berrien	B 1781	U.S. attorney general, 1829–31; U.S. senator from Georgia, 1825–29, 1841–45, 1845–52	
George Bibb	B 1792	U.S. secretary of the treasury, 1844–45	
W. Michael Blumenthal	MPA, AM, PhD, F 1954–57, T	U.S. secretary of the treasury, 1977–79	
Joshua Bolten	B 1976, F 2009–	U.S. Office of Management and Budget director, 2003–06; White House chief of staff, 2006–09	
William Bradford	B 1772, AM 1775	U.S. attorney general, 1794–95	
John C. Breckinridge	Att	Confederate States secretary of war, 1865; vice president of the United States, 1857–61; U.S. senator from Kentucky, 1861	
Benjamin H. Brewster	B 1834	U.S. attorney general, 1881–85	
Manuel Camacho Solís	MPA 1972	Secretary of Urban Development and Ecology of Mexico, 1986–88; mayor of Mexico City, 1988–93	
J. Donald Cameron	B 1852	U.S. secretary of war, 1876–77; U.S. senator from Pennsylvania, 1877–97; chairman of the Republican National Committee, 1880	
George W. Campbell	B 1794	U.S. secretary of the treasury, 1814; U.S. senator from Tennessee, 1811–14, 1815–18; minister to Russia, 1818–21	
Frank Carlucci	B 1952	U.S. National Security advisor, 1986–87; secretary of defense, 1987–89	
Jorge Castañeda Gutman	B 1973	Minister of Foreign Affairs of Mexico, 2000–03	
Chen Pi-Chao	PhD 1966	Vice-minister of National Defense of the Republic of China (Taiwan), 2000–02	
George W. Crawford	B 1820	U.S. Secretary of War, 1849–50; governor of Georgia, 1843–47	
Mitch Daniels	B 1971	U.S. Office of Management and Budget director, 2001–03; governor of Indiana, 2005–13	
Kemal Derviş	PhD 1973, F 1973–78	Finance minister of Turkey, 2001–02; administrator of the United Nations Development Programme, 2005–09	
Mahlon Dickerson	B 1789	U.S. secretary of the Navy, 1834–38; governor of New Jersey, 1815–17; U.S. senator from New Jersey, 1817–33	
John Foster Dulles	B 1908	U.S. secretary of state, 1953–59; U.S. senator from New York, 1949	
Wim van Eekelen	B 1952	Minister of Defence of the Netherlands, 1986–88	
Horst Ehmke	Att	Minister of Justice of West Germany, 1969	
Jim Flaherty	B 1970	Minister of Finance of Canada, 2006–2014	
James Forrestal	Att	U.S. secretary of the Navy, 1944–47; first secretary of defense, 1947–49	
John Forsyth	B 1799	U.S. secretary of state, 1834–41; U.S. senator from Georgia, 1818–19, 1829–34; governor of Georgia, 1827–29	
Thomas F. Gibson	B 1977	Associate director of White House Cabinet Affairs, 1983–1985; director of White House Public Affairs, 1985–1987	
Talât Sait Halman	F 1966–71, 1972–80	First Minister of Culture of Turkey, 1971	
Pete Hegseth	BA 2003	United States secretary of defense, 2025–	
Richard Holbrooke	MCF 1970	U.S. ambassador to the United Nations, 1999–2001; special envoy for Afghanistan and Pakistan, 2009–10	
Lisa P. Jackson	MSE 1986	Administrator of the U.S. Environmental Protection Agency, 2009–2013	
Louka Katseli	MPA 1974, PhD 1978	Minister for the Economy, Competitiveness and Shipping of Greece, 2009–10; minister for Labour and Social Security, 2010–11	
Nicholas Katzenbach	B 1945	U.S. attorney general, 1965–66	
Alan Krueger	F 1987– 2019	Chair of the U.S. Council of Economic Advisers, 2011–2013	
Pedro Pablo Kuczynski	MPA 1971	Minister of Energy and Mines, 1980–82; minister of Economy and Finance, 2001–02, 2004–05; prime minister of Peru, 2005–06; deputy director-general of the Central Reserve Bank of Peru, 1967–69	
Larry Kudlow	Att	12th director of the National Economic Council, 2018–2021	
Anthony Lake	PhD 1974	U.S. National Security advisor, 1993–97	
Charles Lee	B 1775	U.S. attorney general, 1795–1801	
Edward Livingston	B 1781	U.S. secretary of state, 1831–33.; mayor of New York City, 1801–03; U.S. senator from Louisiana, 1829–31; ambassador to France, 1833–35	
James Madison	B 1771, Princeton's first GS	U.S. secretary of state, 1801–09; president of the United States, 1809–17; "father of the U.S. Constitution"	
N. Gregory Mankiw	B 1980	Chair of the U.S. president's Council of Economic Advisers, 2003–05	
John Nelson	AM 1825	U.S. attorney general, 1843–45	
Peter Orszag	B 1991	U.S. Office of Management and Budget director, 2009–10; Congressional Budget Office director, 2007–08	
Frank Pace	B 1933	U.S. Bureau of the Budget director, 1949–50; secretary of the Army, 1950–53	
Juan Carlos Pinzón	MPP 2010	Minister of National Defence of Colombia, 2011–2015	
James M. Porter	Att	U.S. secretary of war, 1843–44	
George M. Robeson	B 1847	U.S. secretary of the Navy, 1869–77	
Christina Romer	F 1985–88	Chair of the U.S. president's Council of Economic Advisers, 2009–10	
Harvey Rosen	F 1974–	Chair of the U.S. president's Council of Economic Advisers, 2005	
William Ruckelshaus	B 1957	Administrator of the U.S. Environmental Protection Agency, 1970–73, 1983–85	
Donald Rumsfeld	B 1954	White House chief of staff, 1974–75; secretary of defense, 1975–77, 2001–06; U.S. ambassador to NATO, 1973–74	
Richard Rush	B 1797	U.S. attorney general, 1814–17; secretary of the treasury, 1825–29; ambassador to the United Kingdom, 1817–25; ambassador to France, 1847–49	
Saud bin Faisal Al Saud	B 1964	Minister of Foreign Affairs of Saudi Arabia, 1975–2015	
Nathan Shamuyarira	B 1967	Minister of Foreign Affairs of Zimbabwe, 1987–1995	
George Shultz	B 1942	U.S. secretary of labor, 1969–70; Office of Management and Budget director, 1970–72; secretary of the treasury, 1972–74; secretary of state, 1982–89	
James Sinclair	GS	Minister of Fisheries of Canada, 1952–57.	
Robert Smith	B 1781	U.S. secretary of the Navy, 1801–09; secretary of state, 1809–11	
Samuel Southard	B 1804	U.S. secretary of the Navy, 1823–29; interim secretary of the treasury, 1825; interim secretary of war, 1828; U.S. senator from New Jersey, 1821–23, 1833–42; governor of New Jersey, 1832–33	
Bruno Stagno Ugarte	MPP 2001	Minister of Foreign Affairs of Costa Rica, 2006–10; ambassador to the United Nations, 2002–06	
Joseph Stiglitz	F 1979–88	Chair of the U.S. president's Council of Economic Advisers, 1995–97; World Bank chief economist, 1997–2000; Nobel Prize in Economics, 2001	
Makhenkesi Stofile	AM 1983	Minister of Sport and Recreation of South Africa, 2004–10	
Smith Thompson	B 1788	U.S. secretary of the Navy, 1818–23; associate justice of the Supreme Court of the United States, 1823–43	
Russell Train	B 1941	Administrator of the U.S. Environmental Protection Agency, 1973–77	
Alexander Trowbridge	B 1951	U.S. secretary of commerce, 1967–68	
Laura Tyson	F 1974–77	Chair of the U.S. president's Council of Economic Advisers, 1993–95; dean of Haas School of Business, 1998–2001; dean of London Business School, 2002–06	
Abel P. Upshur	Att	U.S. secretary of the Navy, 1841–43; secretary of state, 1843–44	
Murray Weidenbaum	PhD 1958	Chair of the U.S. president's Council of Economic Advisers, 1981–82	
Charles Yost	BA 1928	U.S. ambassador to the United Nations, 1969–1971; U.S. ambassador to Laos and Syria and Morocco	

=== Central bankers ===
This is a list of people associated with Princeton who have held senior positions within central banks. Several Princetonians have held senior positions within the Federal Reserve System, the central bank of the United States; two (Ben Bernanke and Paul Volcker) have served as chairman. Nicholas Biddle served as president of the Second Bank of the United States. Several have served in non-U.S. central banks as well.

Name	Affiliation	Notability	Refs
Fakhruddin Ahmed	PhD 1975	Governor of Bangladesh Bank, 2001–05; chief advisor of the caretaker government (interim prime minister) of Bangladesh, 2007–09	
Ben Bernanke	F 1985–2002	Chairman of the Federal Reserve, 2006–2014; member of the Federal Reserve Board, 2002–05; chair of the U.S. president's Council of Economic Advisors, 2005–06	
Nicholas Biddle	B 1801	President of the Second Bank of the United States, 1822–39	
Alan Blinder	B 1967, F 1971–	Vice chairman of the Federal Reserve Board, 1994–96	
David Dodge	PhD 1972	Governor of the Bank of Canada, 2001–08	
W. Braddock Hickman	F	President of the Federal Reserve Bank of Cleveland, 1963–70	
Paul Jenkins	GS 1982–83	Deputy governor of the Bank of Canada, 2003–10	
Narayana Kocherlakota	B 1983	President of the Federal Reserve Bank of Minneapolis, 2009–2015	
Pedro Pablo Kuczynski	MPA 1961	Deputy director-general of the Central Reserve Bank of Peru, 1967–69; minister of Energy and Mines, 1980–82; minister of Economy and Finance, 2001–02, 2004–05; prime minister of Peru, 2005–06; 66th president of Peru, 2016–2018	
Loretta Mester	PhD 1985	President of the Federal Reserve Bank of Cleveland, 2014–	
Rakesh Mohan	AM 1974, PhD 1977	Deputy governor of the Reserve Bank of India, 2002–04, 2005–06	
Jerome Powell	B 1975	Chairman of the Federal Reserve, 2018–; member of the Federal Reserve Board, 2012–; under secretary of the treasury for Domestic Finance, 1992–1993	
Frederick H. Schultz	B 1952	Vice chairman of the Federal Reserve Board, 1979–82	
Jeremy Stein	B 1983	Member of the Federal Reserve Board, 2012–2014	
Lars E. O. Svensson	F 2001–09	Deputy governor of the Riksbank (Bank of Sweden), 2007–	
Paul Volcker	B 1949, F 1974–75	Chairman of the Federal Reserve, 1979–87; vice chairman, 1975–79	
Zhu Min	MPA 1988	Deputy governor of the People's Bank of China, 2009–10; International Monetary Fund: special advisor to the managing director, 2010–11; deputy managing director, 2011–	

=== State and provincial governors ===
The governor of New Jersey is an ex officio trustee of the University. Only governors with another connection to Princeton are included in this list. Princetonians have served as governors of 23 of the 50 U.S. states.

In the "Notes" column, governors of U.S. states who also served in Congress represented the same states they governed unless otherwise specified.

Name	Affiliation	State/province	Service	Notes	Refs
Nathaniel Alexander	B 1776	North Carolina	1805–07	U.S. representative, 1803–05	
Joseph Alston	Att 1795–96	South Carolina	1812–14		
Samuel Ashe	Att	North Carolina	1795–98		
Dewey F. Bartlett	B 1942	Oklahoma	1967–71	U.S. senator, 1973–79	
Joseph Bloomfield	T 1793–1801, 1819–23	New Jersey	1801–12	U.S. representative, 1817–21	
Willie Blount	Att	Tennessee	1809–15		
Kit Bond	B 1960	Missouri	1973–77, 1981–85	U.S. senator, 1987–2011	
Gerard Brandon	Att	Mississippi	1825–26, 1826–32		
Brendan Byrne	B 1949	New Jersey	1974–82		
William Cahill	F 1974–78	New Jersey	1970–74	U.S. representative, 1959–70	
Alfred Colquitt	B 1844	Georgia	1876–80	U.S. representative, 1853–55; Confederate major general in the Civil War; U.S. senator, 1883–94	
Prentice Cooper	B 1917	Tennessee	1939–45		
George W. Crawford	B 1820	Georgia	1843–47	U.S. secretary of war, 1849–50	
Mitch Daniels	B 1971	Indiana	2005–13	Office of Management and Budget director, 2001–03	
William Richardson Davie	B 1776	North Carolina	1798–99		
Mahlon Dickerson	B 1789	New Jersey	1815–17	U.S. senator, 1817–33; secretary of the Navy, 1834–38	
John Drayton	Att	South Carolina	1800–02, 1808–10		
James H. Duff	B 1904	Pennsylvania	1947–51	U.S. senator, 1951–57	
Pierre S. du Pont IV	B 1956	Delaware	1977–85	U.S. representative, 1971–77	
Peter Early	B 1792	Georgia	1813–15	U.S. representative, 1803–07	
Henry W. Edwards	B 1797	Connecticut	1833–34, 1835–38	U.S. representative, 1819–23; U.S. senator, 1823–27	
Bob Ehrlich	B 1979	Maryland	2003–07	U.S. representative, 1995–2003	
John Forsyth	B 1799	Georgia	1827–29	U.S. representative, 1813–18; U.S. senator, 1818–19, 1829–34; secretary of state, 1834–41	
Daniel Fowle	B 1851	North Carolina	1889–91		
William B. Giles	B 1781	Virginia	1827–30	U.S. representative, 1790–98, 1801–03; U.S. senator, 1804–15	
Robert Stockton Green	B 1850	New Jersey	1887–89	U.S. representative, 1885–87	
Daniel Haines	B 1820	New Jersey	1844–45, 1848–51		
Thomas Henderson	B 1761	New Jersey	1793 or 1794		
John Henry	B 1769	Maryland	1797–98	U.S. senator, 1789–97	
James Iredell	B 1806	North Carolina	1828	U.S. senator, 1828–31	
Thomas Kean	B 1957	New Jersey	1982–90	Chair of the 9/11 Commission	
Blair Lee III	B 1938	Maryland	1977–79	Acting governor during Marvin Mandel's term	
Henry "Lighthorse Harry" Lee III	B 1773, AM 1776	Virginia	1792–95	American Revolutionary War cavalry officer	
Morgan Lewis	B 1773	New York	1804–07		
John L. Manning	Att	South Carolina	1852–54		
Alexander Martin	B 1756	North Carolina	1781–84, 1789–92	Acting governor, 1781–82; U.S. senator, 1793–99	
James G. Martin	PhD 1960	North Carolina	1985–93		
James McDowell	B 1817	Virginia	1843–46	U.S. representative, 1846–51	
Patrick Noble	B 1806	South Carolina	1838–40		
Aaron Ogden	B 1773, T 1803–39	New Jersey	1812	U.S. senator, 1802–03	
Joel Parker	B 1839	New Jersey	1863–66, 1872–75		
William Paterson	B 1763	New Jersey	1791–93	U.S. senator, 1789–90; associate justice of the Supreme Court of the United States, 1793–1806	
William Pennington	B 1813	New Jersey	1837–43	U.S. representative, 1859–61; speaker, 1859–61	
Andrew Pickens	Att	South Carolina	1816–18		
Jared Polis	B 1996	Colorado	2019–	U.S. representative, 2009–2019	
James Pollock	B 1831	Pennsylvania	1855–58	U.S. representative, 1844–49	
Thomas Pratt	Att	Maryland	1845–48	U.S. senator, 1850–55, 1855–57	
Rodman Price	Att	New Jersey	1854–57	U.S. representative, 1851–53	
Thomas Riggs Jr.	B 1894	Alaska	1918–21		
John Rutherfoord	B 1810	Virginia	1841–42		
Whitemarsh Seabrook	B 1812	South Carolina	1848–50		
Samuel Southard	B 1804	New Jersey	1832–33	U.S. senator, 1821–23, 1833–42; secretary of the Navy, 1823–29	
Eliot Spitzer	B 1981	New York	2007–08		
Samuel Sprigg	B 1806	Maryland	1819–22		
Ingram Stainback	B 1907	Hawaii	1942–51		
Adlai Stevenson II	B 1922	Illinois	1949–52	Democratic candidate for president of the United States, 1952, 1956, 1960; U.S. ambassador to the United Nations, 1961–65	
David Stone	B 1788	North Carolina	1808–10	U.S. representative, 1799–1801; U.S. senator, 1801–07, 1813–14	
Bob Taft	MPA 1967	Ohio	1999–2007		
John Taylor	B 1790	South Carolina	1826–28	U.S. representative, 1807–10; U.S. senator, 1810–16	
Isaac Tichenor	B 1775	Vermont	1797–1807, 1808–09	U.S. senator, 1796–97, 1815–21	
George Troup	B 1797	Georgia	1823–27	U.S. representative, 1807–15; U.S. senator, 1816–18, 1829–33	
William Henry Vanderbilt III	Att	Rhode Island	1939–41		
George White	B 1895	Ohio	1931–35	U.S. representative, 1911–15, 1917–19; chair of the Democratic National Committee, 1920–21	
G. Mennen Williams	B 1933	Michigan	1949–61	U.S. ambassador to the Philippines, 1968–69	
Woodrow Wilson	B 1879, Pres 1902–10	New Jersey	1911–13	President of the United States, 1913–21	
John Gilbert Winant	Att, AM 1925	New Hampshire	1925–27, 1931–35	First chairman of the Social Security Board, 1935–37; U.S. ambassador to the United Kingdom, 1941–46	

=== Other ===
This section lists people not listed in prior sections. It includes members of legislatures other than the U.S. Congress, judges and other legal officials, diplomats, sub-Cabinet officials, activists, royalty, and other figures in politics and government.

Name	Affiliation	Notability	Refs
Munib Akhtar	B 1986	Justice of the Supreme Court of Pakistan, 2018–	
Ralph A. Bard	B 1906	U.S. assistant secretary of the Navy, 1941–44; under secretary of the Navy, 1944–45	
Della Au Belatti	B 1996	Majority leader of the Hawaii House of Representatives, 2017–; member of the Hawaii House of Representatives, 2007–	
Walden Bello	PhD 1975	Member of the House of Representatives of the Philippines, 2007–	
James G. Birney	B 1810	Publisher of The Philanthropist; Liberty Party candidate for president of the United States, 1840, 1844	
Bill Botzow	B 1968	Member of Vermont House of Representatives, 2002–	
Matthew Boxer	B 1992	First New Jersey state comptroller, 2008–2013	
Cabell Breckinridge	B 1810	Speaker of the Kentucky House of Representatives (1817–1819); Kentucky secretary of state (1820–1823); member of the Breckinridge family; married Mary Clay Smith, daughter of Princeton President Samuel Stanhope Smith	
Rudi Brewster	B 1954	United States district judge, 1984–2012	
William Marshall Bullitt	B 1894	Solicitor general of the U.S., 1912–13	
Jacob Candelaria	B 2009	Member of the New Mexico State Senate, 2013–	
Harvey Locke Carey	GS 1943	United States attorney for the Western District of Louisiana, 1950–1952	
Josephine Chu	B 1990	Member of the Legislative Yuan of the Republic of China, 1996–2002	
William Colby	B 1940	U.S. director of Central Intelligence, 1973–76	
Herb Conaway	B 1985	Member of the New Jersey General Assembly, 1998–; U.S. congressman, 2025–	
Shasti Conrad	MPA 2015	Vice chair of the Democratic National Committee (2025–present) and chair of the Washington State Democratic Party (2023–present)	
Robert Cooper	B 1979	26th attorney general of Tennessee, 2006–2014	
Ryan Crocker	MCF 1985	U.S. ambassador to Lebanon, 1990; Kuwait, 1994–97; Syria, 1998–2001; Pakistan, 2004–07; Iraq, 2007–09; Afghanistan, 2011–	
Ted Cruz	B 1992	Solicitor general of Texas, 2003–08; U.S. senator since 2013	
Shelby Cullom Davis	B 1930	U.S. ambassador to Switzerland, 1969–1975	
William Lewis Dayton Jr.	B 1858	U.S. ambassador to the Netherlands	
David A. Depue	B 1846	Associate justice and chief justice of the Supreme Court of New Jersey	
John Doar	B 1944	Lead prosecutor in the "Mississippi Burning" trial	
Allen Dulles	B 1914, AM 1916	U.S. director of Central Intelligence, 1953–61	
John Edwards	B 1966	Member of the Virginia State Senate, 1996–; U.S. attorney for the Western District of Virginia, 1980–1981	
Manny Espitia	B 2011	Member of the New Hampshire State Senate, 2018–	
Andy Fleischmann	B 1986	Member of the Connecticut House of Representatives, 1995–	
Vince Fong	MPA 2003	Member of the California State Assembly, 2016–	
Steve Forbes	B 1970	Publishing executive, Republican candidate for president of the United States in 1996 and 2000	
L. Scott Frantz	B 1982	Member of the Connecticut State Senate, 2009–2018	
Charles Fried	B 1956	Solicitor general of the United States, 1985–89	
Richard Funkhouser	B 1939	U.S. ambassador to Gabon, 1969–70	
Prince Ghazi bin Muhammad	B 1988	Prince of Jordan	
Robert Goheen	B 1940, AM 1947, PhD 1948, F 1948–72, Pres 1957–72	U.S. ambassador to India, 1977–80	
Caitlin Halligan	B 1988	Solicitor general of New York, 2001–07	
Brian Hoven	B 1963	Member of the Montana State Senate, 2015–; member of the Montana House of Representatives, 2009–2015	
Ted Hsu	PhD 1989	Member of the House of Commons of Canada for Kingston and the Islands, 2011–	
Christopher Hughes	B 1805	Chargé d'affaires in Sweden and The Netherlands in the 1820s and 1830s	
Eric Johnson	MPA 2003	Member of the Texas House of Representatives, 2010–	
Brian Kavanagh	B 1989	Member of the New York State Senate, 2017–; member of the New York State Assembly, 2007–2017	
George F. Kennan	B 1925	Cold War diplomat and architect of the United States's "containment" strategy	
A.B. Krongard	B 1958	Executive director of the CIA, 2001–04	
W. Thacher Longstreth	B 1941	Philadelphia City Councilman, 1969–71, 1983–2003	
Donold Lourie	B 1922	U.S. under secretary of state for administration, 1953–54	
Sara Love	B 1989	Member of the Maryland Senate, 2024–; member of the Maryland House of Delegates, 2018–2024	
Chris Lu	B 1988	Cabinet secretary to U.S. President Barack Obama, 2009–13; U.S. deputy secretary of labor 2014–2017	
Donald Lu	B 1988, MPA 1991	U.S. ambassador to Albania, 2015–	
John Mackintosh	Att	Member of the UK House of Commons, 1966–74, 1974–78	
Lorna Marsden	PhD 1972	Member of the Senate of Canada representing Ontario, 1984–92	
Rachel May	B 1978	Member of the New York State Senate, 2019–	
Robert Mueller	B 1966	Special counsel for the United States Department of Justice, 2017–; director of the F.B.I., 2001–2013	
Raj Mukherji	MPP 2023	Member of the New Jersey Senate, 2024–; majority whip of the New Jersey General Assembly, 2018-2020; member of the New Jersey General Assembly, 2014–2024	
Ralph Nader	B 1955	U.S. presidential candidate, consumer advocate, political activist	
Queen Noor of Jordan	B 1974	Queen consort of Jordan, 1978–99; queen dowager of Jordan, 1999–	
Michelle Obama	B 1985	First Lady of the United States, 2009–2017	
Paul Offner	MPA 1966, PhD 1970	Wisconsin state senator, 1977–84; District of Columbia commissioner of Health Care Finance, 1995–99	
Richard Perle	AM 1967	Chairman of the Defense Policy Board Advisory Committee, 2001–03	
David Petraeus	MPA 1985, PhD 1987	Head of U.S. forces in Iraq, 2007–08; commander of USCENTCOM, 2008–10; commander of U.S. and international forces in Afghanistan, 2010–11; director of the Central Intelligence Agency, 2011–	
Herman Quirmbach	PhD 1983	Member of the Iowa State Senate, 2003–	
Stuart Rabner	B 1982	New Jersey attorney general, 2006–07; chief Justice of the New Jersey Supreme Court, 2007–	
Doug Racine	B 1974	78th lieutenant governor of Vermont, 1997–2003; member of the Vermont State Senate, 1983–1993	
Bruce Reed	B 1982	Chief of staff to the vice president of the United States, 2011–2013	
Albert Rees	former Provost	Advisor to President Gerald Ford	
Richard Riordan	B 1952	Mayor of Los Angeles, 1993–2001	
James N. Robertson	B 1935	Member of the Pennsylvania House of Representatives, 1949–1952	
Anthony Romero	B 1987	Executive director of the American Civil Liberties Union, 2001–	
Patrick Rose	B 2001	Member of the Texas House of Representatives, 2003–2011	
Stapleton Roy	B 1956	U.S. ambassador to Singapore, 1984–86; China, 1991–95; Indonesia, 1996–99	
Andrew Schlafly	B 1981	Conservative lawyer and activist; founder of Conservapedia	
Deb Schulte	B 1982	Member of House of Commons of Canada for King-Vaughan, 2015–	
Dan Schwartz	B 1972	21st treasurer of Nevada, 2015–	
Sean Shaw	B 2000	Member of the Florida House of Representatives, 2016–	
Andrew Sidamon-Eristoff	B 1985	Treasurer of New Jersey, 2010–2015	
Anne-Marie Slaughter	B 1980; F 2002–09, 2011–	Dean of Princeton's Woodrow Wilson School of Public and International Affairs, 2002–09; director of Policy Planning for the U.S. State Department, 2009–11	
Henry DeWolf Smyth	B 1918, AM 1920, PhD 1921, F 1924–66	Author of the Smyth Report; Member of the U.S. Atomic Energy Commission, 1949–54; U.S. ambassador to the International Atomic Energy Agency, 1961–70	
Ronald Spiers	MPA 1950	U.S. Ambassador to Turkey, 1977–80; U.S. ambassador to Pakistan, 1982–83; under secretary of state for management, 1983–89	
Heather Steans	B 1985	Member of the Illinois Senate, 2008–	
Dana Stein	MPA 1985	Member of the Maryland House of Delegates, 2002–2003, 2007–	
Andrew Steinberg	B 1980	U.S. assistant secretary of transportation for Aviation and International Affairs, 2006–08; chief counsel of the Federal Aviation Administration, 2003–06	
Phillip Swagel	B 1987	U.S. assistant secretary of the treasury for economic policy, 2006–09	
Jimmy Tarlau	B 1970	Member of the Maryland House of Delegates, 2015–	
Norman Thomas	B 1905	Socialist, pacifist, and six-time presidential candidate	
Mary Throne	B 1982	Minority leader of the Wyoming House of Representatives, 2013–2017; member of the Wyoming House of Representatives, 2007–2017	
Micah Townshend	B 1766, MA 1769	Secretary of state of Vermont	
Trevor Traina	B 1990	U.S. ambassador to Austria, 2018–	
Sharon Treat	B 1978	Majority leader of the Maine State Senate, 2002–2004; member of the Maine State Senate, 1996–2004; member of the Maine House of Representatives, 1990–1996, 2006–2014	
David Trefgarne	Att	Member of the British House of Lords, 1962–; held a number of posts in the Thatcher ministry	
Charles Trump IV	B 1982	Member of the West Virginia State Senate, 2014–; member of the West Virginia House of Delegates, 1992–2006	
Zach Wahls	MPA 2018	Member of the Iowa Senate, 2019–	
Suzi Wizowaty	B 1977	Member of the Vermont House of Representatives, 2009–2015	
