= Maximum retail price =

Price ceiling policy used in India and Bangladesh

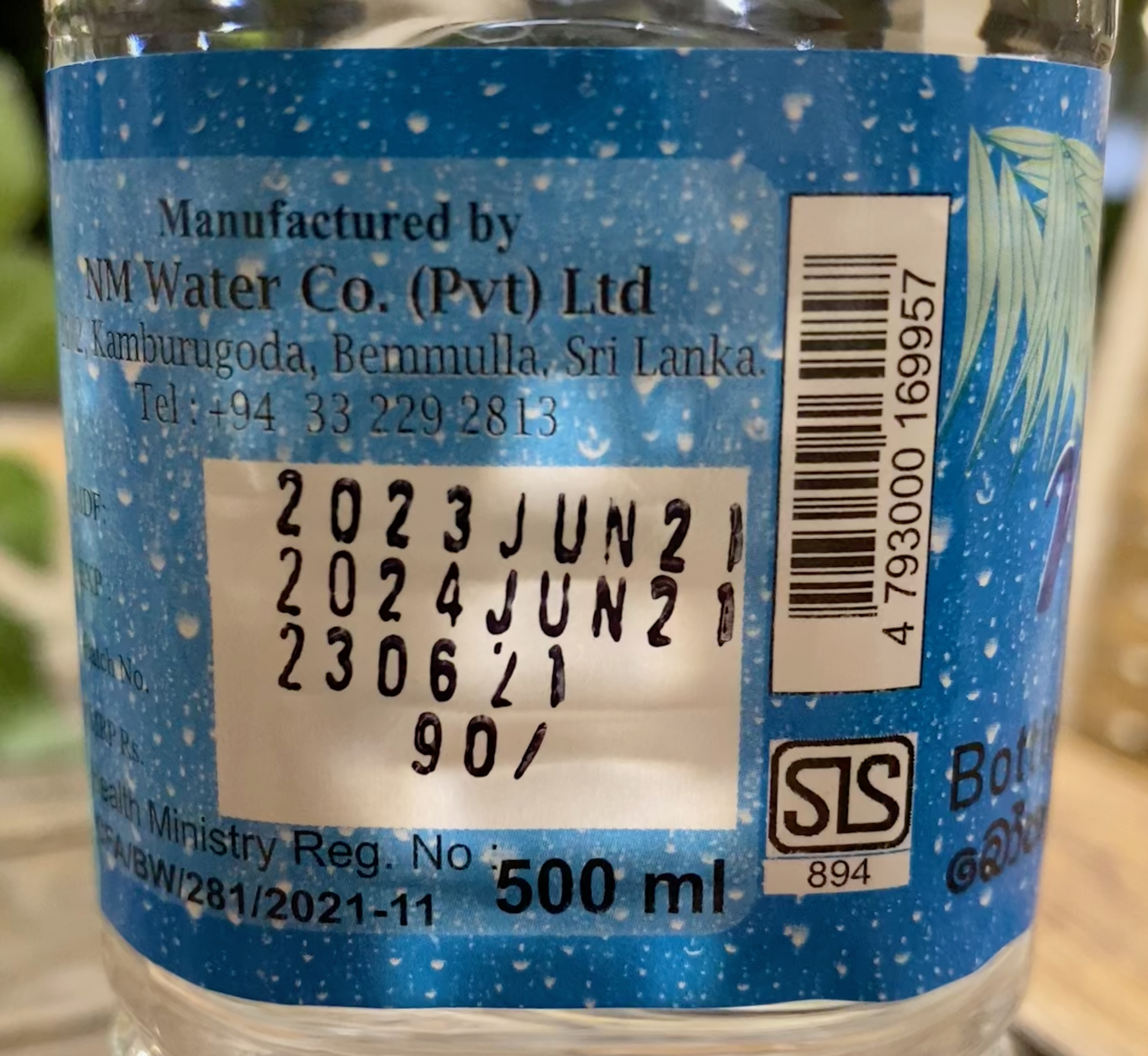
The MRP of this bottle of water in Sri Lanka is 90 Rupees.

Maximum retail price (MRP) is a manufacturer-calculated price that is the highest price that can be charged for a product sold in India, Indonesia, where it is known as Harga Eceran Tertinggi (HET), and Bangladesh. The MRP is also imposed by the government in Sri Lanka for goods designated as 'essential commodities'.

== About ==
The benefits of having a nationwide, legally-enforced MRP include lower prices for consumers and a decrease in the symptoms of inflation. All retail products in India must be marked with their MRP. Shops cannot charge customers over the MRP. Some shops may charge slightly below MRP to draw more customers to their stores. In some remote areas, tourist spots, and in situations where a product is difficult to obtain, consumers are often charged illegally over the MRP.

However, the retailers may choose to sell products for less than the MRP. MRP differs from systems using a recommended retail price because in those systems the price calculated by the manufacturer is only a recommendation, not enforceable by law.

In April 2015, it was reported that milk vendors in Mumbai were threatening a boycott because the Maharashtra state government announced it would intervene due to the vendors charging above MRP for milk.

== Criticism ==
The concept of MRP has been criticized as incompatible with the free market system, because it involves manufacturers deciding what profit retailers will make. It is easy for sellers to charge more than the MRP by charging for 'services' on top of the item price, such as a 'cooling charge' for cold drinks, or by manufacturers setting the MRP at up to ten times the expected sale price. In Sri Lanka, it has been reported that the MRP for basic items at food stalls is circumvented by the operators charging separately for ingredients in the food, such as the eggs in egg hoppers. The MRP also hurts consumers in rural areas because if retailers cannot charge a higher price to make up for the higher cost of transportation and distribution to those areas, they may simply not stock those items.

== Unit sale price ==
From 2022 onwards the USP (Price per unit, KG or per gram) is displayed along with MRP for goods in India.

== Gallery ==
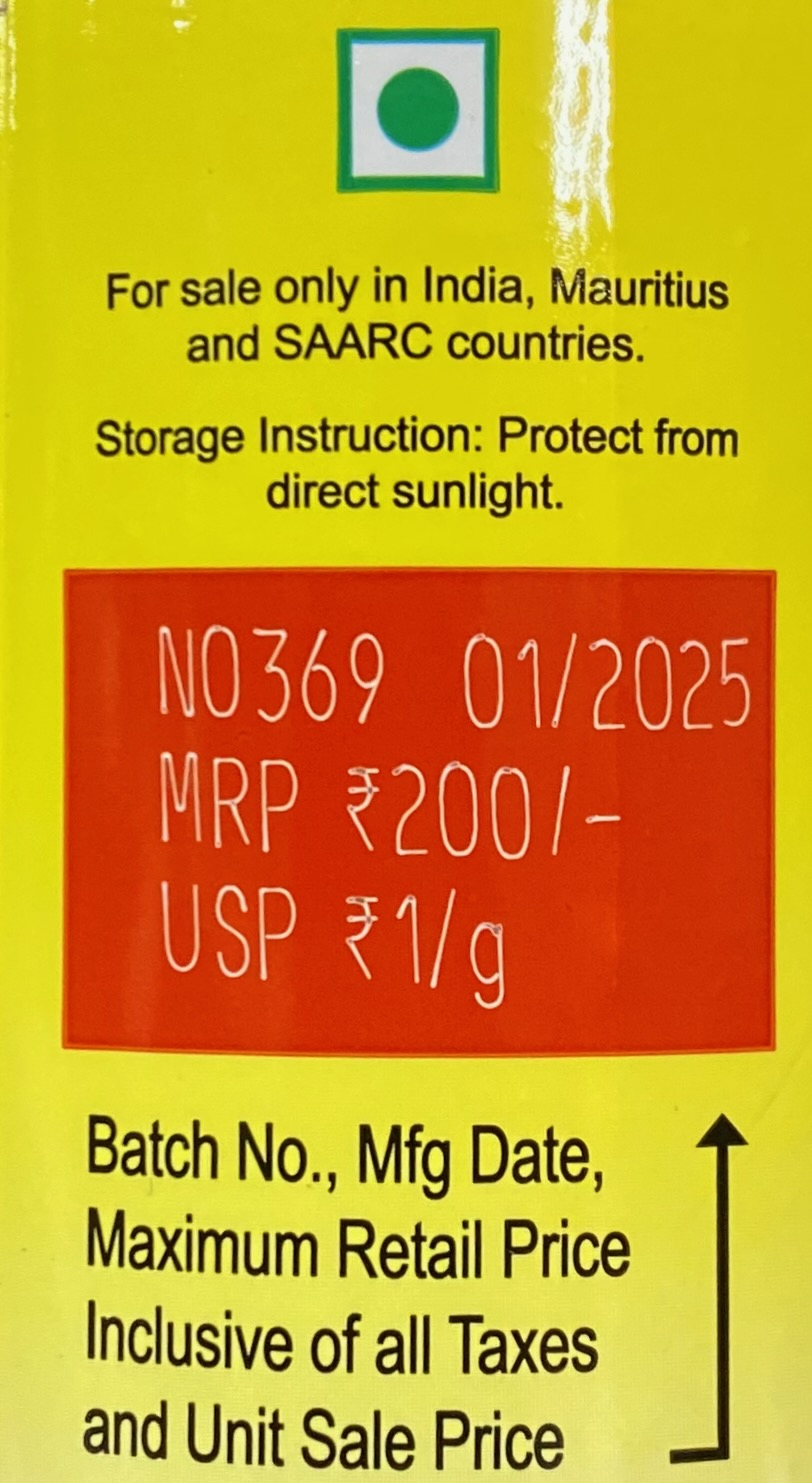
MRP and USP markings on a Vicco product

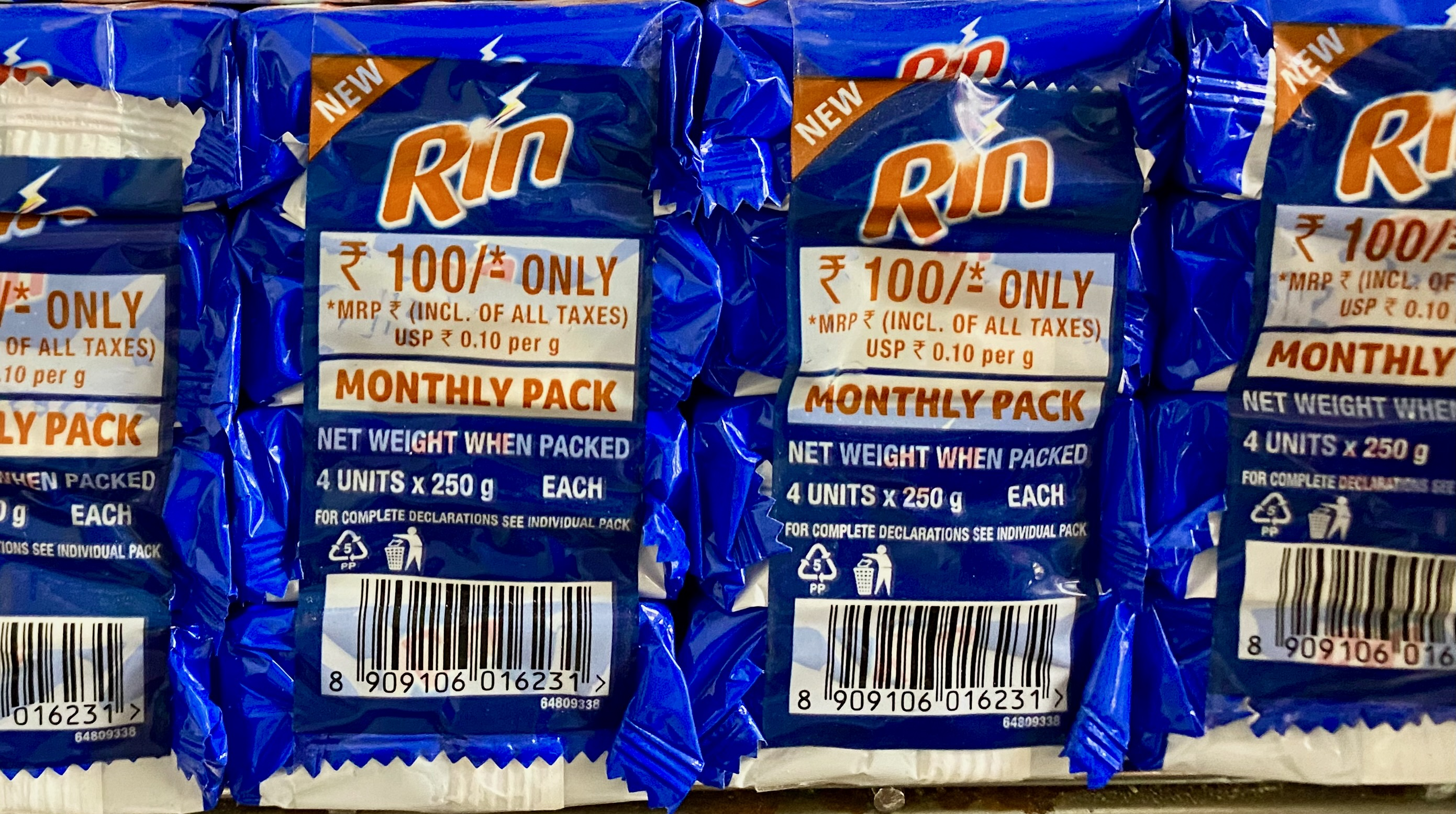
MRP markings on Indian laundry soap packets

== See also ==
- Price controls
- Recommended retail price
- Resale price maintenance
