= Chen Pi-chao =

Taiwanese politician

Chen Pi-Chao (Chinese: 陳必照; pinyin: Chén Bìzhào; c. 1937 – 25 March 2005) was a Taiwanese politician with the Democratic Progressive Party.

== Personal life and academic career ==
Chen was a member of the first entering class of Tunghai University, graduating in 1959. He left Taiwan in 1961 to attend Wayne State University before going on to Princeton University, where he received a Ph.D. in politics in 1966 after completing a doctoral dissertation titled "The politics of population in Communist China: a case study of birth control policy, 1949-1965". Thereafter he did fieldwork on the topic in mainland China and published several other works on the topic. He naturalised as a U.S. citizen in 1973. He had two sons, David and Levi.

== In politics ==
As democracy reform took hold in Taiwan in the 1990s, Chen returned to Taiwan in order to take part in politics. He renounced his U.S. citizenship in 1995.

Thereafter, he served as a consultant to the Ministry of National Defense and a member of the National Security Council during the presidency of Lee Teng-hui, and then became Vice-Minister of Defense during the presidency of Chen Shui-bian. Despite the fact that he was no longer a U.S. citizen by then, the fact that he had previously held U.S. citizenship made him a controversial choice for the position. He retired from public life in 2002 due to poor health.

== Works ==
- Chen, Pi-chao (1966). The politics of population in communist China: a case study of birth control policy, 1949–1965. Ph.D. dissertation. Princeton University. OCLC 12113188.
- Chen, Pi-chao (1973). China's population program at the grassroots level: report on a field trip, summer, 1972. Occasional Papers of the Caltech Population Program. OCLC 4958202.
- Chen, Pi-chao; Miller, Ann (1974). The "planned birth" program of the People's Republic of China, with a brief analysis of its transferability. SEADAG papers on problems of development in Southeast Asia. New York: Southeast Asia Development Advisory Group of the Asia Society. OCLC 1422791.
- Chen, Pi-chao (1981). Rural health and birth planning in China. North Carolina: International Fertility Research Program. OCLC 30654877.
