= Amalgamated Meat Cutters v. Connally =

- Court: United States District Court for the District of Columbia
- Full case name: Amalgamated Meat Cutters and Butcher Workmen of North America, AFL-CIO v. John B. Connally, Individually, and as Chairman of the Cost of Living Council, et al.
- Decided: October 22, 1971
- Docket nos.: 1833-71
- Citation: 337 F. Supp. 737

Court membership
- Judges sitting: Harold Leventhal, Aubrey Eugene Robinson Jr., Charles Robert Richey

Amalgamated Meat Cutters v. Connally, 337 F. Supp. 737 (D.D.C. 1971), is a court case decided by the United States District Court for the District of Columbia relating to the limits of the nondelegation doctrine. The district court upheld the delegation of legislative power to the executive branch that was contained in the Economic Stabilization Act. Even though the Act gave a broad grant of legislative power (what opponents called a "blank check"), the court reasoned that discretion of the executive branch would be limited by:

1. The "broad equity standard inherent in a stabilization program" (i.e. the norms of rule of law and the history and tradition of executive regulation of the economy)
2. The practice of "self-narrowing." Specifically, the court believed that once the executive branch developed standards for exercising its discretion, it would be bound by those standards it had previously set.

Federal Courts accepted the principle of self-narrowing for about thirty years. In Whitman v. American Trucking Associations, Inc. (2001), however, the United States Supreme Court, in a decision written by Justice Scalia, specifically overturned the principle of self-narrowing, arguing that "[t]he very choice of which portion of power to exercise ... would itself be an exercise of the forbidden legislative authority." [emphasis original] In both decisions, however, the courts ultimately upheld the grant of discretionary power, thus indicating the continued weakness of the nondelegation doctrine.
