= Prices and Incomes Act 1966 =

Act of the Parliament of the United Kingdom

- Act of Parliament
- Parliament of the United Kingdom
- Long title: An Act to establish a National Board for Prices and Incomes, and authorise the bringing into force of provisions requiring notice of price increases, pay increases and other matters, and for enforcing a temporary standstill in prices or charges or terms and conditions of employment; in connection with recommendations made by the said Board, to amend the Restrictive Trade Practices Act 1956; to provide, for a period lasting not more than twelve months, for restricting price increases and pay increases and for other matters connected with prices and incomes; and for connected purposes.
- Citation: 1966 c. 33
- Territorial extent: United Kingdom

Dates
- Royal assent: 12 August 1966
- Commencement: 12 August 1966 (Note: The Acts of Parliament (Commencement) Act 1793.)
- Repealed: 22 March 1973
Other legislation
Amended by	Prices and Incomes Act 1967; Prices and Incomes Act 1968
Repealed by	Counter-Inflation Act 1973

Status: Repealed

The Prices and Incomes Act 1966 (c. 33) was an act of the Parliament of the United Kingdom that formed a central part of the Labour government's attempt to control inflation through direction intervention in wage and price setting.

Introduced under Prime Minister Harold Wilson, the act responded to rising wage settlements and price increases during the mid-1960s, with earning increasing approximately 8 per cent per annum at the time.

The act gave statutory powers to the National Board for Prices and Incomes (NBPI) to investigate proposed wage increases and price rises. Employers and trade unions could be required to give advance notice of intended changes, which ministers could then refer to the Board for examination. Following a report, the government was empowered to impose legally binding controls, including temporary ''standstills'' delaying implementation.

In July 1966, the government used the act to impose a six-month general standstill on most wages, salaries, rent and prices, representing one of the most extensive peacetime economic interventions in British history. While limited exemptions were made, particularly for the lowest-paid workers, the policy was widely criticised by trade unions, who argued that it undermined free collective bargaining and disproportionately affected workers' living standards.

The act proved politically controversial and placed strain on relations between the Labour government and the trade union movement. Although it temporarily restrained wage and price inflation enforcement difficiulties and uneven complicated limited its long-term effectiveness. The legislation was amended by the Prices and Incomes Act 1967, and statutory wage and price controls were gradually abandoned by the end of the decade.

The Prices and Income Act 1966 was later repealed, and is general regarded as an important but ultimately unsuccessful experiment in state-led wage and price control during a period of economic instability in post-war Britain

== Subsequent developments ==
The whole act, so far as unrepealed, was repealed by section 23(3) of, and schedule 6 to, the Counter-Inflation Act 1973, which came into force on 22 March 1973.

== See also ==
- United Kingdom labour law
- National Board for Prices and Incomes
