= Committee for a Responsible Federal Budget =

American non-profit organization

The Committee for a Responsible Federal Budget
- Abbreviation: CRFB
- Formation: June 10, 1981; 45 years ago
- Type: Public policy think tank
- Tax ID no.: 52-1231278
- Purpose: Federal deficit reduction
- Headquarters: 1025 Connecticut Ave NW, Suite 1100, Washington, DC 20036
- Location: Washington, D.C.
- President: Maya MacGuineas
- Revenue: $4,137,343 (2023)
- Expenses: $4,941,731 (2023)
- Website: crfb.org

The Committee for a Responsible Federal Budget (CRFB) is a nonprofit 501(c)(3) charitable organization and think tank headquartered in Washington, D.C., which advocates for public policy to reduce the federal budget deficit and lower government spending. The CRFB describes itself as "nonpartisan", as do many media outlets. The New York Times, more descriptively, said that the CFRB is a "centrist business-supported group dedicated to lower deficits".

It was founded in 1981 by former United States Representative Robert Giaimo (D-CT) and United States Senator Henry Bellmon (R-OK), and its board of directors includes past heads of the House and Senate Budget Committees, the Congressional Budget Office, the Office of Management and Budget, and the Government Accountability Office.

== History ==
=== Founding and Cost Containment Coalition ===
The organization was founded by former representative and chair of the House Budget Committee Robert Giaimo (D-CT) and former senator and ranking member of the Senate Budget Committee member Henry Bellmon (R-OK) on June 10, 1981. After leaving Congress, the two created the CFRB with members including other former Budget Committee chairmen, former directors of the Office of Management and Budget, economists, and businessmen.

In the 1990s the CRFB formed the Cost Containment Coalition, led by then-president Carol Cox Wait. Paul Blumenthal and Ryan Grim in HuffPost criticized the CRFB for receiving funding from Philip Morris, a multi-national tobacco company, and the Tobacco Institute during this period. Cox Wait was also criticized for her personal connections to Philip Morris, as she was a "corporate affairs consultant" for the company and was married to Philip Morris vice president Bob Wait. An "inter-office correspondence" memo says that the Coalition was thought up by employees at Philip Morris but was going to be formed "under the auspices of the Committee for a Responsible Federal Budget," and that its purpose was to take "the focus away from excise taxes." The Coalition lobbied against an excise tax on tobacco under consideration by the Clinton administration.

=== 2000s and 2010s ===
From 2004 through 2013, the CRFB was based at the New America Foundation, a non-profit public policy think tank based in Washington D.C. Maya MacGuineas, president of CRFB, was the program director of New America's Fiscal Policy Program, and most of CRFB's staff were also co-appointed to positions at New America. As of January 2014 the organization no longer has ties with the New America Foundation.

In 2008, the organization received a grant from the Pew Charitable Trusts to raise the public understanding of important fiscal matters facing the country during the 2008 presidential election. This project, called US Budget Watch, was also tasked with tracking the candidates’ tax and spending promises both during and after the election. The project has continued to release reports in subsequent presidential elections.

In late 2008, CRFB received support from The Peter G. Peterson Foundation and the Pew Charitable Trusts to create a new commission that would explore options for reforming the federal budget process, the Peterson-Pew Commission on Budget Reform. The Commission released its initial report, "Red Ink Rising," in December 2009 and its second report, "Getting Back in the Black," in November 2010.

In early 2009, CRFB unveiled Stimulus.org, a database which tracked the spending and deficit impact of all major government actions taken due to the 2008 financial crisis. On the April 5, 2009 edition of CBS’ Face the Nation, host Bob Schieffer used figures from CRFB's "Stimulus Watch" chart while questioning Treasury Secretary Timothy Geithner about the amount of Troubled Asset Relief Program (TARP) funds that remained unspent.

In 2009, CRFB's "Fiscal Roadmap Project" was launched. The Project outlined how the U.S. could move from stabilizing the economy during the 2008 financial crisis to addressing its long-term fiscal problems. The ultimate goal of the Project was to show how policymakers could eventually put the country in what CRFB regarded as a sounder fiscal position. The project released at least two long analyses, one on deficits and another on the activities of the Federal Reserve during the 2008 financial crisis. The Fiscal Roadmap Project was originally directed by Anne Vorce, former U.S. economic expert for the European Commission.

In early 2011, former fiscal commission co-chairs Erskine Bowles and Alan Simpson launched the Moment of Truth Project, with the intent "to foster honest discussion about the nation's fiscal challenges" through "public education, Congressional outreach, and technical and policy analysis."

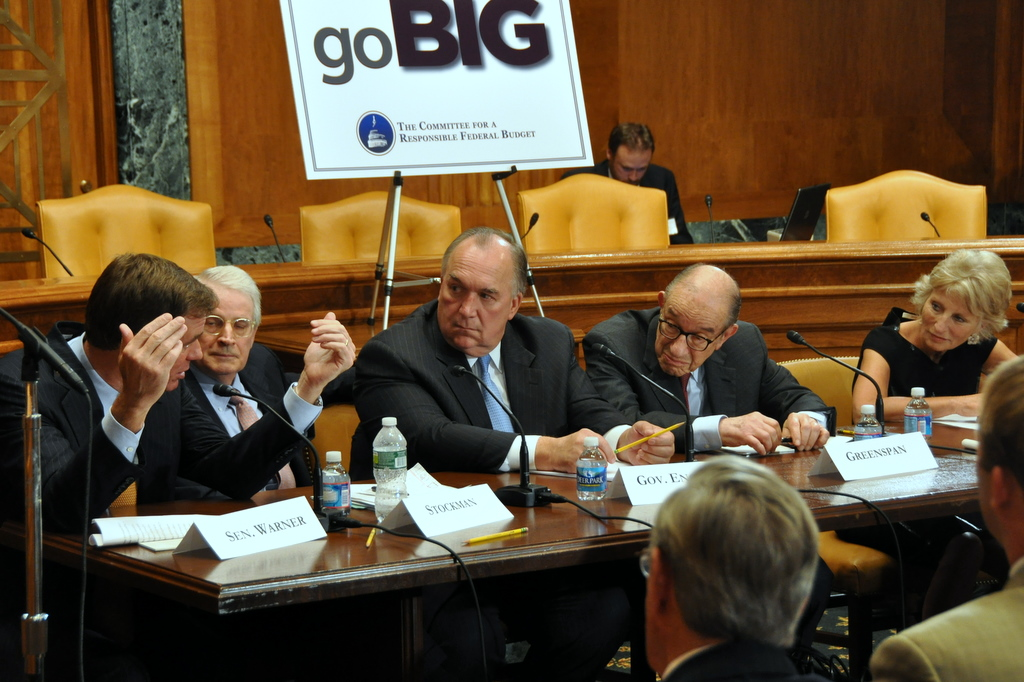
Mark Warner, David Stockman, John Engler, Alan Greenspan and Jane Harman at Go Big 2011

CRFB launched the Go Big Initiative after The Budget Control Act of 2011 tasked a bipartisan 12-member Joint Congressional Committee on Deficit Reduction with finding an additional $1.5 trillion in deficit reduction. For this reason, CRFB launched "Go Big" in an effort to urge the Joint Congressional Committee to exceed its savings mandate of $1.5 trillion and enact a bipartisan, comprehensive fiscal reform plan.

In 2014, The Better Budget Process Initiative was created to fix the "broken" budget process by "increasing focus the on long-term fiscal outlook, improving the process for dealing with the debt limit, strengthening statutory budget enforcement, revising the content and structure of the budget resolution, moving to biennial budgeting, and addressing treatment of tax expenditures in the budget process." Publications produced by the initiative include principles for a budget resolution and budget baseline reforms.

The Campaign to Fix the Debt was launched in July 2012, and has advocated for deficit reduction (including cuts to Social Security and Medicare) and tax reform to avoid a fiscal cliff. In 2012, former Democrat Erskine Bowles and former Republican Senator Alan Simpson served as co-chairs, while former Pennsylvania Governor Ed Rendell and former senator Judd Gregg served as steering committee co-chairs.

The McCrery-Pomeroy SSDI Solutions Initiative was launched in 2014 to identify "practical policy changes to improve the Social Security Disability Insurance (SSDI) program and other policies for people with disabilities." It was co-chaired by former Congressmen Earl Pomeroy (D-ND) and Jim McCrery (R-LA), both former chairmen of the House Ways & Means Social Security Subcommittee. The initiative published a book, SSDI Solutions: Ideas to Strengthen the Social Security Disability Insurance Program, in 2016 based on papers commissioned from various policy experts. It published several more commissioned papers in 2018 and 2019.

=== 2020s ===
In 2020, FixUS was launched as an initiative of the Fix the Debt Campaign. According to its website: "FixUS is a group of Americans united in shared concern over the divided state of our country. We believe that healing these divisions is our highest national priority, and essential to preparing our nation to face the defining challenges of the 21st century." FixUS conducted a national Roadshow and Listening Tour to discuss the national debt as well as partisan divisions, and produced a report on its findings.

U.S. representative Jared Golden (D-ME 2nd) worked with the CRFB and the Tax Foundation on a compromise plan with balanced spending cuts and tax increases as the nation's debt neared its statutory ceiling in mid-2023. Golden's eight-page proposal did not attract any support from other House members publicly.

== Leadership ==
The committee's first president was Carol Cox Wait, who served until 2003 and remains on CRFB's board of directors. Cox Wait was succeeded by Maya MacGuineas, who also served as director of the Fiscal Policy Program at the New America Foundation. In July 2015, CRFB announced Mitch Daniels, Leon Panetta and Timothy Penny as the new co-chairs of its board. CRFB's board of directors was previously co-chaired by William Frenzel (R-MN), Timothy Penny (I-MN), and Charles Stenholm (D-TX), all former Congressional representatives.

The organization's activities are overseen by a 40-member board of directors. A large part of the board is composed of former directors of budget-related government offices including the Congressional Budget Office (CBO), the Office of Management and Budget (OMB), the House and Senate Budget Committees, and the Federal Reserve Board of Governors. The group also includes numerous former Congressmen, former U.S. Comptrollers General, university and think tank experts on fiscal policy, and prominent members of the business and legal community.

== Research and publications ==
The Committee focuses on many issues including deficit reduction, entitlement reform, fundamental tax reform, improving the budget process, and other topical issues as they arise.

In the past, CRFB has produced analyses in areas including:

- A detailed summary and cost estimate of the Coronavirus Aid, Relief, and Economic Security (CARES) Act, and an infographic visualizing how the money will be spent
- The stages in the annual federal budget cycle (e.g., the president's budget submission, Congressional Budget Resolution, explainers on appropriations, government shutdowns, etc.)
- Developments and changes in Congressional budget procedures and process, such as an appropriations tracker
- The status and future prospects of long-term government "entitlement" programs (e.g., Medicare, Medicaid, and Social Security)
- The findings of regular financial and budgetary reports put out by government offices (e.g., the Congressional Budget Office's "Monthly Budget Report," the "Budget and Economic Outlook," and the Long-Term budget Outlook.")
- Tax and spending bills proposed by Congress or the president
- The costs of the candidates’ campaign promises during the 2008, 2012, 2016, and 2020 presidential elections, including an analysis of 2020 candidate health care plans
- The fiscal implications of the government's actions during the 2008 financial crisis
- Major public policy initiatives (e.g., health care reform), including an illustrative stimulus plan, and a list of budget offsets that can produce savings.

The organization also issues regular press releases on day-to-day news developments related to federal budget, tax, and fiscal policy.

== Criticism ==
Michael Hiltzik, writing in the Los Angeles Times in 2024, called the CRFB "a billionaire's front group that likes to portray itself as a neutral budget watchdog" due to the group's ties to billionaire Peter G. Peterson and The Peter G. Peterson Foundation. That same year, Paul Blumenthal and Christina Wilkie, writing in HuffPost, made a similar criticism of the group's connection to Peterson.

Economist Paul Krugman, writing in The New York Times, criticized "deficit scolds" like the CFRB for having bad policy suggestions and being hypocritical, as well as having hidden intentions to "shred the social safety net". Krugman argued in 2012 that "the deficit scolds, while posing as the nation's noble fiscal defenders, have in practice shown themselves both hypocritical and incoherent. They don't deserve to have a central role in policy discussion; they really don't even deserve a seat at the table." In July 2025, however, he said that the CFRB is "an honest, highly competent think tank".

== Prominent past and current board members ==
- Barry Anderson, former acting director of the Congressional Budget Office (CBO)
- Roy Ash, former Office of Management and Budget (OMB) director for Nixon and Ford administrations
- Nancy Kassebaum Baker, former U.S. senator from Kansas
- Henry Bellmon, former governor of Oklahoma and U.S. senator from Oklahoma and co-founder of CRFB
- Erskine Bowles, former co-chairmen of the National Commission on Fiscal Responsibility and Reform
- Charles Bowsher, former Comptroller General of Government Accountability Office (GAO) under the Reagan administration
- Kent Conrad, former chairman of the Senate Budget Committee
- Dan Crippen, former CBO director from 1999 to 2003
- Mitch Daniels, former OMB director and Governor of Indiana
- Dick Darman, former OMB director under George H.W. Bush administration
- Vic Fazio, former U.S. representative from California
- William Frenzel, former U.S. representative from Minnesota
- Bill Gradison Jr., former U.S. representative from Ohio
- William H. Gray III, former U.S. representative from Pennsylvania
- Alan Greenspan, former chairman of the Federal Reserve
- Jane Harman, former U.S. representative from California
- William Hoagland, former staff director of the Senate Budget Committee
- Douglas Holtz-Eakin, former director of CBO, economic advisor to McCain 2008 presidential campaign
- James R. Jones, former Chief of staff to Lyndon Johnson
- Lou Kerr, president and chair of the Kerr Foundation
- Jim Kolbe, former U.S. representative from Arizona
- James Lynn, former director of OMB
- Marjorie Margolies, former U.S. representative from Pennsylvania
- Dave McCurdy, former U.S. representative from Oklahoma
- James T. McIntyre, former director of the OMB
- David Minge, former U.S. representative from Minnesota
- Jim Nussle, former director of OMB under George W. Bush
- Paul O'Neill, former Secretary of the Treasury under George W. Bush
- June E. O'Neill, former director of CBO
- Marne Obernaurer Jr., chairman of the Beverage Distributors Company
- Robert Packwood, former chairman of the Senate Finance Committee
- Leon Panetta, former OMB director and director of the Central Intelligence Agency
- Rudolph Penner, former CBO director
- Timothy Penny, former U.S. representative from Minnesota
- Peter G. Peterson, former U.S. Secretary of Commerce and founder of Peter G. Peterson Foundation
- Robert Reischauer, former director of CBO and president of the Urban Institute
- John J. Rhodes, former U.S. representative from Arizona
- Alice Rivlin, founding director of CBO, former member of Federal Reserve Board of Governors
- Charles Robb, former U.S. senator from Virginia
- Martin Sabo, former chairman of the House Budget Committee
- Charles Schultze, former chairman of the Council of Economic Advisers
- Alan K. Simpson, former Republican senator from Wyoming
- John W. Snow, former secretary of the treasury under George W. Bush
- John Spratt, former House Budget Committee chairman
- Elmer Staats, former U.S. Comptroller General
- Charles Stenholm, former U.S. representative from Texas
- Eugene Steuerle, Senior Fellow at the Urban Institute
- David Stockman, former director of OMB under Reagan, former U.S. representative from Michigan
- Robert Strauss, former chairman of Democratic National Committee
- Lawrence Summers, former Treasury Secretary and director of the National Economic Council
- John Tanner, former U.S. representative from Tennessee
- Tom Tauke, former U.S. representative from Iowa
- Laura Tyson, former chair of the Council of Economic Advisers
- George Voinovich, former U.S. senator from Ohio
- Paul Volcker, former chairman of the Federal Reserve
- Carol Cox Wait, former president of CRFB
- David Walker, former U.S. comptroller general and director of GAO
- Joseph R. Wright, former director of OMB under Ronald Reagan
- Janet Yellen, former chair of the Federal Reserve and United States Secretary of the Treasury

== See also ==
- Fiscal responsibility
- United States federal budget
- United States public debt
- PAYGO
- Peter G. Peterson Foundation
