= C. Eugene Steuerle =

American economist, a Richard B (born 1946)

Gene Steuerle
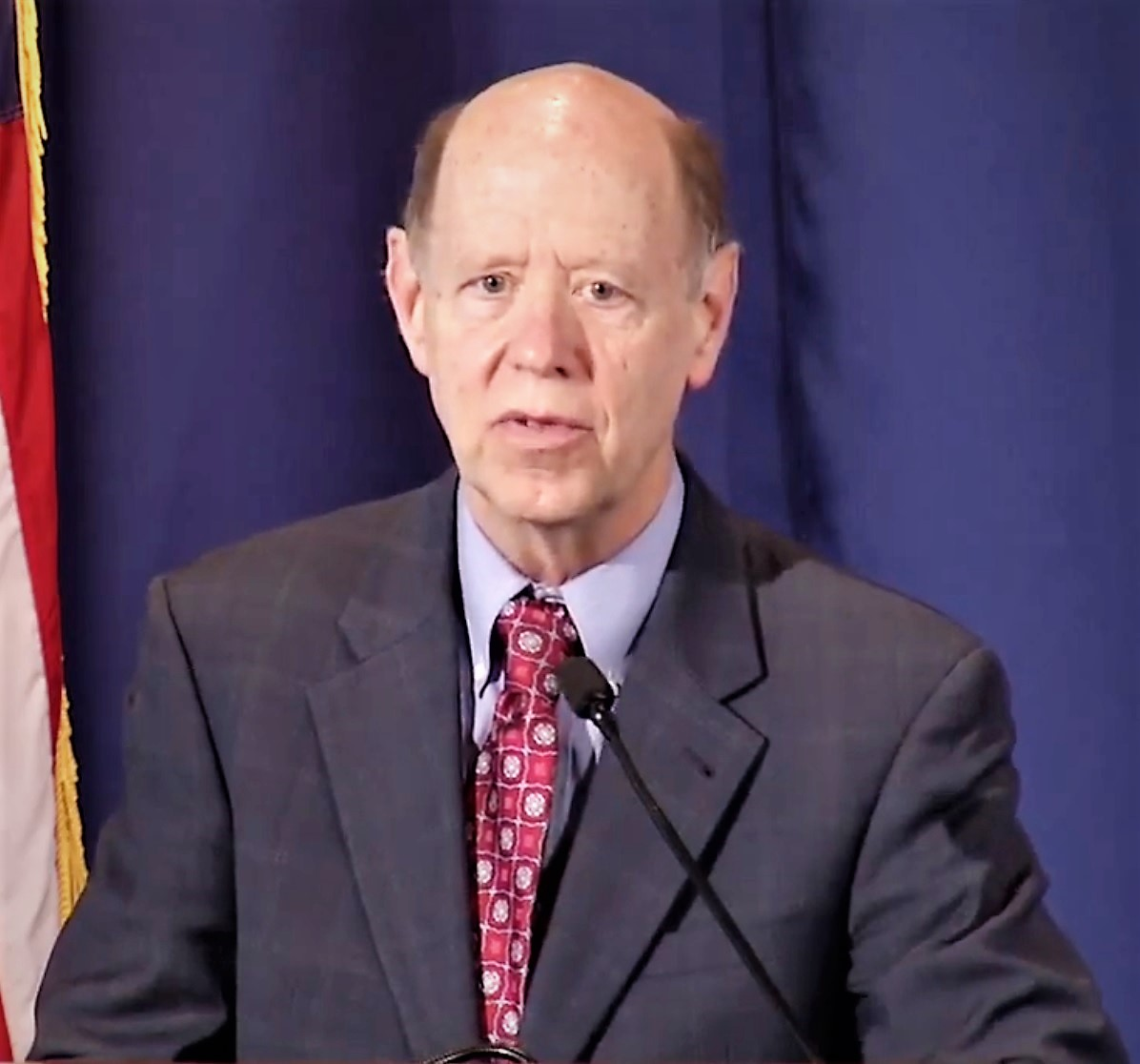
- Born: December 22, 1946 (age 79)
- Education: University of Dayton (BA); University of Wisconsin, Madison (MA, PhD)
- Employer: Urban Institute

C. Eugene "Gene" Steuerle (born December 22, 1946) is an American economist, a Richard B. Fisher chair and Institute Fellow at the Urban Institute in Washington, DC, and a columnist under the title The Government We Deserve.

== Career ==
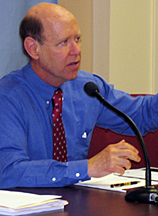
Steuerle at the Urban Institute, 2008

Steuerle has served as:

- Deputy Assistant Secretary of the Treasury for Tax Analysis (1987–1989)
- President of the National Tax Association (2001–2002)
- Chair of the 1999 Technical Panel advising Social Security on its methods and assumptions
- Economic Coordinator and original organizer of the 1984 Treasury study that led to the Tax Reform Act of 1986
- President of the National Economists Club Educational Foundation
- Resident Fellow at the American Enterprise Institute
- Federal Executive Fellow at the Brookings Institution
- Vice-president of the Peter G. Peterson Foundation
- Columnist for the Financial Times
- Institute Fellow and Richard B. Fisher chair at The Urban Institute (current)

He serves or has served on advisory panels or boards for the Congressional Budget Office, the Government Accountability Office, the Joint Committee on Taxation, the Committee for a Responsible Federal Budget, the Independent Sector, the Aspen Institute Initiative on Financial Security, the National Committee on Vital and Health Statistics, and the Partnership for America’s Economic Success, and the Community Foundation for the National Capitol Region. He is also a co-founder of the Alexandria Community Trust (ACT for Alexandria), a community foundation.

== Notable contributions ==
He is Institute Fellow and Richard B. Fisher Chair at the Urban Institute. He has served as Deputy Assistant Secretary of the Treasury for Tax Analysis (1987–1989), President of the National Tax Association (2001–2002), Vice President at the Peter G. Peterson Foundation during its startup phase, co-director of the Urban-Brookings Tax Policy Center, chair of the National Academy of Science Committee on the Use of Economic Evidence, chair of the 1999 Technical Panel advising Social Security on its methods and assumptions, President of the National Economists Club Educational Foundation, Resident Fellow at the American Enterprise Institute, Federal Executive Fellow at the Brookings Institution, and a columnist for Tax Notes Magazine and the Financial Times.

Steuerle is the author, co-author, or co-editor of 18 books and over 1,500 articles, briefs, reports, and Congressional testimonies. Books include Dead Men Ruling, Nonprofits and Government (3rd edition), Contemporary U.S. Tax Policy, and Advancing the Power of Economic Evidence to Inform Investments in Children, Youth, and Families. His column is The Government We Deserve.

He is a cofounder of the Urban-Brookings Tax Policy Center and the Urban Institute’s Center on Nonprofits and Philanthropy as well as its retirement project, Opportunity and Ownership initiative on asset development, and its signature research series, Kids' Share, which traces how children fare in government budgets. He is also a cofounder and chair emeritus of Act for Alexandria, a community foundation

He serves or has served as an elected, appointed, advisory panel, or board member for the Congressional Budget Office, Comptroller General of the United States, the Joint Committee on Taxation, Venture Philanthropy Partners, the National Committee on Vital and Health Statistics, the Independent Sector, the Council on Foundations, the National Academy of Social Insurance, and the Journal of Economic Perspectives, among others.

He is considered a key player and the original organizer of the Treasury's 1984-1986 tax reform. Ronald A. Pearlman, former Assistant Secretary of Tax Policy wrote that the tax reform “would not have moved forward without [Steuerle's] early leadership,” and Lawrence B. Gibbs, former Commissioner of the Internal Revenue Service, stated that "few people have had greater impact on major changes in the tax law and the principal improvements in tax compliance and administration." Andrew Samwick, Director of the Nelson A. Rockefeller Center at Dartmouth College, dubbed Steuerle the "Social Security Czar" for his expertise in Social Security reform.
