= Citizen survey =

A citizen survey is a kind of opinion poll which typically asks the residents of a specific jurisdiction for their perspectives on local issues, such as the quality of life in the community, their level of satisfaction with local government, or their political leanings. Such a survey can be conducted by mail, telephone, Internet, or in person.

Citizen surveys were advanced by Harry Hatry of the Urban Institute, who believed resident opinions to be as necessary to the actions of local government managers and elected officials as customer surveys are to business executives. Local government officials use the data from citizen surveys to assist them in allocating resources for maximum community benefit and forming strategic plans for community programs and policies. Many private firms and universities also conduct their own citizen surveys for similar purposes.

In 1991, the International City and County Manager's Association (ICMA) published a book by Thomas Miller and Michelle Miller Kobayashi titled Citizen Surveys: How To Do Them, How To Use Them, and What They Mean, that directed local government officials in the basic methods for conducting citizen surveys. The book was revised and republished in 2000. In 2001, ICMA partnered with Miller and Kobayashi's organization National Research Center, Inc., to bring The National Citizen Survey, a low-cost survey service, to local governments. National Research Center, Inc. maintains a database of over 500 jurisdictions representing more than 40 million Americans, allowing local governments to compare their cities' results with similar communities nearby or across the nation.
