= Jonathan Schwabish =

Jonathan Schwabish is an economist, speaker, author, and professor at American University and Georgetown University. He is a senior fellow with the Income and Benefits Policy Center at the Urban Institute.

== Education ==
Schwabish earned his undergraduate degree from the University of Wisconsin–Madison studying economics. After receiving his undergraduate degree, he completed a master's degree and a Ph.D. in economics from Johns Hopkins University and Syracuse University respectively.

== Career ==
Schwabish began his career working in the Congressional Budget Office. In this role, he took on policy related to subjects such as food stamp participation and Social Security reform.

After his time at the Congressional Budget Office, Schwabish went to work for Urban Institute, a D.C based think tank, where he sits as a Senior Fellow in their Income and Benefits Policy Center where he aids in presentation design and data visualization. As a Senior Fellow, his research has been centered on disability insurance, retirement security, data measurement, and nutrition policy. In this position, his main goal is to alter how nonprofits, research institutions, and governments relay their data to their consumers.

In addition to The Urban Institute, Schwabish is also a Senior Fellow for the Stanford Center on Poverty and Inequality where his research there is focused on SNAP, data measurement, earnings, income inequality, immigration, disability insurance, retirement security.

Schwabish went on to create PolicyViz which aids clients' data workflow and ensure that they are communicating it to others in the best way possible.

In addition to his Senior Fellow positions, Schwabish is also a professor at American University and Georgetown University, where he teaches courses on effective presentation methods and data communication.

More recently, Schwabish partnered with Alice Feng, senior data scientist at Natera, to apply their experience in data visualization to the growing conversation about race in the wake of the Black Lives Matter movement. They created what is called a "Do No Harm Guide: Applying Equity Awareness in Data Visualization", an evolving document that should serve as an essential resource that offers insight on how principles of diversity, equity, and inclusion can be incorporated into research, analysis, and other data visualizations.

== Publications ==
Jonathin Schwabish has contributed to many briefs, research reports, and working papers during his career as an economist.

=== Briefs ===
- History and Programmatic Overview of the Economic Development Administration
- Economic Development Administration Programs and Types
- Rethinking Economics in the Black Lives Matter Era
- Strategies and Challenges in Feeding Out-of-School Students
- Reforming the Disability Insurance Program Should Start Now
- Understanding Social Security Disability Insurance: Interactions with Other Programs
- Understanding Social Security Disability Programs: Diversity in Beneficiary Experiences and Needs
- The Missing Pieces in Youth-Employment Data Collection and Assessment
- Promoting Social and Economic Mobility in Washington, DC
- Challenges and Choices for the New Mayor: Leveraging the Power of Open Data to Improve City Services

=== Research Reports ===
- Do No Harm Guide: Applying Equity Awareness in Data Visualization
- The Impact of SNAP Able Bodied Adults Without Dependents (ABAWD) Time Limit Reinstatement in Nine States
- Geographic Patterns in Disability Insurance Receipt
- Guide to the Social Genome Project
- Effects of a Higher Minimum Wage in the District of Columbia

=== Working Papers ===
- Best Practices for Moderators

Schwabish has been credited by many notable media and news outlets such as Vox, CNBC, and The New York Times for his contributions and publications.

== Awards/Recognition ==
- Visualization thought leader - AllAnalytics, 2013
- Leader in the field - Mode Analytics, 2016
