= June O'Neill =

June O'Neill could refer to:

- June E. O'Neill, American economist
- June F. O'Neill, former chair of the New York State Democratic Committee
