= New America Foundation =

American think tank

- Abbreviation: New America
- Formation: 1999; 27 years ago
- Founders: Ted Halstead; Sherle Schwenninger; Michael Lind; Walter Russell Mead
- Type: Think tank
- Tax ID no.: 52-2096845
- Headquarters: 740 15th Street NW, Ste 900
- Location: Washington, D.C.
- Chair: Sally R. Osberg
- CEO: Paul Butler
- Revenue: $37,233,867 (2024)
- Expenses: $41,339,553 (2024)
- Staff: 196 (2024)
- Volunteers: 17 (2024)
- Website: newamerica.org

New America, legally the New America Foundation, is an American think tank founded in 1999. Its work covers public policy areas including national security, technology, health, gender, energy, education, and the economy. It has offices in Washington, D.C. and Oakland, California. As of 2026, Paul Butler serves as interim chief executive officer.

== History ==
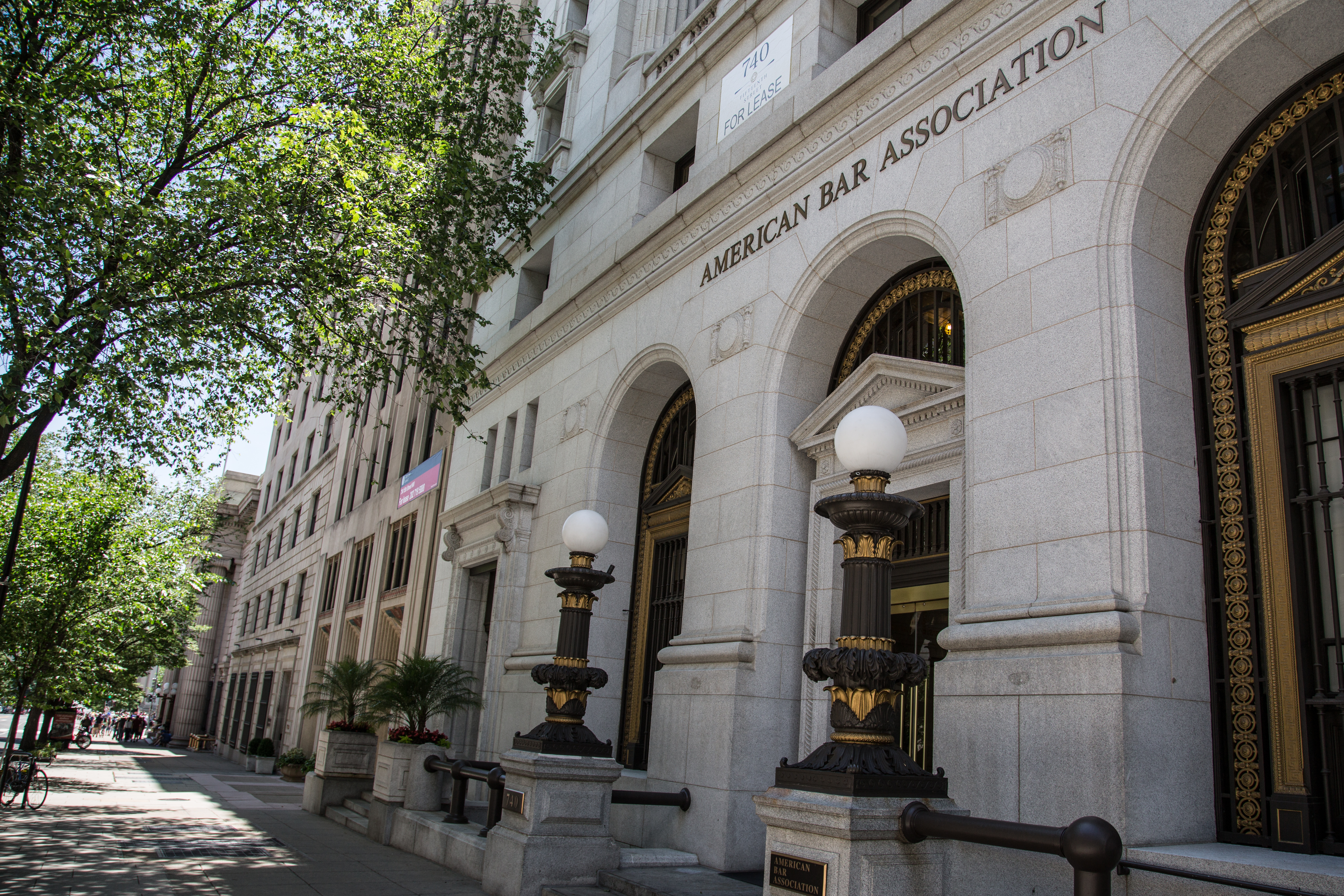
New America Foundation's headquarters in Washington, D.C.

=== Founding and early years ===
New America Foundation was founded in 1999 by Ted Halstead, Sherle Schwenninger, Michael Lind, and Walter Russell Mead. Bill Moyers, Norman Lear, and members of the Rockefeller family were early financial backers. The organization is headquartered in Washington, D.C.

In 2001, Halstead and Lind published The Radical Center: The Future of American Politics, which argued that American politics could realign around centrist policies. The New York Times has claimed that the book is "in effect the foundation's mission statement." During New America Foundation's first two years, its budget tripled to $3 million.

Ted Halstead served as New America Foundation's founding president and CEO starting in 1999.

=== Leadership changes and policy work ===
Steve Coll, a former managing editor at the Washington Post, took over for Halstead in 2007. Anne-Marie Slaughter, a Princeton professor and former State Department official, succeeded Coll as CEO in 2013.

In the 2000s, New America Foundation's Len Nichols and Jacob Hacker advocated for healthcare reform built around a public option, a health insurance mandate, and an increase in taxes to provide subsidies for Americans who could not afford insurance.

In September 2011, Maya MacGuineas, who had previously worked for the Brookings Institution as well as on Wall Street, formed Fix the Debt, a campaign for tax reform and deficit reduction that included businesspeople and politicians such as Erskine Bowles, Alan Simpson, and Mark Warner. MacGuineas ran the campaign out of New America Foundation's offices.

The foundation's Economic Growth Program, directed by New America Foundation co-founders Sherle Schwenninger and Michael Lind, aimed to take a policy look at America and the world's economic problems. In 2011, the program commissioned a paper "The Way Forward: Moving From the Post-Bubble, Post-Bust Economy to Renewed Growth and Competitiveness".

=== Open Markets Program and later developments ===
On June 27, 2017, Barry C. Lynn, the director of the anti-monopoly Open Markets program at New America Foundation, issued a statement, praising the European Commission's €2.42 billion antitrust fine against Google, one of the organization's main sponsors. The statement was temporarily removed from New America's website before being restored.

According to The Guardian, Google executive and former New America chairman Eric Schmidt contacted New America president Anne-Marie Slaughter following the publication of the statement to express his displeasure. New America had received approximately $21 million from Google, Schmidt, and his family's foundation since 1999. On August 30, 2017, it became known that Lynn was fired, and the Open Markets program was closed. According to The New York Times, Lynn alleged that New America did it to please Google.

In response to the decision to fire Lynn and his team, 25 former and current employees of the think tank signed a letter expressing concern about the extent to which sponsors are influencing New America's work. Lynn and his colleagues, including competition law scholar Lina Khan, had lauded the EU's antitrust ruling against Google. New America's president Anne-Marie Slaughter denied the allegations of improper influence by Google and said that New America had already been working to spin off Open Markets as an independent organization.

In 2021, Paul Butler, formerly COO of the consulting firm Sparks & Honey, joined New America Foundation as its president and chief transformation officer.

In July 2026, Anne-Marie Slaughter stepped down as New America Foundation's CEO. She was replaced on an interim basis by Paul Butler.

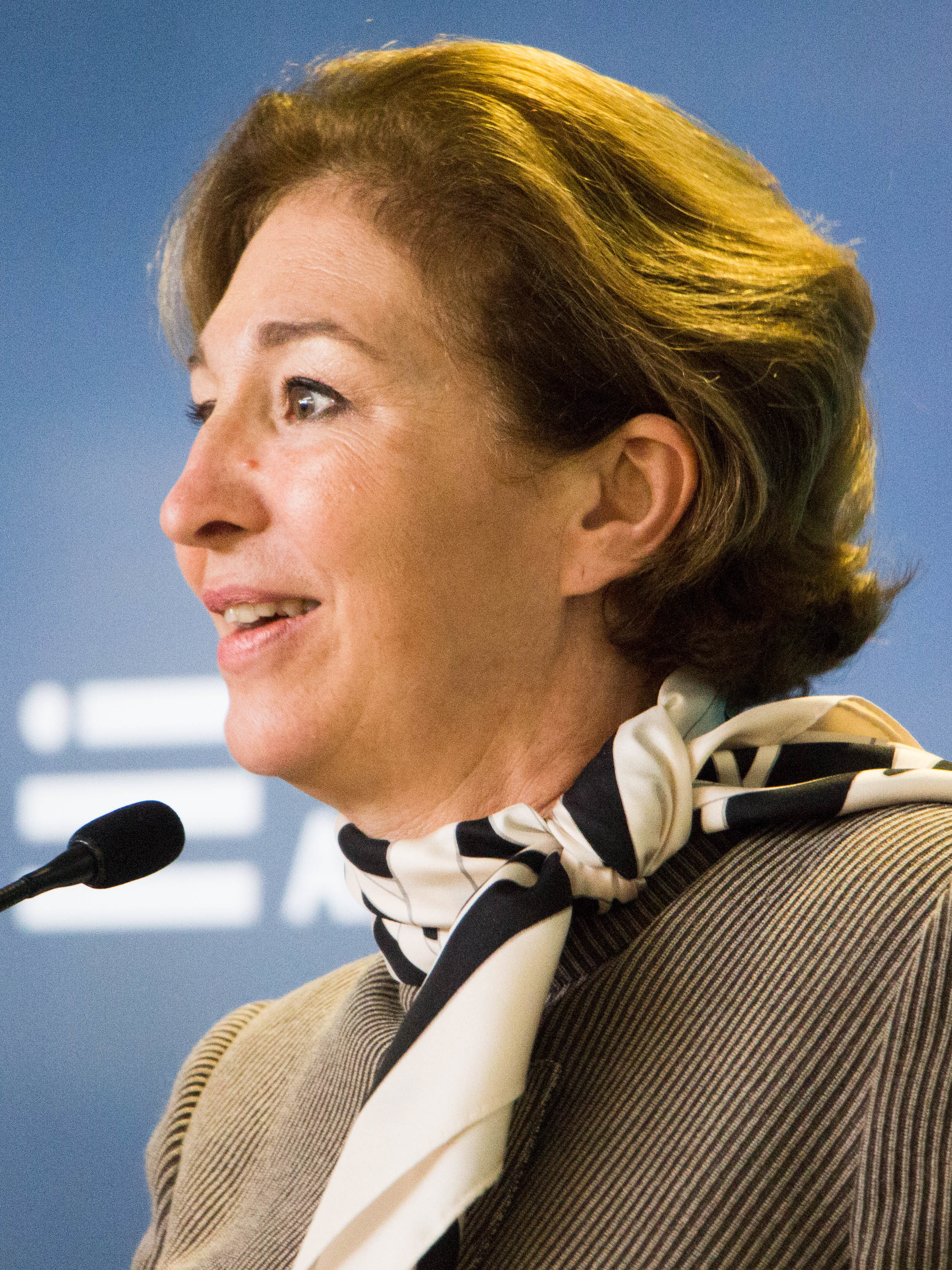
Anne-Marie Slaughter, CEO of New America

== Political stances ==
New America Foundation has been characterized as "liberal" by the Pacific Standard online magazine, "left-leaning" by The Washington Post, and "left-of-center" by the Capital Research Center organization. It has been described as "nonpartisan" by the Washington Post, New York Times, and the New Republic.

=== Technology ===
New America Foundation operates the Open Technology Institute, which develops technologies and supports public policy meant to protect internet freedom and promote competition within the telecommunications field.

In the 2010s, the OTI developed Commotion Wireless an open source "device-as-infrastructure" communication platform designed to integrate users' wireless-capable devices to create community-sized peer-to-peer communications networks. Ultimately, the project did not prove sustainable. The relevant code development profiles for the project have not been updated since 2016, and the project's website has been offline since approximately September 2024. One relatively successful offshoot of the Commotion project is Red Hook Wi-Fi, a mesh network that serves residents of Red Hook, Brooklyn, in New York City. In 2012, when Hurricane Sandy shut down many internet and communication systems throughout the city, Red Hook remained connected through its mesh network.

In 2012, New America Foundation joined Free Press and Public Knowledge in a lawsuit against AT&T claiming that the company's blocking of Facetime constituted a violation of the FCC's net neutrality rules. New America argued against the Trump administration FCC's 2017 repeal of net neutrality regulations and developed model legislation that state lawmakers could use to protect net neutrality within their states. In 2025, after the Biden administration FCC's reinstatement of net neutrality regulations was blocked by the 6th U.S. Circuit Court of Appeals, New America asked the court to reconsider its ruling.

In 2019, New America Foundation founded the Public Interest Technology University Network, which creates educational programs meant to help students develop and advocate for technologies that benefit the public. As of 2020, the network had 22 members including Harvard, Howard, Stanford, and MIT.

=== Education ===
New America Foundation has conducted research identifying states well-suited for Race to the Top grants and assessed the quality of various early education programs.

In 2018, New America launched the Partnership to Advance Youth Apprenticeship (PAYA), a national initiative with the National Governors Association and other organizations that supports state and local efforts to provide high school students with work-based learning opportunities and apprenticeship programs.

In 2024, New America launched the Accelerator for Community Colleges in the Innovation Economy, a $3 million initiative funded by Ascendium Education Group to support community and technical colleges participating in the National Science Foundation's Regional Innovation Engines. The program provided participating colleges with networking opportunities, guidance on best practices, policy engagement, and assistance with workforce development in emerging technologies.

In 2026, the think tank launched the National Commission on Learning Ecosystems, a two-year initiative examining partnerships between schools and community organizations intended to expand learning opportunities beyond the classroom. In the same year, New America published a report on financial aid leveraging, a practice in which colleges offer aid to relatively affluent, high-achieving students while leaving lower-income students to take on loans they may not be able to pay back. The organization has also argued for the elimination of federal student loans in favor of allocating federal money to states on the condition that the states increase higher education funding and hold colleges accountable for performance and costs.

Emmy Liss, a former educational consultant for New America, serves as New York City's head of childcare.

=== Political reform ===
In 2021, New America Foundation published a study on ranked choice voting. The study found that it tends to be more popular with younger and Democratic voters than older and Republican ones. It also found that a large majority of voters believe they have a strong understanding of how the ranked choice system works.

In 2024, only eight percent of congressional races in the U.S. were decided by less than five percentage points. New America has argued for fusion voting in order to produce a greater number of competitive races. The organization has also proposed proportional representation as a method for better representing minority views within individual congressional districts.

=== National security ===
New America Foundation maintains a database of post-9/11 terrorist attacks in the United States. The information in this database has demonstrated that the vast majority of attacks on U.S. soil have been committed by American citizens or permanent residents, as opposed to foreigners. New America's research in this area was widely cited in news coverage critical of the Trump administration's 2017 travel ban. In 2017, New America fellows met with White House officials to discuss a counterterrorism strategy that took into account both domestic and foreign threats to the nation's security.

New America also maintains a database that measures the frequency and effect of U.S. drone strikes, including the military and civilian casualties produced by those strikes.

New America's Future Frontlines program has also conducted open-source investigations of the Russian Wagner Group, examining its personnel, business networks, and involvement in conflicts abroad.

=== Family care ===
A 2016 New America Foundation report found that full-time out-of-home care for children under the age of four costs the American family an average of $9,589 per year and that in-home care costs an average of $28,353 per year. The report argued that these high costs harm the labor market. New America fellow Vicki Shabo has advocated for paid parental leave policies in order to ease the financial burden.

In 2026, New America Foundation's New Practice Lab published a survey that asked approximately 5,500 parents of young children about their work lives, childcare arrangements, use of parental leave, and hopes for the future. The survey found that 72% of parents wish they could spend more quality time with their kids and that 52% of parents consider money and affordability a barrier to doing so. The survey also found that 55% of parents wish that they could have taken longer parental leave following the birth of their children.

== Fellows program ==
Founded in 1999, New America’s Fellows Program was established to support journalists, scholars, and other thinkers in developing ambitious work for broad public audiences. Over its first 25 years, the program supported nearly 300 fellows whose work included more than 180 books, 19 feature-length films, and long-form journalism. Fellows have included legal scholar Tim Wu, who coined the term “net neutrality” in 2003; Virginia Eubanks, author of Automating Inequality; and climate journalist David Wallace-Wells, author of The Uninhabitable Earth. Other fellows have included Joshua Geltzer, Timothy Shenk, Gideon Lewis-Kraus, Patrick Radden Keefe, Souad Mekhennet, Peter Bergen, Mei Fong, Liza Mundy, Peter Beinart, and Noah Feldman. New America fellows Andrea Elliott won the 2022 Pulitzer Prize for General Nonfiction for Invisible Child, while Brian Goldstone received the same award in 2026 for There Is No Place for Us. New America fellow Emily Kassie co-directed Sugarcane, which was nominated for the Academy Award for Best Documentary Feature in 2025.

== Assets and funding ==
New America Foundation is registered as a non-profit under section 501(c)(3) of the United States Internal Revenue Code. Its financial information is publicly available through annual IRS Form 990 filings and independent audits. For the financial year of 2024, the organization reported revenue of approximately $37.2 million and expenses of $41.3 million. Its total assets for the same period were recorded at $81.4 million, and a net asset position of $52.3 million.

The organization maintains a funding disclosure policy and publishes a list of institutional donors on its website. Top institutional donors in recent years have included the Bill & Melinda Gates Foundation, Bloomberg Philanthropies, the Carnegie Corporation of New York, the Ford Foundation, Google, Alphabet, the MacArthur Foundation, and the Rockefeller Foundation.

== Board of directors ==
New America Foundation's board leadership has changed several times since the organization's founding. In November 2017, Lenny Mendonca was appointed chair of the board. He was succeeded in September 2019 by Helene D. Gayle, who served as chair until 2023. Following her tenure, Gayle has continued to serve as a member of the board. In January 2024, the organization announced the addition of Don Katz and Patrick Radden Keefe as new board members.

As of 2025, the chair of the board is Sally R. Osberg, with Monica C. Lozano and Todd Park serving as vice chairs.
