= Jennifer Ackerman =

American nature writer

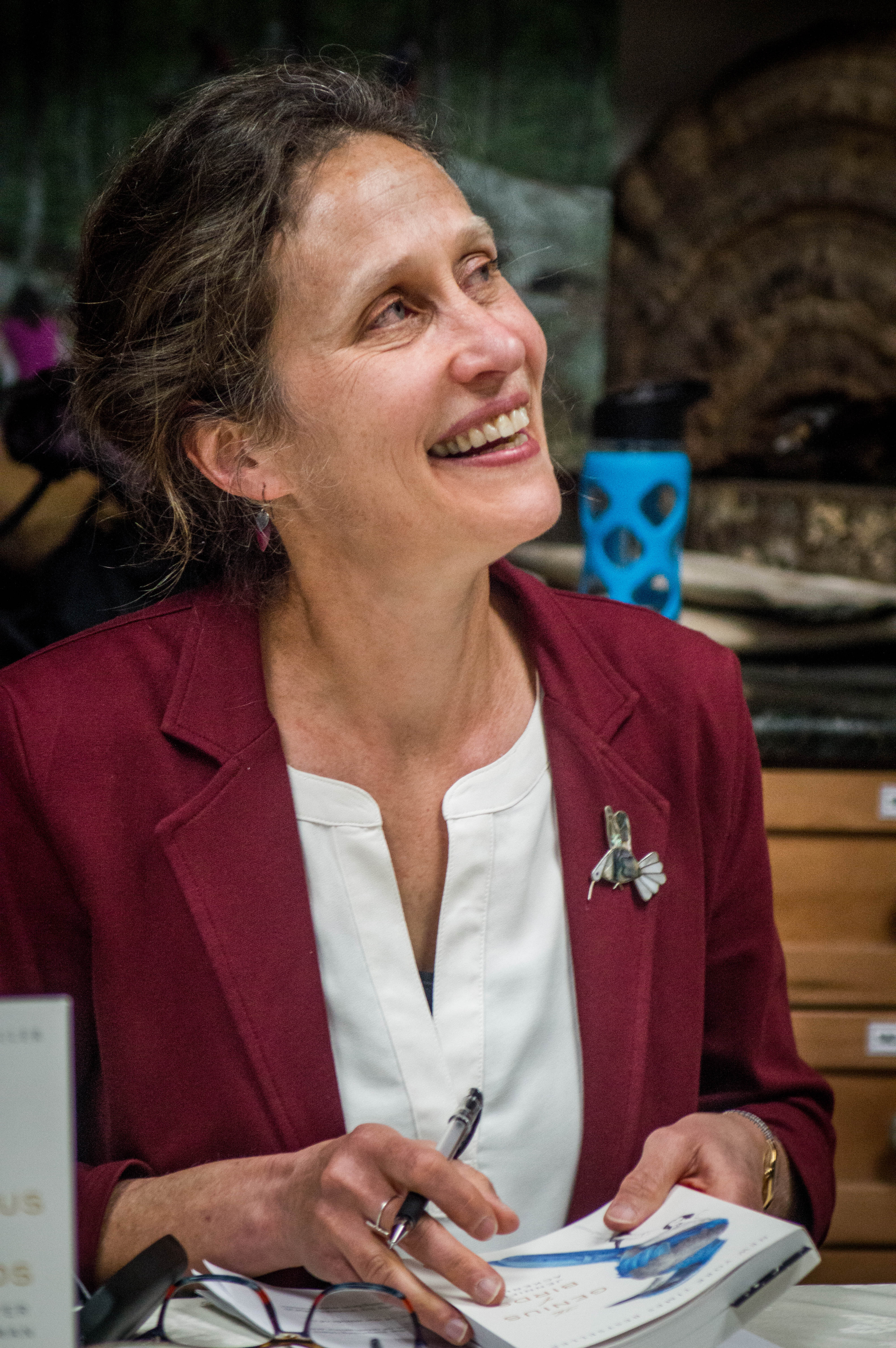
- Ackerman in 2017
- Occupation: Writer
- Known for: The Genius of Birds

Jennifer Ackerman (born 1959) is an American author known for her ornithology books, including the bestselling book The Genius of Birds.

In that book, Ackerman posits that, contrary to popular metaphors such as "bird brained," birds are actually quite intelligent and think in complex ways. Called a "peppy survey of the science of bird intelligence" by The Guardian, the book was a New York Times best seller in 2017. She followed up on this idea in her 2020 book The Bird Way combining personal observations and a literature review of the latest in bird research to discuss various aspects of bird life. She was the narrator for the audiobook version of both books.

Ackerman is the author of eight books which have been published in more than 20 languages. In addition to her published books, she is also a contributing writer to Scientific American, National Geographic, and The New York Times. She worked for National Geographic for nine years, editing their well-known book The Curious Naturalist. She left that job to write freelance and spent time in Lewes, Delaware, researching the coastal area and writing her book Notes From the Shore which was reissued as Birds By the Shore in 2019.

Her earlier books focus on health topics, from the Strong Women's Guide to Total Health which she wrote with Miriam Nelson, to her book Sex Sleep Eat Drink Dream which uses the framework of a single day to discuss a wide variety of things going on in the human body at various times.

== Awards and fellowships ==
- Established Artist Fellowship from the Delaware Arts Council (1995)
- Fellowships: Bunting Institute of Radcliffe Institute (1997-1998)
- Alfred P. Sloan Foundation grant (1998)
- Fellowship: Brown College at the University of Virginia (2001)
- National Endowment for the Arts Literature Fellowship in Nonfiction (2004)
- Silver Medal Award for Nature Writing from the International Regional Magazine Association (2005)
- Fellowship: Tisch College of Citizenship and Public Service at Tufts University (2007-2010)
- Whitley Award for Behavioural Zoology (2021)
- National Outdoor Book Award (2023) in "Outdoor Literature" for What an Owl Knows

== Early life and education ==
Ackerman was born in 1959 to economist William Gorham and Kathryn Joan (Aring) Morton in Omaha, Nebraska. She used to go birding with her father along the Chesapeake and Ohio Canal. She attended Yale and graduated cum laude with a B.A. in 1980. She moved to Lewes, Delaware in 1989 for three years, and then to Charlottesville, Virginia in 1992. She was married to late novelist Karl Ackerman in 1980, and they have two daughters.

== Bibliography ==
- Curious Naturalist (1998 ISBN 0792273567)
- Chance in the House of Fate: a natural history of heredity (2001 ISBN 0618082875)
- Sex Sleep Eat Drink Dream: a day in the life of your body (2007 ISBN 0618187588)
- Ah-Choo: the uncommon life of the common cold (2010 ISBN 044654115X)
- Strong Women's Guide to Total Health (with Miriam Nelson 2010 ISBN 1594867798)
- The Genius of Birds (2016 ISBN 1594205213)
- Birds by the Shore: Observing the Natural Life of the Atlantic Coast (2019 ISBN 0143134183)
- The Bird Way: A New Look at How Birds Talk, Work, Play, Parent, and Think (2020 ISBN 0735223017)
- What an Owl Knows: The New Science of the World's Most Enigmatic Birds (2023 ISBN 0593298888)
