= Emmy Liss =

New York City Executive Director of the Mayor's Office of Child Care (2026-)

Executive Director of the New York City Mayor's Office of Child Care
- Incumbent
- Assumed office January 1, 2026
- Mayor: Zohran Mamdani

Personal details
- Party: Democratic
- Education: Brown University (BA)

Emmy Liss is an American civil servant and education policy leader who currently serves as the Executive Director of the Mayor's Office of Child Care in New York City, under Mayor Zohran Mamdani, where she has become known for leading the implementation of one of his core policy goals, universal child care. She previously served as Chief Operating Officer for the Division of Early Childhood Education in NYC and co-founded New Yorkers United for Child Care.

== Biography ==
Liss earned a BA in political science from Brown University. After graduation, she began working at McKinsey & Company in their Education practice.

In 2015, she began working for the New York City Department of Education, where she rose to the rank of Chief Operating Officer for the Division of Early Childhood Education and played a role in the implementation of universal preschool during the Bill de Blasio mayorship.

She left the Department of Education when Eric Adams took office and co-founded New Yorkers United for Child Care to oppose preschool funding cuts during that period. During this period, she was also notable for her prolific authoring of education and child care policy memos for organizations including the 5BORO Institute, New America, and the Day Care Council of New York, and has been cited as one of the key leaders in policy dissemination and engaging important constituencies with the issue of universal child care.

She was named the Executive Director of the Mayor's Office of Child Care by Zohran Mamdani just before Mamdani's inauguration. In this role, she has improved communication regarding universal 3K and Pre-K and taken the lead in implementing Universal 2K, a policy priority of Mamdani which received funding from the State of New York and Governor Kathy Hochul. Notably, as of April 10, the City had announced free child care for 2,000 two-year-olds in high-need areas, as well as opening an additional 1,000 slots for three-year-olds. The goal set by both Mamdani and Liss is to achieve universal child care for all children under 5.
