= The Genius of Birds =

2016 book by Jennifer Ackerman

- First edition (US)
- Author: Jennifer Ackerman
- Language: English
- Subject: Bird intelligence
- Publisher: Penguin Press
- Publication date: April 12 2016
- Pages: 352
- Awards: New York Times Bestseller
- ISBN: 1594205213

The Genius of Birds is a 2016 book by nature writer Jennifer Ackerman.

== Content ==
The Genius of Birds highlights new findings and discoveries in the field of bird intelligence. The book explores birds as thinkers (contrary to the cliché "bird brain") in the context of observed behavior in the wild and brings to it the scientific findings from lab and field research.

New research suggests that some birds, such as those in the family Corvidae, can rival primates and even humans in forms of intelligence. Though birds have small brains relative to their size, their brains contain "large numbers of neurons". Like humans, these connections between brain cells that "matter in the matter of intelligence."

Ackerman highlights the complex social structures of avian society. They are capable of abstract thinking, problem solving, recognising faces, gift giving, sharing, grieving, and meaningful communication with humans. Ackerman goes in depth to highlight scientific studies that uncover behavior such as tool usage, speaking in regional accents, navigation and theory of mind.

== Reception ==
The book is a New York Times Best Seller and was named one of the 10 best nonfiction books of 2016 by The Wall Street Journal.

== Translations ==
- Finnish: Viisaat linnut. Translated by Heli Naski. Jyväskylä: Atena. 2017. ISBN 9789523003293.
- German: Die Genies der Lüfte. Translated by Christel Dormagen. Hamburg: Rowohlt. 2017. ISBN 9783498000981.
- Norwegian: Fuglenes fantastiske liv, lit. 'The Wonderful Life of Birds'. Translated by Rune R. Moen. Oslo: Gyldenhal. 2017. ISBN 9788205500464.
- Polish: Geniusz ptaków. Translated by Barbara Gutowska-Nowak. Kraków: Wydawnictwo Uniwersytetu Jagiellońskiego. 2017. ISBN 9788323343332.
- Spanish: El ingenio de los pájaros. Translated by Gemma Deza Guil. Barcelona: Ariel. 2017. ISBN 9788434425262.
- Czech: Genialita ptáků. Translated by Vendula Hlavová. Brno: Nakladatelství Kazda. 2018. ISBN 9788090742062.
- Estonian: Geniaalsed linnud. Translated by Helen Urbanik. Tallinn: Tänapäev. 2018. ISBN 9789949852642.
- Chinese: 鸟类的天赋; pinyin: Niǎo lèi de tiānfù. Translated by Shen Hanzhong and Li Siqi. Nanjing: Yilin Press. 2019. ISBN 9787544774970.
- Lithuanian: Genialieji paukščiai. Translated by Kasparas Pocius. Vilnius: Kitos knygos. 2019. ISBN 9786094273360.
- Catalan: L'enginy dels ocells. Translated by Laura Patricio Sedano. Ribaroja del Túria: Cossetània Edicions. 2023. ISBN 9788413562544.
