= Robert Reischauer =

American economist

Bob Reischauer

3rd Director of the Congressional Budget Office
- In office March 6, 1989 – February 28, 1995
- Preceded by: James Blum (acting)
- Succeeded by: June E. O'Neill

Personal details
- Born: Robert Danton Reischauer; 1941 (age 84–85)
- Party: Democratic
- Relatives: Edwin O. Reischauer (father)
- Education: Harvard University (BA); Columbia University (MIA, PhD)

Robert Danton Reischauer (born 1941) is an economist and was one of the two public trustees of the Medicare and Social Security Trust Fund. He is a nationally known expert on the federal budget, health reform, Medicare, and Social Security. Most recently (2000–2012) he served as president of the Urban Institute, a think tank based in Washington, D.C. He is the son of Japan scholar Edwin O. Reischauer.

== Career ==
=== Congressional Budget Office ===
Reischauer was director of the Congressional Budget Office (CBO) from 1989 to 1995. He helped Alice Rivlin set up the CBO in 1975, and served as the assistant director for human resources and its deputy director between 1977 and 1981.

=== Urban Institute and Brookings Institution ===
Reischauer served as senior vice president of the Urban Institute from 1981 to 1986. He was a senior fellow of economic studies at the Brookings Institution from 1986 to 1989 and from 1995 to 2000. He began his tenure as the second president of the Urban Institute in February 2000 and left that role in 2012.

=== Board memberships and commentary ===
Reischauer serves on the boards of several educational and nonprofit organizations, including the Committee for a Responsible Federal Budget. He was a member of the Medicare Payment Advisory Commission from 2000 to 2009 and was its vice chair from 2001 to 2008. He frequently contributes to the opinion pages of the nation's major newspapers, comments on public policy developments on radio and television, and testifies before congressional committees.

Reischauer was a senior fellow of the Harvard Corporation from 2010 to 2014.

== Education ==
Reischauer attended Harvard University (A.B. in political science) and Columbia University (M.I.A. in international relations and Ph.D. in economics).

== Bibliography ==
- Robert Danton Reischauer; Robert W. Hartman (1973). Reforming school finance. Brookings Institution. ISBN 978-0-8157-7396-2.
- Henry J. Aaron; Robert Danton Reischauer (2001). Countdown to Reform: The Great Social Security Debate. Century Foundation Press. ISBN 978-0-87078-462-0.

Non-profit organization positions
Preceded by William Gorham	President of the Urban Institute; 2000–2012	Succeeded by Sarah Rosen Wartell
