= Fix the Debt =

Fix the Debt is a group of executives and former legislators who campaign for deficit reduction and tax reform. The Campaign to Fix the Debt was founded in July 2012 by Erskine Bowles and Alan Simpson. In September 2012 they wrote, "If we can't get members of Congress to put aside their ultra-partisanship and pull together rather than apart, we face the most predictable economic crisis in history." The Campaign comprises a variety of socio-economic and political views and engages business and government leaders alongside American citizens.

== Leadership ==
Fix the Debt is chaired by Judd Gregg and Edward Rendell. In March 2017 they wrote of rising national debt, "Both parties have contributed to the problem, and leaders in both are unwilling to ruffle feathers and make the tough choices needed." They said of gross national debt exceeding $22 trillion in February 2019, "This milestone is another sad reminder of the inexcusable tab our nation's leaders continue to run up and will leave for the next generation."

== Steering committee ==
As of 12 May 2017, the campaign's steering committee comprises the following members:

- Michael Bloomberg
- Phil Bredesen
- Kent Conrad
- David M. Cote
- Pete Domenici
- Vic Fazio
- Jim McCrery
- Sam Nunn
- Michael Peterson
- Steven Rattner
- Alice Rivlin
- Scott Smith
- Antonio Villaraigosa
- Robert Zoellick

== History ==
The campaign was launched in late 2012 with print, digital, and outdoor advertisements and chapters across 17 states. One of the campaign's primary contributors was Peter George Peterson, a billionaire investor and former chairman and CEO of Lehman Brothers. Other early members included Ed Rendell, Judd Gregg, and Maya MacGuineas, who became the campaign's official spokesperson. In December 2012, MacGuineas said, “We want a deal to happen, and want it to happen in a bipartisan way, because otherwise it’s not going to stick.”

Over 300,000 people signed a petition demanding that policymakers fix the debt. The group's influence in the corporate sector quickly grew, as early members David M. Cote, Mark Bertolini, and Larry Fink began recruiting other big business associates. By November 2012, the organization's CEO Council was composed of approximately 150 executives. In the financial sector, Steven Rattner and James B. Lee, Jr. became the lead recruiters. The campaign proposed a July 4, 2013 deadline for a deficit reduction plan akin to the Simpson-Bowles plan, but was met with resistance at the grassroots and governmental levels. In a 2013 interview with the New Hampshire Union Leader, Cote identified the problem of debt reduction in the United States as being the fact that "Washington is ruled by fear of voters ... and the three 'h's' prevail—hysteria, histrionics and hyperbole". He also framed the options for deficit reduction in terms of increases in taxes and/or spending cuts.

In 2015, the campaign identified three goals in the 2016 presidential election: to incentivize candidates to create and follow through on fiscal strategies, to increase engagement with the public and the media on relevant issues, and to hold candidates responsible for statements made on fiscal policy. Following the November 2016 Presidential election and going into 2017, Rattner sought to explain growing divide within the campaign and the CEO Council's shifting focus from shrinking the debt to tax cuts as not being contradictory.

== Criticism ==
The Fix the Debt campaign has been criticized since its inception for supporting corporate tax breaks while calling for cutting funds to Social Security and Medicare. Kevin Connor, director of the Public Accountability Initiative, as quoted in The New York Times, identified a possible conflict of interest between the broad objectives of the group and the reality of their day to day lobbying of Washington for favorable tax treatment of their own industries and continued government spending on programs that benefit their companies. He also pointed out that the group calls for a reduction in government spending on social security but not on defence spending, a major business area for Honeywell. "It’s easier to get face time in Washington as a deficit hawk than as a corporate hack," he said, continuing "They are spending millions, but they are protecting billions in defense contracts and tax giveaways that would otherwise be on the chopping block."
