= David M. Cote =

American businessman (born 1952)

David Cote
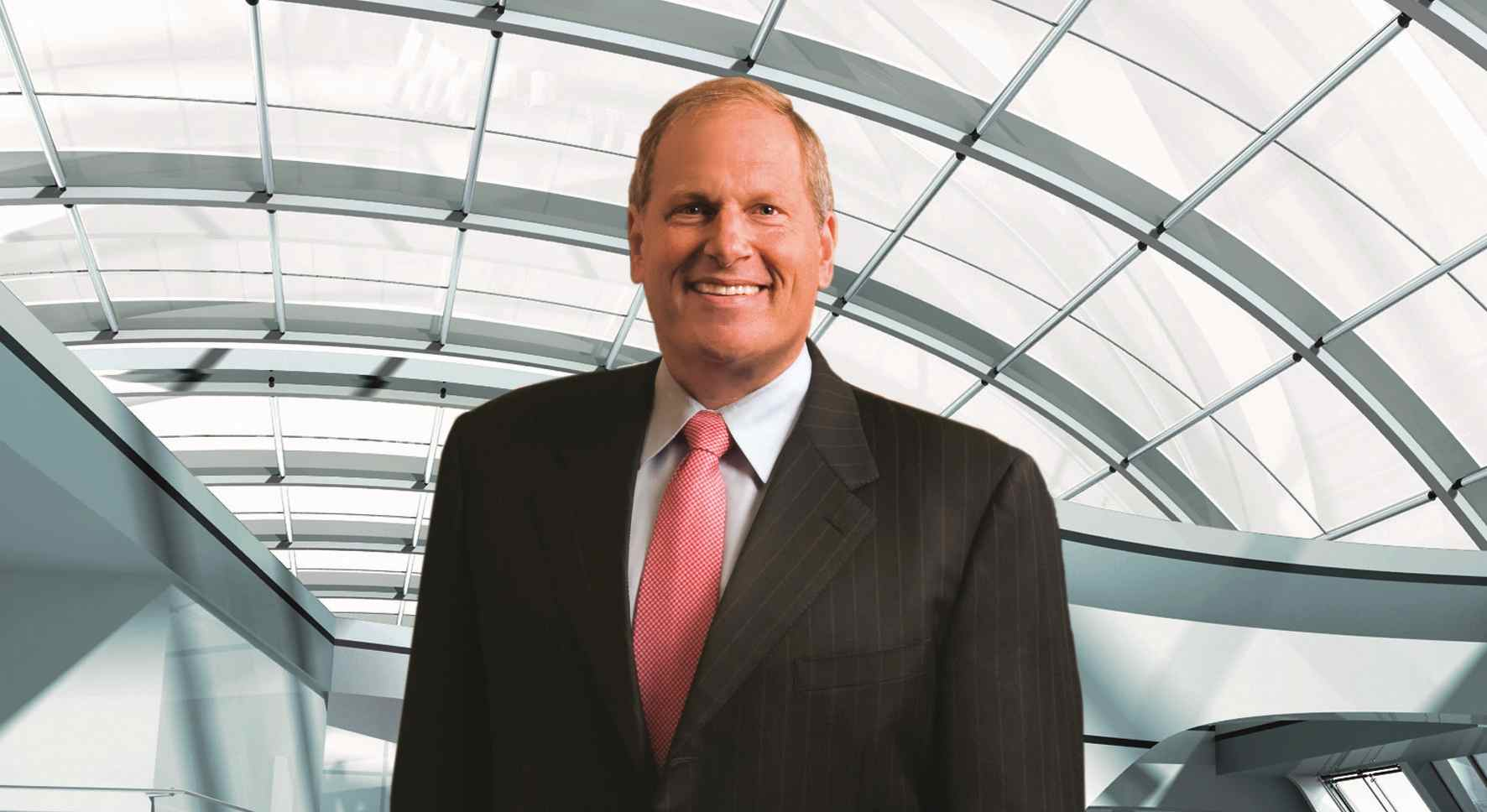
- Born: David M. Cote; July 19, 1952 (age 74); Manchester, New Hampshire, U.S.
- Education: Pembroke Academy; University of New Hampshire
- Children: 3 (2 from first marriage, 1 from second)

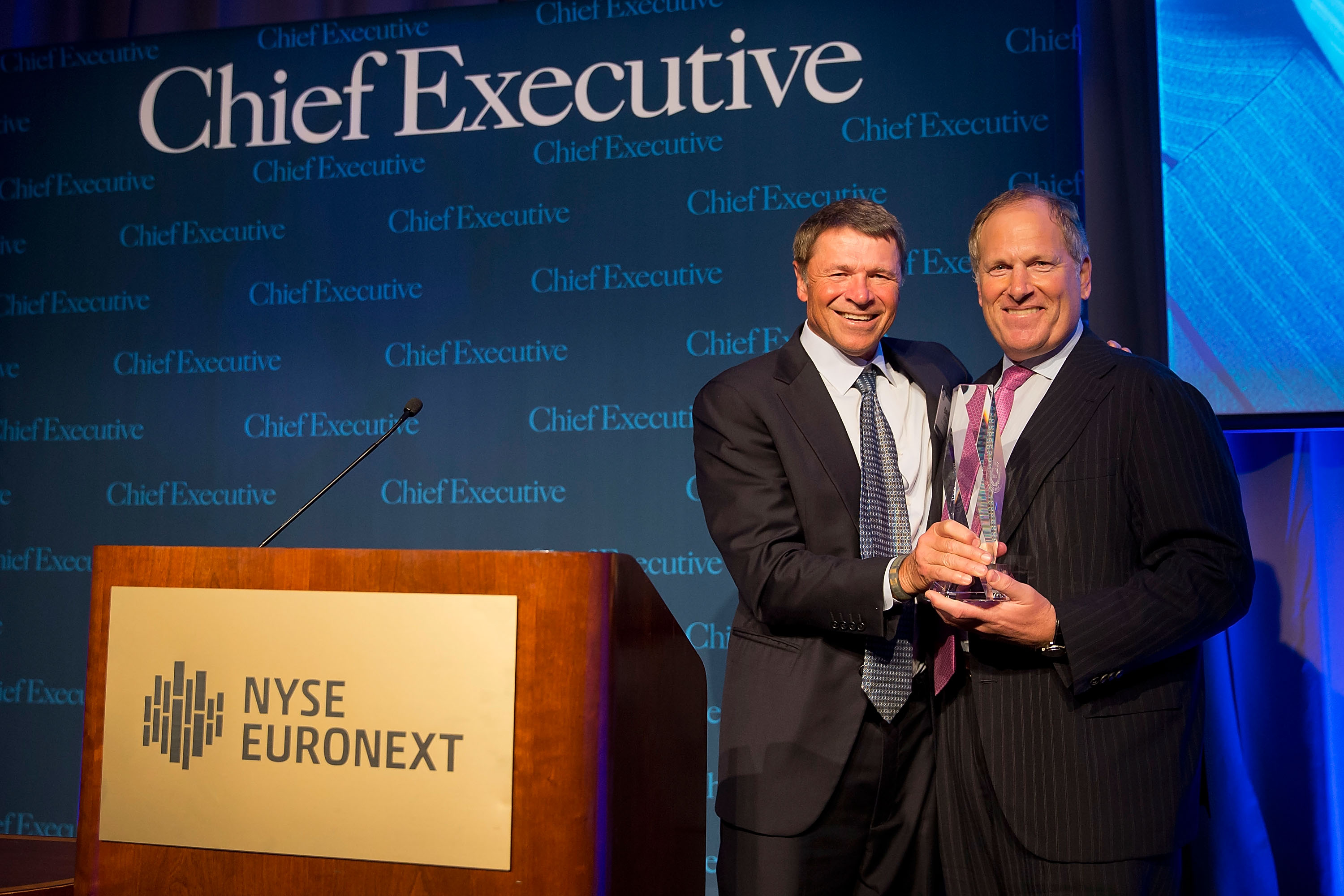
Dave Cote presented CEO of Year Award 2013

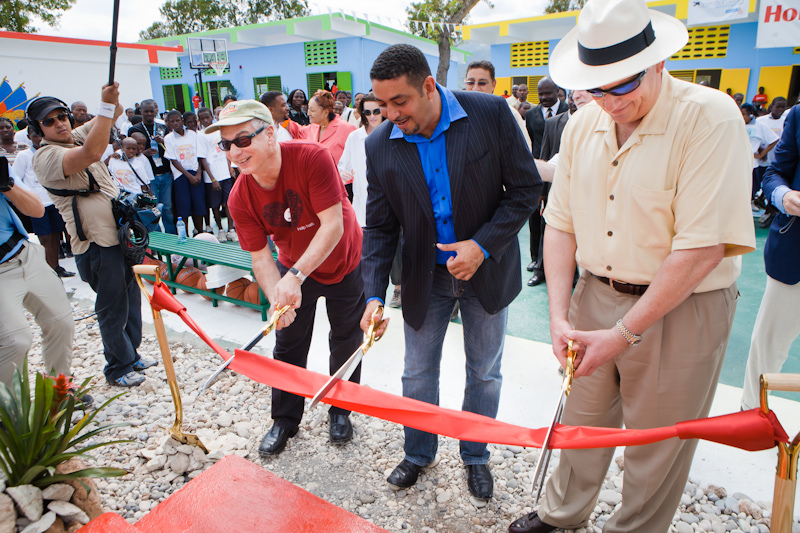
Cote cuts the ribbon with Richard Walden to open the Ecole Nationale Jacob Martin Henriquez school in Jacmel, Haiti on March 11, 2011.

David M. Cote (born July 19, 1952) is an American businessman. Cote previously worked for General Electric and TRW Inc. before he was appointed chairman and chief executive officer (CEO) of Honeywell in 2002, following their acquisition by AlliedSignal. Cote also sat on the JP Morgan Chase risk committee during the period in which the firm lost $6 billion trading credit derivatives. Cote stepped down as CEO at Honeywell at the end of March 2017 and was succeeded by Darius Adamczyk. Cote is currently the executive chairman of Vertiv.

== Early life ==
Cote was born in Manchester, New Hampshire, and graduated from Pembroke Academy in Pembroke, New Hampshire, in 1970. The following year, Cote enrolled at the University of New Hampshire, and while attending UNH full-time, he worked an hourly job on the night shift at a nearby GE jet engine plant. In 1976, he graduated from the University of New Hampshire with a bachelor's degree in business administration.

== Career ==
=== General Electric ===
Cote joined General Electric full-time in November 1976, and worked there for more than twenty years. He transitioned from his hourly production work at the General Electric aircraft-engine plant in New Hampshire to a full-time auditing job at another GE plant in Massachusetts. In 1985, his handling of an interaction with CEO Jack Welch became the catalyst for Cote's advancement at GE. Welch promoted Cote three levels of management. Over his career there, he held positions in manufacturing, finance, marketing, strategic planning and general management, before becoming CEO of GE Appliances in 1996.

=== TRW ===
In November 1999, Cote joined TRW as president and COO where he introduced the Six Sigma management system to reduce defects in manufacturing. In February 2001, Cote was appointed CEO, and later chairman of the board. Cote led the creation of the TRW subsidiary Velocium, which manufactured ultra-high-speed semiconductors.

In February 2002, Cote announced he would be leaving TRW. Reportedly, the news surprised employees and some executives, who learned of Cote's departure hours before the announcement.

=== Honeywell ===
Honeywell selected Cote as successor to Lawrence Bossidy, following the AlliedSignal acquisition of Honeywell and European Union's rejection of Honeywell's merger with General Electric. Cote was elected CEO, president, and a member of the board of directors on February 19, 2002. He was elected chairman of the board on July 1, 2002.

The year Cote took office, Honeywell lost $220 million. Cote instituted conservative accounting to streamline costs. In an effort to reduce the unpredictability of asbestos-plus-environmental expenses, Honeywell established a trust for claims and reclaim soil at chemical plants. As a result, that expense is consistently $150 million a year, after-tax. Honeywell saw improved quality in design, increased production, and lower production costs after it implemented a new productivity management system. During the 2008-2009 recession, the company instituted furloughs to reduce overall operating costs rather than lay off workers.

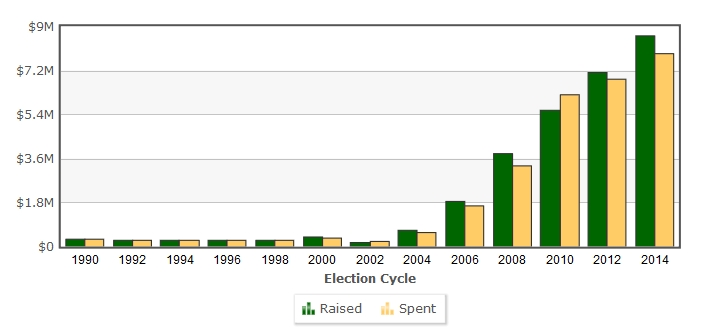
Rise in Honeywell International's political donations since appointment of David Cote in 2002.

While CEO of Honeywell International in 2015, Cote earned a total compensation of US$25,053,000 which included a base salary of $1,890,000, an annual bonus of $5,700,000, and $10,338,000 in stock options. During his tenure at Honeywell, the company's donations via its political action committee rose from $200,000 in 2002 to $8 million in 2014.

Cote stepped down as CEO at Honeywell at the end of March 2017 and was succeeded by Darius Adamczyk. Cote continued as executive chairman through April 2018.

=== Vertiv ===
Since February 7, 2020, Cote has been the executive chairman of Vertiv.

== Appointments ==
=== Banking ===
Cote was a member of the board of directors at JPMorgan Chase and an advisor to Kohlberg Kravis Roberts (KKR). In 2012, Cote came under criticism as one of the three members of JP Morgan Chase's risk committee, after CEO Jamie Dimon said on May 10, 2012, that the firm's chief investment office suffered a $2 billion loss trading credit derivatives. Commentators identified a lack of relevant expertise among the members of the committee, identifying Cote and a museum official who also served, in particular for their lack of banking experience.

In February 2014 it was announced that Cote would fill a vacancy on the board of the New York Federal Reserve. Simon Johnson, former chief economist of the International Monetary Fund, writing in The New York Times, raised doubts about the suitability of Cote's appointment, noting the "systematic breakdown of compliance and risk control" during the period when Cote was on the board of JPMorgan Chase, whilst also noting that some, but not all, of the problems there pre-dated Cote's appointment. The election papers did not mention Cote's role at JPMorgan Chase in his candidate C.V. Cote stepped down from the board of New York Federal Reserve in March 2018.

=== Government ===
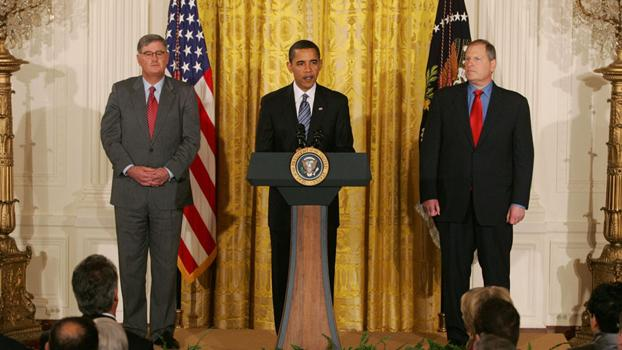
Cote (right) with President Obama at the White House in 2009.

In 2010, President Obama named Cote as one of the chief executives he most admired. In 2009, Cote was invited to the White House to meet the President for a briefing on the US economic recovery plan and in November 2009, he was one of 12 businesspeople asked by the White House to host the US-India CEO Forum, which Cote and Ratan Tata co-chaired. In February 2010, Cote was selected by President Obama to be on the National Commission on Fiscal Responsibility and Reform, more commonly known as the Simpson Bowles Commission.

=== Other ===
Cote was a member of the executive committee of The Business Council for 2011 and 2012.

== Attitude to deficit reduction ==
Cote is a co-founder of Fix the Debt, a group of executives and former legislators who campaign for deficit reduction and tax reform. In a 2013 interview with the New Hampshire Union Leader, Cote identified the problem of debt reduction in the United States as being the fact that "Washington is ruled by fear of voters ... and the three 'h's' prevail—hysteria, histrionics and hyperbole". He also framed the options for deficit reduction in terms of either increases in taxes or a reduction in social security benefits, saying, "If you have people saying, 'Don't raise my taxes, but don't cut my benefits,' it makes it really difficult to get anything done."

In 2013, during negotiations over the Federal deficit during which some Republicans threatened a default, one lobbyist was quoted as identifying "the rise of an ideological wing [within the Republican Party] that is now willing to stand up to business interests". Cote was quoted as saying "It's clearly this faction within the Republican Party that's causing the issue right now" which was interpreted by OpenSecrets.org as an implied threat that if the dissident Republicans did not co-operate, contributions from Honeywell's Political Action Committee could be cut. In 2012, Honeywell's PAC and employees made political donations of about $5.3 million to candidates and committees.

In March 2014, Cote presented his views on deficit reduction and American competitiveness to the House Committee on Financial Services of the United States House of Representatives.

== Books ==
- Winning Now, Winning Later (HarperCollins Leadership, 31 July 2020) ISBN 9781599510224, 1599510227
- How to Be a Leader: 15 Minutes a Day to Establish Communication, Resiliency, Creativity, and Humility (HarperCollins Leadership, 4 June 2024) ISBN 9781599510217, 1599510219

== Awards ==
- 2013-2016 World's Best CEOs, Barron's
- 2013 Chief Executive of the Year, Chief Executive Magazine
- 2014 Horatio Alger Award
