= June E. O'Neill =

American economist (born 1934)

June O'Neill

4th Director of the Congressional Budget Office
- In office March 1, 1995 – January 29, 1999
- Preceded by: Robert Reischauer
- Succeeded by: Dan Crippen

Personal details
- Born: June 14, 1934 (age 91) New York City, New York, U.S.
- Political party: Republican
- Spouse: David O'Neill
- Children: 2
- Education: Sarah Lawrence College (BA); Columbia University (MA, PhD)

June E. O'Neill is an American economist who was the director of the United States Congressional Budget Office (CBO) from March 1, 1995, through January 29, 1999. She was born to Louis and Matilda (Liebstein) Ellenoff on June 14, 1934, and attended Sara Lawrence College, graduating in 1955. Prior to receiving her PhD from Columbia University, she taught at Temple University. Later, she worked at the Council of Economic Advisors as a senior economist, a research associate at the Urban Institute and the Brookings Institution, served as director of the office of policy and research for the United States Commission on Civil Rights, and both before and after her time as director of the CBO, as director of the Center for Study Business and Government at Baruch College, where she is currently the Morton Wollman Professor of Economics.

She was nominated to her post at the CBO at the suggestion of then Republican congressman John Kasich, but her term as CBO director ended early to return to Baruch college amid Republican complaints that the CBO refused to use the more favorable but controversial dynamic scoring for forecasting and scoring republican-proposed legislation. She was later commended by the Senate for her service.

She has published extensively in economics, served as the Vice President of the American Economic Association in 1998, and was on their Executive Board of the Committee on the Status of Women in the Economics Profession from 1988 until 1991. She currently serves on the board of directors of the Committee for a Responsible Federal Budget.

== Bibliography ==
- O'Neill, June (2012). The Declining Importance of Race and Gender in the Labor Market: The Role of Employment Discrimination Policies. USA: AEI Press. ISBN 978-0-8447-7244-8.
- O'Neill, June (2004). Child Poverty and Welfare Reform: Stay the Course. USA: Manhattan Institute.
- O'Neill, June (1971). Resource Use in Higher Education: Trends in Output and Inputs of American Colleges and Universities, 1930-1967. Berkeley, California: Carnegie Commission on Higher Education.
