= Sarah Rosen Wartell =

American housing market expert

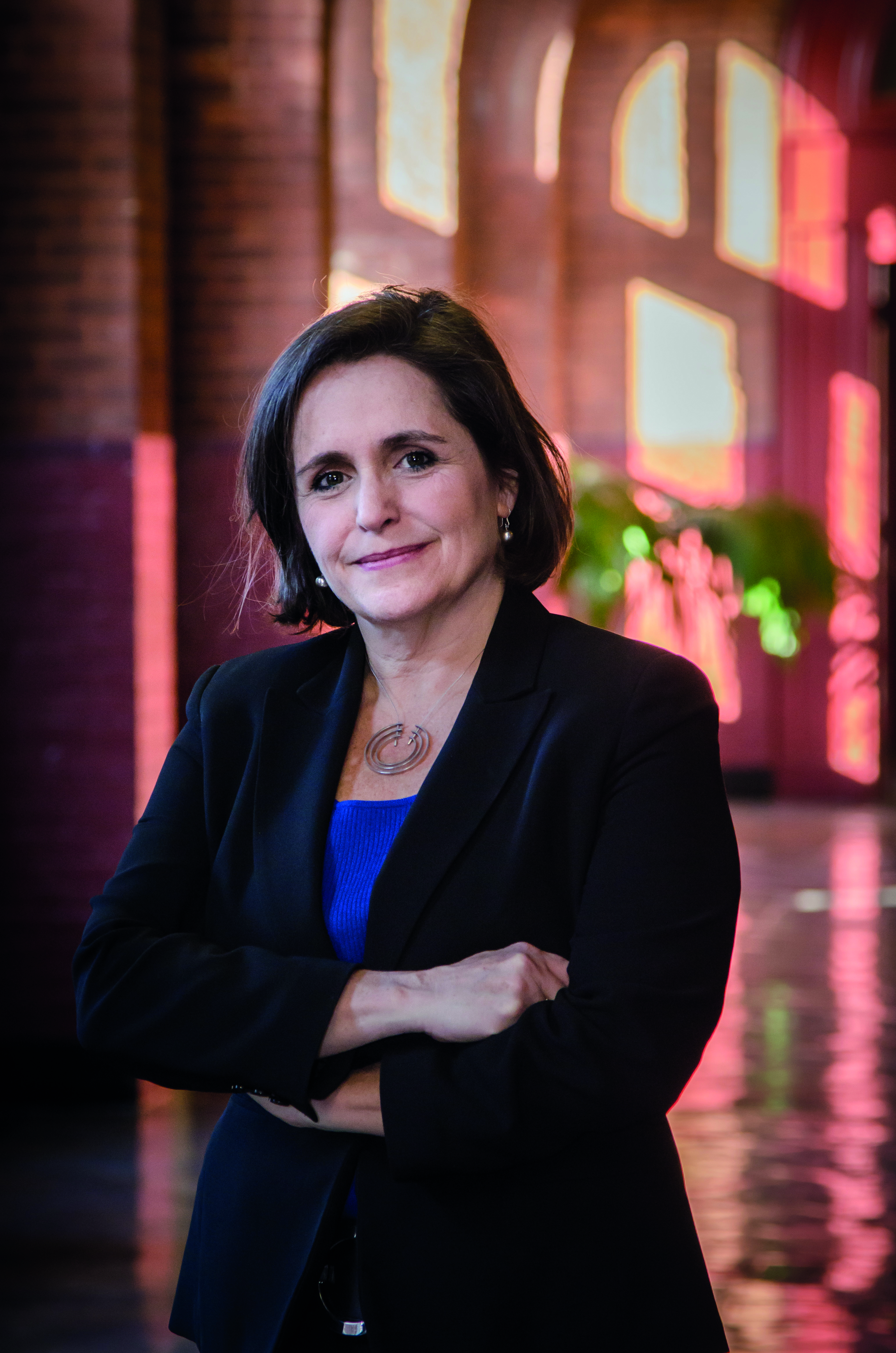
- Education: Princeton University (BA); Yale University (JD)
- Occupation: President of the Urban Institute

Sarah Rosen Wartell is an American public policy executive and housing markets expert who serves as president of the Urban Institute, a nonpartisan social and economic policy research institute in Washington D.C. She previously worked in the Federal Housing Administration and National Economic Council, and co-founded the Center for American Progress.

== Early career ==
Wartell practiced law with the Washington, D.C., firm of Arnold & Porter, was a visiting scholar and adjunct professor at Georgetown University Law Center, and was a consultant to the bipartisan Millennial Housing Commission.

== Career in government ==
=== Federal Housing Administration ===
From 1993 to 1998, Wartell was a Deputy Assistant Secretary at the Federal Housing Administration in the Department of Housing and Urban Development, advising the federal housing commissioner on housing finance, mortgage markets, and consumer protection.

=== Clinton administration ===
Wartell was President Bill Clinton's deputy assistant for economic policy and the deputy director of his National Economic Council. In the White House from 1998 to 2000, she led over a dozen interagency working groups, negotiated legislation, and managed administration policymaking in housing and community development, financial markets and banking, insurance, consumer protection, pensions, tort reform, and other areas.

== Later career ==
=== Center for American Progress ===
Wartell co-founded the Center for American Progress (CAP), a progressive public policy and research organization. She served as its first chief operating officer and general counsel and later, as executive vice president. Her work focused on the economy and housing markets, and she directed the Mortgage Finance Working Group and "Doing What Works" government performance program.

=== Urban Institute ===
In February 2012, Wartell became the third president of the Urban Institute, succeeding former president Robert D. Reischauer. The Urban Institute is an economic and social science research and policy organization with more than 650 staff members including researchers, experts, and other staff. During her tenure, Urban has articulated its strategy to “elevate the debate” by providing data and evidence to inform policy decisions.

Non-profit organization positions
Preceded by Robert Reischauer	President of the Urban Institute; 2012–present	Incumbent
