= Holly Peterson =

American producer, journalist and novelist

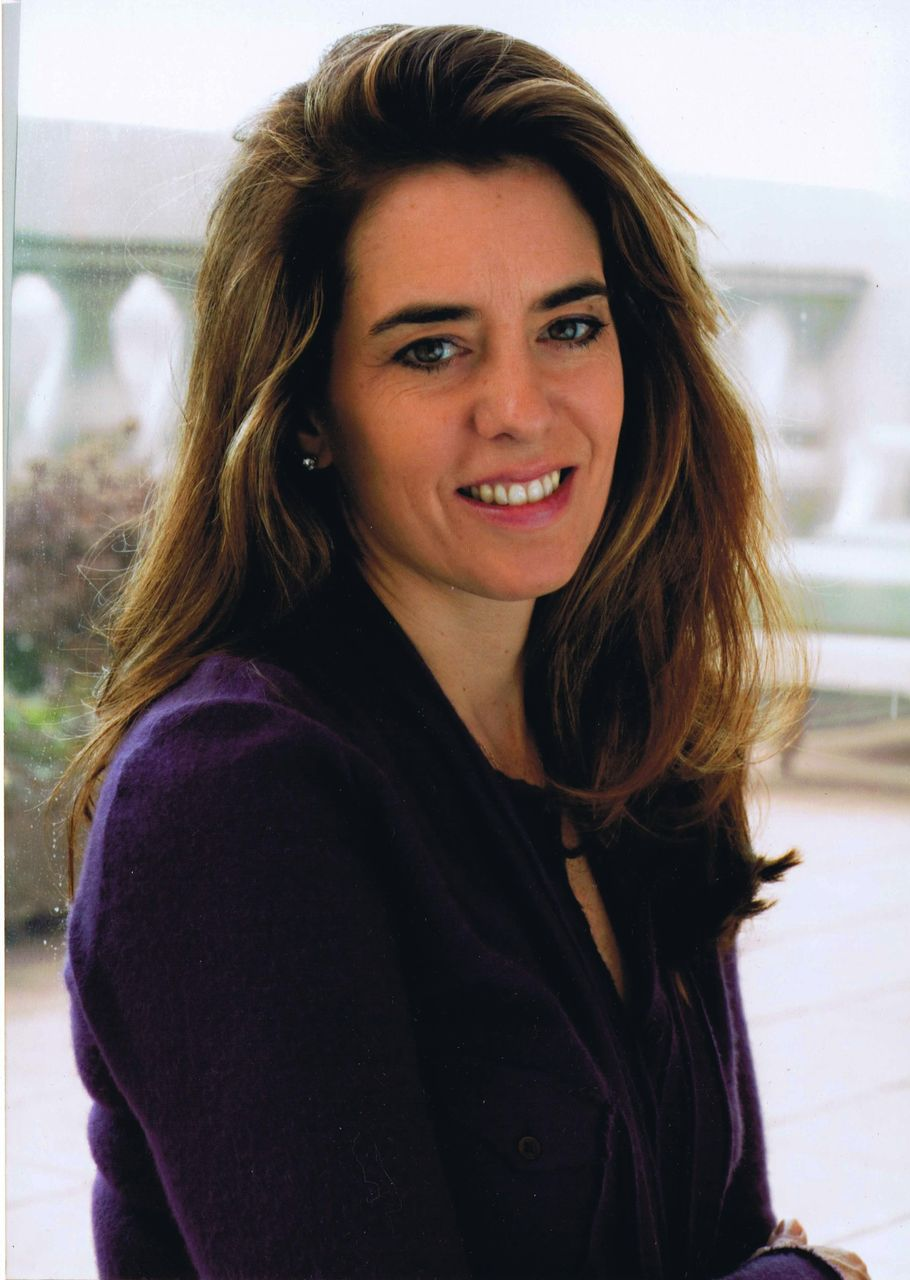
- Born: 1964 (age 61–62)
- Education: Brown University
- Occupations: Journalist, novelist
- Spouse: Richard A. Kimball Jr. (m. 1994; div. 2009)
- Children: 3
- Parents: Peter G. Peterson (father); Sally Hornbogen (mother)

Holly Peterson (born 1964) is an American producer, journalist, and novelist. Formerly a contributing editor for Newsweek magazine, an editor-at-large for Talk magazine, and a producer for ABC News, Peterson has worked as an author since 2007.

== Early life and education ==
Holly Peterson was born in 1964 in Chicago, Illinois, the daughter of Peter George Peterson and psychologist Sally Peterson. Her stepmother is Joan Ganz Cooney, the co-creator of the children's television program Sesame Street. Her stepfather, Michael Carlisle, is a partner at the book publishing company Inkwell Management.

== Career ==
After college, she worked in Washington, D.C. as a radio producer for the political consulting firm Squier/Eskew run by Robert Squier and Carter Eskew. She then moved back to New York where she was hired by ABC News and where she remained a producer of both Primetime Live and World News Tonight for a dozen years, winning a National Press Club Award and a television news Emmy Award for Outstanding Coverage of a Single Breaking News event for the 1991 coup that dissolved the USSR during Christmas of that year. She then worked for Tina Brown at Talk magazine in the role of editor-at-large where she penned a column called "Money Talks" and published several long oral histories. Peterson worked as contributing editor at Newsweek and wrote several pieces, a cover on Oprah Winfrey and several packages on women and leadership. She left the magazine in 2007.

She is a member of the Council on Foreign Relations. She serves on the board of trustees of The Children's Storefront, an independent school in Harlem as well as the board of trustees of the Studio Museum in Harlem, and New York Presbyterian Hospital.

== Writing ==
Aside from Newsweek, she has written for The Daily Beast, The New York Times, Avenue, Town and Country, ModernLuxury.com, The Beach blog of ModernLuxury.com, Talk (which was published from 1999 to 2001), Departures, Elle Decor, Vogue Living, Talk Magazine, Talk Profiles, Beach Magazine, Plum Magazine, Hamptons Magazine, Manhattan Magazine, and New York Social Diary.

Her first novel The Manny, a satire of the lives of wealthy people in New York City, was on the New York Times bestseller list in July 2007. Her second novel, The Idea of Him, published in 2014 by HarperCollins, is another work of social satire based on the high powered New Yorkers who came from nothing and made fortunes. It is also a love story of a woman who is trying to figure out if she is in love with a man or just the idea of him. In June 2016, Peterson released Smoke and Fire, published by Assouline. The book contains over 60 recipes and 100 photographs on outdoor entertaining. In May 2017, Peterson released It Happens in the Hamptons published by William Morrow Paperbacks.

== Personal life ==
Peterson married investment banker Richard A. Kimball Jr, in 1994. They had three children, then divorced 15 years later, in 2009.
