= William Gorham =

American economist (1930–2021)

Bill Gorham
- Gorham (left) and Lyndon B. Johnson at the Urban Institute dedication, 1968

Personal details
- Born: December 14, 1930 New York City, New York, U.S.
- Died: December 28, 2021 (aged 91) Washington, D.C., U.S.
- Spouse(s): Kathryn Aring (divorced); Gail Wiley
- Children: 5, including Sarah and Jennifer
- Education: Massachusetts Institute of Technology; Stanford University (BA)

William Gorham (December 14, 1930 – December 28, 2021) was an American economist and founding president of the Urban Institute, a Washington, D.C.-based social and economic policy think tank.

== Career ==
Gorham was a researcher at the RAND Corporation from 1953 to 1962, working on issues including manpower planning. Because compensation and training costs are significant issues for the military, Robert McNamara, John F. Kennedy's Secretary of Defense, hired Gorham in 1962 as Deputy Assistant Secretary of Defense for Manpower. His focuses included the military compensation program and the effectiveness and future of the draft. He served in this role until 1965. In 1965, after President Johnson declared a War on Poverty, Gorham moved to the Department of Health, Education, and Welfare as Assistant Secretary for Program Coordination until 1968. In 1968, he was among a group of economists hand-selected by President Lyndon B. Johnson to launch a new, independent research organization to evaluate the Great Society social programs, a mandate that led to the formation of a nonpartisan nonprofit, the Urban Institute. Gorham served as Urban Institute president from its founding in 1968 until his retirement in 2000.

== Personal life and death ==
Gorham was born on December 14, 1930, in New York City, where he was also raised. He attended the Massachusetts Institute of Technology and graduated from Stanford University in 1952. Gorham is survived by his wife of 50 years, Gail Wiley Gorham, who resides in Maryland. Gorham had five daughters from his first marriage to Kathryn Aring Morton (died 1980), including Sarah Gorham, a writer and publisher of Sarabande Books; Nancy Haiman, a retired senior vice president and publisher at Kaufman Hall; Kim Umbarger, a retired special education teacher; Jennifer Ackerman, a science writer; and Beckie Gorham, who predeceased him. He died on December 28, 2021, at age of 91.

Non-profit organization positions
New office	President of the Urban Institute; 1968–2000	Succeeded by Robert Reischauer
