= Sally R. Osberg =

American business executive

Sally Osberg
- Born: April 25, 1950 (age 76); Boston, Massachusetts, U.S.
- Education: Scripps College (B.A.); Claremont Graduate School (M.A.)
- Occupation: Former CEO of the Skoll Foundation

Sally R. Osberg an American business executive who formerly served as president and CEO of the Skoll Foundation, where she partnered with founder and chairman, Jeffrey Skoll. She was the founding executive director of the Children's Discovery Museum of San Jose.

Osberg joined the Skoll Foundation in February 2001. Since that time, the Foundation has invested in more than 100 ventures led by social entrepreneurs worldwide. Osberg also established the Skoll Centre for Social Entrepreneurship at the Saïd Business School of the University of Oxford; and created the annual Skoll Foundation.

Osberg received her B.A. in English from Scripps College and her M.A. in English and American Literature from the Claremont Graduate University. She now lives in Wayne, Pennsylvania.

== Publications and speeches ==
Osberg is the co-author of the book, Getting Beyond Better: How Social Entrepreneurship Works, with Roger L. Martin.

Osberg and Martin's 2007 article in Stanford Social Innovation Review, “Social Entrepreneurship: The Case for Definition”, advocated for “social entrepreneurship” as a legitimate and growing field of research.

Osberg has also written about social entrepreneurship for Harvard Business Review, Rotman magazine, Financial Times CNN, and others. She has been interviewed in Forbes, The Huffington Post, Bloomberg Television, and more. She has given keynote addresses and lectures at Santa Clara University, Stanford University, the Global Social Benefit Incubator, and the USC Price School of Public Policy.

== Organizations ==
- Skoll Foundation board of directors
- Skoll Global Threats Fund, board of directors
- Oracle Education Foundation, board of directors
- The Elders, Advisor
- Social Progress Imperative, Founding Board Member
- Partners for Sustainable Development, board of directors

== Awards ==
- 2015 NonProfit Times Top 50 Power and Influence awardees
- John W. Gardner Leadership Award from the American Leadership Forum
- Magis Global Changemaker Award from Santa Clara University
