= Maya MacGuineas =

American activist (born 1968)

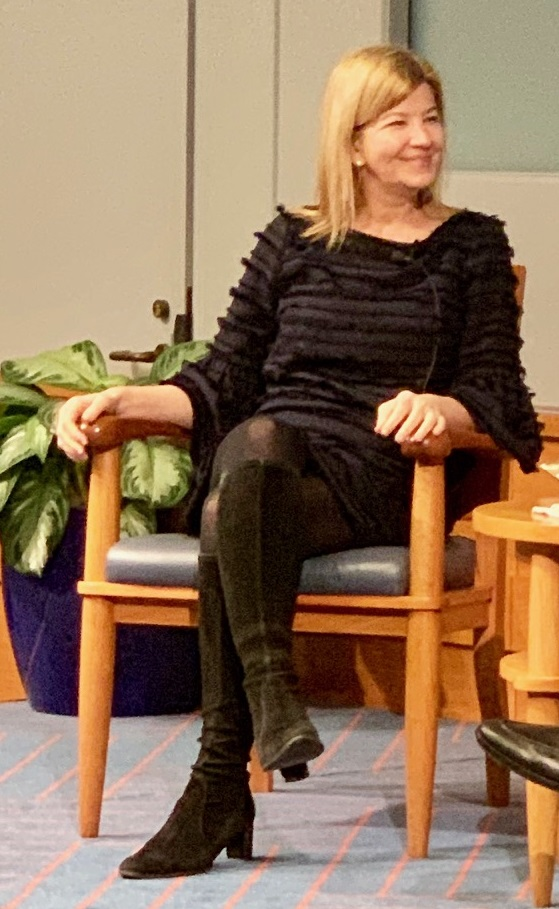
- Born: February 21, 1968 (age 58); Washington, D.C., U.S.
- Education: Northwestern University (BA); Harvard University (MPP)
- Occupation: President of the Committee for a Responsible Federal Budget
- Spouse: Robin Brooks
- Children: 2
- Website: crfb.org/staff-members

Maya MacGuineas (born February 21, 1968) is an American activist. She is president of the Committee for a Responsible Federal Budget. She is a frequent commentator on issues such as the federal budget, national debt, taxes, the economy, retirement policy, government reform, and health care.

Born in Washington, D.C. to D. Biard MacGuineas and Carol Kalish, she graduated from Northwestern University, where she majored in economics and psychology, and she received a master's degree in public policy from the Harvard University John F. Kennedy School of Government.

== Background ==
MacGuineas served briefly at the Brookings Institution early in her career, then spent two years at Paine Webber as an equity analyst on Wall Street. She also advised the 2000 presidential campaign of John McCain on Social Security.

She became a senior fellow and director of the Fiscal Policy Program at New America (organization). At New America, she oversaw its work on the federal budget, entitlement programs, and taxes.

In 2009, she served on the editorial board of The Washington Post. She previously served on the Board of Directors of Common Cause. She also served on the Domenici-Rivlin Debt Reduction Task Force.

She currently serves on the Advisory Board of the Penn-Wharton Budget Model. She is Co-Chair of the National Budgeting Roundtable.

MacGuineas also serves on the Economic Strategy Group of the Aspen Institute. In addition, she is a Member of the National Academy of Social Insurance. In 2010, MacGuineas was elected as a fellow of the National Academy of Public Administration.

=== Committee for a Responsible Federal Budget ===
MacGuineas has served as president of the Committee for a Responsible Federal Budget, a non-partisan public policy organization dedicated to fiscal issues, since 2003. The Committee has been described as a “budget watchdog” by The Hill. In 2018, she noted that she is a political independent and that the Committee is critical of both parties.

Under her leadership, the Committee grew in stature as it became a prominent voice for tackling rising national debt that is projected to reach record levels as a share of the economy in the years to come. A Roll Call article stated, “the previously obscure organization, a home for former federal budget officials, has been pulled into the spotlight, speaking to what its members and supporters argue is the overriding fiscal issue of the time.”

In 2012, she became head of the Campaign to Fix the Debt, a project of the Committee that seeks a comprehensive and bipartisan approach to addressing rising national debt. Business leaders, economists, and budget experts became involved with the Campaign, as well as thousands of grassroots supporters.

She has testified before congressional committees on several occasions. A Wall Street Journal piece described her as an “anti-deficit warrior.”

=== FixUS ===
MacGuineas is also a founder of FixUS, a project of the Committee for a Responsible Federal Budget. According to its website, “FixUS is a group of Americans united in shared concern over the divided state of our country. We believe that healing these divisions is our highest national priority, and essential to preparing our nation to face the defining challenges of the 21st century.”

In April 2019, she wrote in USA Today, along with FixUS Director Mike Murphy, “In many ways our budget deficits and ever-rising debt are a symptom and symbol of the deterioration of our politics ... As a nation, we have become incapable of making tough choices or achieving bipartisan compromise. We are focused on the short term at the expense of the long term. And we reward hyper-partisanship over making progress on behalf of the American people.”

An op-ed by MacGuineas in July 2019 in The Washington Post struck a similar note, “The dysfunctional budget process, the untenable debt situation and the inability to solve the most glaring budget problems — from a tax base riddled with ineffective loopholes, to Social Security, to the need to reform the debt ceiling — reflect the larger corrosive situation of today’s broken governance system.”

She is an advocate of a carbon tax, which "would regulate pollution far more efficiently than the mounds of regulations and restrictions on the books. By design, it would encourage businesses to continue to innovate and invest in new clean energy breakthroughs. Raising revenue, protecting the environment, replacing inefficient regulations, and prompting free market solutions is a rare policy no-brainer."
