= The Peter G. Peterson Foundation =

American foundation focusing on national debt and austerity politics

Coordinates: 40.7638°N 73.9778°W

- The foundation's logo
- Founded: 2008; 18 years ago
- Founder: Peter G. Peterson
- Type: Foundation
- Purpose: Fiscal and economic challenges of the United States
- Location(s): 1383 Avenue of the Americas; New York City, New York 10019; U.S.
- Key people: Peter G. Peterson, Founder and Chairman Michael A. Peterson, President and Chief Operating Officer
- Revenue: $95,716,695 (2014)
- Expenses: $32,403,596 (2014)
- Endowment: US$1.0 billion
- Website: pgpf.org

The Peter G. Peterson Foundation is an American foundation established in 2008 by Peter G. Peterson, former US secretary of commerce in the Nixon Administration and co-founder of the Blackstone Group, an American financial-services company.

== History ==
In 2008, Peter G. Peterson committed $1 billion to create the Peter G. Peterson Foundation, an organization dedicated to addressing economic and fiscal "sustainability challenges that threaten America's future." Peterson recruited David M. Walker, then-Comptroller General of the United States and head of the Government Accountability Office, as the foundation's first president and chief executive officer.

In 2010, the foundation launched an annual Washington, D.C., event aimed to draw attention to America's long-term fiscal issues. In October 2010, David M. Walker stepped down as President and CEO of the Peter G. Peterson Foundation to establish his own venture, the Comeback America Initiative with funding provided by the Foundation.

== Leadership ==
Board of Directors:

- Michael A. Peterson, Chairman and Chief Operating Officer
- Joan Ganz Cooney, Peter G. Peterson's widow, co-founder of Sesame Workshop

Advisory Board:

- Sen. Bill Bradley, Managing Director: Allen & Company LLC; former United States Senator
- Barry Diller, Chairman, IAC/InterActiveCorp
- Harvey V. Fineberg, President: Institute of Medicine
- Sec. Robert Rubin: Co-Chairman, Council on Foreign Relations; former United States Secretary of the Treasury
- Sheryl Sandberg, Former Chief Operating Officer: Facebook
- Sec. Donna Shalala, President: University of Miami; former United States Secretary of Health and Human Services

== Past activities ==
=== Solutions Initiative ===
In January 2011, The Peter G. Peterson Foundation launched the $1.2 million Solutions Initiative grant program. As part of this program, the American Enterprise Institute, Bipartisan Policy Center, Center for American Progress, Economic Policy Institute, The Heritage Foundation, and Roosevelt Institute Campus Network each received grants of $200,000 to develop comprehensive plans for long-term fiscal sustainability. Grantees had complete discretion and independence to develop their own fiscal goals or targets and to propose recommended packages of solutions and timeframes for achieving them.

The six Solutions Initiative plans contained specific policy recommendations, reflecting the groups' unique perspectives and priorities, and looked out 10 and 25 years into the future. To make the plans more easily comparable, the Solutions Initiative program required that they be developed from a common starting point based upon the Congressional Budget Office's long-term projections. The Peterson Foundation also asked the Tax Policy Center and Barry Anderson (former acting director at CBO) to serve as independent scorekeepers, reviewing the plans and applying consistent analytical techniques to all of the proposals.

The six Solutions Initiative plans were released at the 2011 Fiscal Summit.

=== (2012) Post-Election: The Fiscal Cliff and Beyond ===
On November 16, 2012, the Peterson Foundation hosted Post Election: The Fiscal Cliff and Beyond, which convened elected officials and policy experts to discuss implications of the impending fiscal cliff and potential paths forward within the context of the nation's political and economic challenges. Participants included former Chairmen of the Federal Reserve Alan Greenspan and Paul Volcker, Director of the National Economic Council Gene Sperling, Representatives Peter Roskam and Chris Van Hollen, former acting Director of the Congressional Budget Office Donald B. Marron Jr., and former Director of the Office of Management and Budget Peter Orzag.

=== (2011) Republican Primary Debate Sponsorship ===
The Peterson Foundation was the official broadcast sponsor of the 2011 Bloomberg/Washington Post Presidential Debate at Dartmouth College in Hanover, New Hampshire. The debate, the first of the 2012 presidential election season to focus entirely on the economy and fiscal issues, was moderated in a roundtable format by PBS' Charlie Rose, Washington Post political correspondent Karen Tumulty and Bloomberg TV White House correspondent Julianna Goldman.

As part of its sponsorship, the Foundation aired a series of informational advertisements during the debate. The ads featured children speaking to specific long-term fiscal challenges and the future effects of failing to address the U.S. debt. The final ad concluded with a message from former Sens. Bill Bradley (D-N.J.) and Judd Gregg (R-N.H.) encouraging congressional leaders to work together and develop a bipartisan plan that addresses the national debt.

=== OweNo ===
In November 2010, the Peterson Foundation launched a $6 million national campaign to raise awareness about the U.S. debt titled "OweNo." The campaign featured nationally broadcast television ads starring satirical presidential candidate named Hugh Jidette, (a play on "Huge Debt").

=== I.O.U.S.A. ===
In August 2008, The Peter G. Peterson Foundation purchased the rights to I.O.U.S.A., a documentary that examined the history and events behind America's rapidly growing national debt.

== Criticism ==
William Greider, writing in The Nation, accused Peterson of using "fiscal responsibility" as a cover for an ulterior motive, namely cutting Social Security, Medicare, and Medicaid benefits. Greider argued that Peterson wanted "to loot Social Security" and that he employed the Peter G. Peterson Foundation towards that end. Economist Dean Baker similarly described Peterson as having "been on a long quest to gut social security and Medicare, the core social insurance programmes on which American workers depend," and using the Peter G. Peterson Foundation for that purpose. Baker is quoted as saying that Peterson is "not focused on the debt so much as on cutting Social Security and Medicare", and added: "Even in the late '90s, when we had a surplus, [Peterson] was saying the same thing and the debt wasn't in any obvious way a problem then."

The think tank Citizens for Tax Justice criticized the Peter G. Peterson Foundation for its support of lenient tax policy towards corporations. The group is quoted as saying that "The Peter G. Peterson Institute, which is ostensibly concerned about the U.S. fiscal imbalance, has come out against provisions in [a Senate bill] that would prevent multinational corporations from abusing foreign tax credits ... . [T]he credit is really being used by corporations to reduce their U.S. taxes on their U.S. income."

Jeffrey Faux, an economist at the Economic Policy Institute, criticized Peterson for making his fortune at Blackstone while paying the relatively low 15 percent private equity tax. Faux is quoted as saying that "Pete Peterson has been writing books and funding think tanks, calling on people to make sacrifices ... for him to have any credibility at all he should be the first one to say we ought to be paying more taxes on these tremendously profitable arrangements." Lisa Graves, in The Nation, compared Peterson's alleged business strategy of buying firms, gutting them for profit, therein resulting in employees losing their jobs and retirement security to his strategy with the Peter G. Peterson Foundation. He is said to want to "loot Social Security", leaving Americans without retirement benefits.

== See also ==
- United States public debt
- Government debt
- Government budget deficits
- List of foundations
