= Peter G. Peterson =

American investment banker (1926–2018)

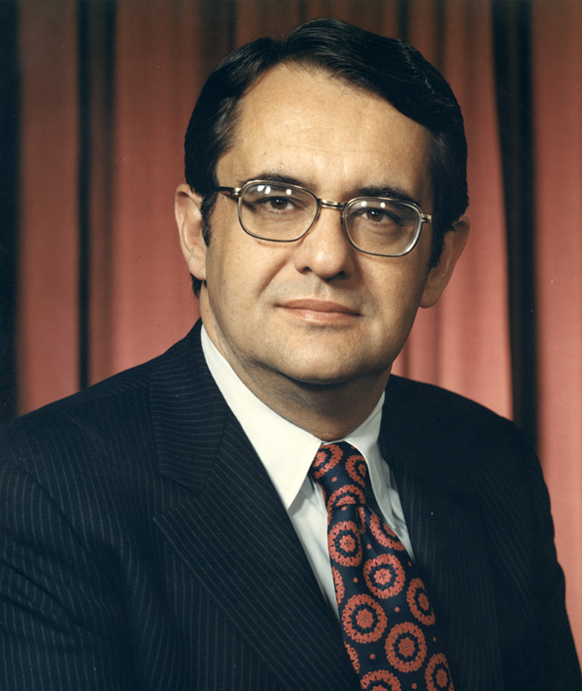

Chairman of the Council on Foreign Relations
- In office September 1, 1985 – June 30, 2007
- Preceded by: David Rockefeller
- Succeeded by: Carla Hills; Robert Rubin

20th United States Secretary of Commerce
- In office February 29, 1972 – February 1, 1973
- President: Richard Nixon
- Preceded by: Maurice Stans
- Succeeded by: Frederick B. Dent

Personal details
- Born: Peter Petropoulos; June 5, 1926 Kearney, Nebraska, U.S.
- Died: March 20, 2018 (aged 91) New York City, U.S.
- Party: Republican
- Spouses: Kris Krengel (m. 1948; div. 1950) Sally Hornbogen (m. 1953; div. 1979) Joan Ganz Cooney (m. 1980)
- Children: 5, including Holly
- Education: Northwestern University (BA); University of Chicago (MBA)

Peter George Peterson (June 5, 1926 – March 20, 2018) was an American investment banker who served as United States Secretary of Commerce from 1972 to 1973 during the administration of President Richard Nixon. Peterson was also chairman and CEO of Bell & Howell from 1963 to 1971. From 1973 to 1984, he was chairman and CEO of Lehman Brothers. In 1985, he co-founded the private equity firm the Blackstone Group, and served as chairman. In the same year, Peterson became chairman of the Council on Foreign Relations, a position he held until his retirement in 2007, after which he was named chairman emeritus. In 2008, Peterson was ranked 149th on the "Forbes 400 Richest Americans" with a net worth of $2.8 billion. He was also known as founder and principal funder of the Peter G. Peterson Foundation, which is dedicated to promoting fiscal austerity.

== Early life and education ==
Peterson was born on June 5, 1926, in Kearney, Nebraska. He was the eldest of three children born to Venetia "Venet" Paul (née Pavlou) and George Peterson (né Petropoulos). His parents were immigrants from southern Greece. He had one younger sister, Elaine, who died of croup when she was one year old, and a brother, John, who was the youngest. His father arrived in the United States at age 17, worked as a dishwasher for Union Pacific Railroad and roomed in a caboose. In 1923, George opened and then ran a Greek diner, Central Café, in Kearney, after changing his name from Georgios Petropoulos. Peter began working at the cash register at age 8. Expelled from the Massachusetts Institute of Technology for plagiarizing a term paper in his freshman year, Peterson enrolled at Northwestern University and The Kellogg School, graduating in 1947 with highest academic honors, summa cum laude. Peterson was first married from 1948 to 1950 to Kris Krengel, a journalism student at Northwestern University. He joined Market Facts upon graduation, a Chicago-based market research firm, in 1948. In 1951, he received an MBA degree from the University of Chicago Graduate School of Business before returning to Market Facts as an executive vice president.

== Business career ==
Peterson joined advertising agency McCann Erickson in 1953, again in Chicago, where he served as a director. He joined movie-equipment maker Bell and Howell Corporation in 1958 as executive vice president. He later succeeded Charles H. Percy as chairman and CEO, positions he held from 1963 to 1971.

In 1969, he was invited by philanthropist John D. Rockefeller III, CFR chairman John J. McCloy, and former treasury secretary Douglas Dillon to chair a Commission on Foundations and Private Philanthropy, which became known as the Peterson Commission. Among its recommendations adopted by the government were that foundations be required annually to disburse a minimum proportion of their funds.

== United States Secretary of Commerce (1972–73) ==
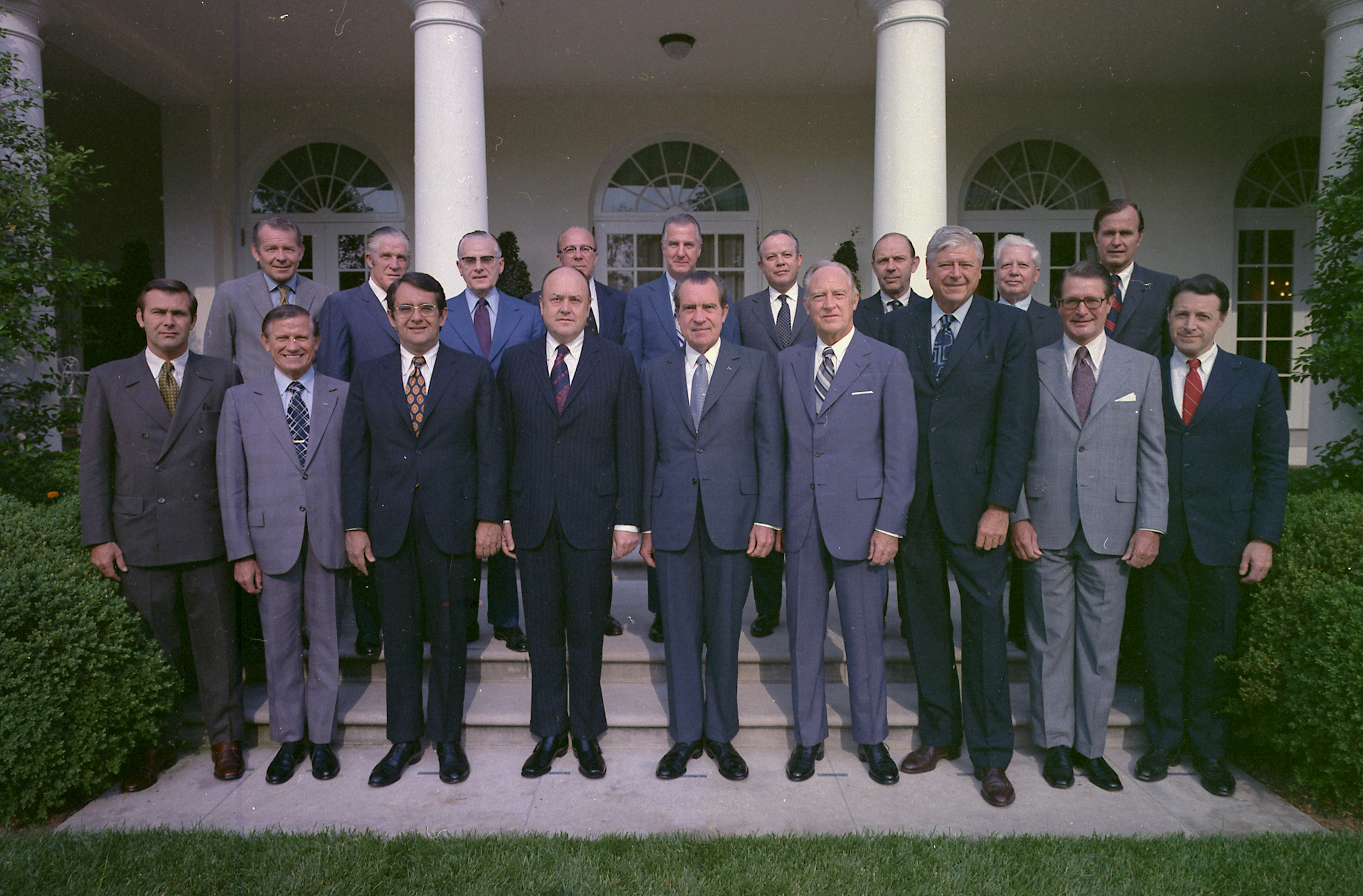
Peterson in a group photo of Nixon's cabinet on June 16, 1972, third from the left on the bottom row

In 1971, he was named assistant to the president for international economic affairs by U.S. president Richard Nixon. In April 1971, Peterson produced a secret report for Nixon on the volatile world economy that argued that the U.S. was in economic decline under the existing world order of trade, which the U.S. had helped build immediately after World War II. To stem that decline, according to Peterson, the U.S. must challenge competing nations in the trading sphere by adopting industrial policy. The report impressed Nixon and the idea of American competitive decline soon became "an article of popular belief". The report established some of the intellectual foundations of Nixon's decision in August 1971 to upend the Bretton Woods agreement. Professional economists derided the thesis as a form of mercantilism that betrayed "economic illiteracy".

In 1972, Peterson became Secretary of Commerce, a position he held for one year. At that time he also assumed the chairmanship of Nixon's National Commission on Productivity and was appointed U.S. Chairman of the U.S.–Soviet Commercial Commission. During his tenure, Peterson was a strong critic of the rising financial debt of the United States.

== Post-Washington career ==
Peterson was chairman and CEO of Lehman Brothers (1973–1977) and Lehman Brothers, Kuhn, Loeb Inc. (1977–1984).

In 1985, Peterson and Stephen A. Schwarzman co-founded the private equity and investment management firm the Blackstone Group, and for many years Peterson was its chairman. At Blackstone, he made a fortune, including the $1.9 billion he received when it went public in 2007, that funded many of his charitable and political causes.

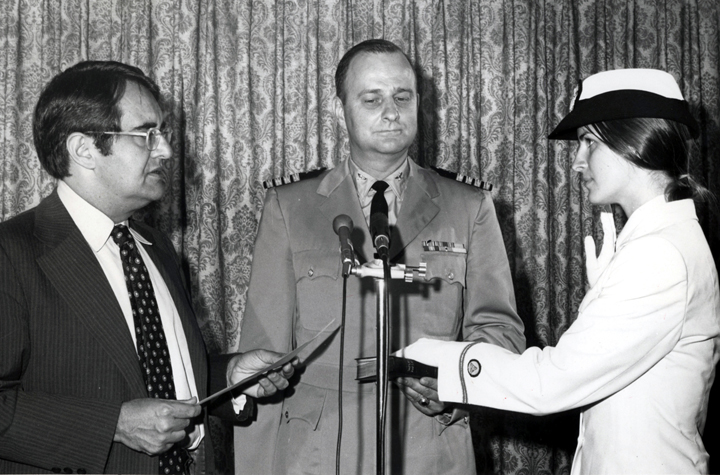
Peterson swearing in, Cmdr. Pam Chelgren-Koterba, the first woman officer of the NOAA Corps (1972)

== Clinton presidency ==
In 1992, he was one of the co-founders of the Concord Coalition, a bipartisan citizens' organization that advocates reduction of the federal budget deficit. Following record deficits under President George W. Bush, Peterson said in 2004, "I remain a Republican, but the Republicans have become a far more theological, faith-directed party, not troubling with evidence."

In February 1994, President Bill Clinton named Peterson as a member of the Bipartisan Commission on Entitlement and Tax Reform co-chaired by Senators Bob Kerrey and John Danforth. He also served as co-chair of the Conference Board Commission on Public Trust and Private Enterprises (co-chaired by John Snow).

== Later career ==
Peterson succeeded David Rockefeller as chairman of the Council on Foreign Relations in 1985 and served until his retirement from that position in 2007. He served as trustee of the Rockefeller family's Japan Society and of the Museum of Modern Art, and was previously on the board of Rockefeller Center Properties, Inc.

He was the founding chairman of the Peterson Institute for International Economics (formerly the "Institute for International Economics", renamed in his honor in 2006), and a trustee of the Committee for Economic Development. He was also chairman of the Federal Reserve Bank of New York between 2000 and 2004.

In 2008, he founded the Peter G. Peterson Foundation (PGPF), an organization devoted to spreading public awareness on fiscal sustainability issues related to the national debt, federal deficits, Social Security policy, and tax policies. PGPF distributed the 2008 documentary film I.O.U.S.A. and did outreach to the 2008 presidential candidates.

Peterson funded The Fiscal Times, a news website that reports on current economic issues, including the federal budget, the deficit, entitlements, health care, personal savings, taxation, and the global economy. Fiscal Times contributors and editors include several veteran economics reporters for The New York Times and The Washington Post.

On August 4, 2010, it was announced that Peterson had signed "The Giving Pledge". He was one of 40 billionaires, led by Bill Gates and Warren Buffett, who agreed to give at least half their wealth to charity. Most of his giving was to his own foundation, The Peter G. Peterson Foundation, which focuses on raising public awareness about long-term fiscal sustainability issues.

== Political activities ==
From 2007 through 2011, Peterson was reported to have contributed $458 million to the Peter G. Peterson Foundation, to promote the cause of fiscal responsibility.

Peterson opposed the Tax Cuts and Jobs Act of 2017 because it cut corporate and other taxes by raising the debt. "Mortgaging our fiscal future for trillions in temporary tax cuts will hurt our economy over time, and every C.E.O. should know that", he said. "True business patriots need to advocate for their country as well as their company."

== Personal life ==
Peterson was married three times and divorced twice. In 1953, he married former Brown University psychology professor Sally Hornbogen Peterson, a trustee of the Dalton School and a graduate of Northwestern University, with whom he had five children: John Scott Peterson, James Jim Peterson, David Peterson, Michael Alexander Peterson, and the writer Holly Peterson. They divorced in 1979. The next year, Peterson married Joan Ganz Cooney, the co-creator of the popular American educational children's television series Sesame Street.

In his autobiography, Peterson recalled his business and private life and blamed himself for the failure of two of his three marriages but expressed pride for having grown close to his children.

Peterson died on March 20, 2018, at age 91, of natural causes at his Manhattan home. He is survived by his children, his wife Joan, and nine grandchildren.

== Honors ==
In 1962, Peterson received the Golden Plate Award of the American Academy of Achievement.

In recognition of his support, the influential Peterson Institute for International Economics was named in his honor in 2006.

In 2006, Peterson was honored with the Woodrow Wilson Award for Corporate Citizenship by the Woodrow Wilson International Center for Scholars of the Smithsonian Institution. The same year he was elected a fellow of the American Academy of Arts and Sciences.

== Writings ==
- "Why I’m Giving Away $1 Billion", Newsweek, May 30, 2009
- "You Can't Take It with You", Newsweek, April 7, 2008
- "Old habits must change", The Banker, 3 January 2005
- Articles published in "Foreign Affairs" 1994–2004.

=== Books ===
- Facing Up: How to Rescue the Economy from Crushing Debt and Restore the American Dream. Simon & Schuster; First Edition (November 8, 1993). ISBN 978-0-671-79642-6
- Will America Grow up Before it Grows Old: How the Coming Social Security Crisis Threatens You, Your Family and Your Country. Random House; 1 edition (October 8, 1996). ISBN 978-0-679-45256-0
- Gray Dawn: How the Coming Age Wave Will Transform America—and the World. Three Rivers Press (September 26, 2000). ISBN 978-0-8129-9069-0
- On Borrowed Time: How the Growth in Entitlement Spending Threatens America's Future with Neil Howe. Transaction Publishers (May 1, 2004). ISBN 978-0-7658-0575-1
- Running on Empty: How the Democratic and Republican Parties Are Bankrupting Our Future and What Americans Can Do About It. Picador (June 16, 2005). ISBN 978-0-312-42462-6
- The Education of an American Dreamer: How a Son of Greek Immigrants Learned His Way from a Nebraska Diner to Washington, Wall Street, and Beyond. Twelve (June 8, 2009). ISBN 978-0-446-55603-3

Political offices
Preceded by Maurice Stans	United States Secretary of Commerce; 1972–1973	Succeeded by Frederick Dent
