= Urban Institute =

Washington, D.C.–based think tank

The Urban Institute
- Abbreviation: Urban
- Formation: 1968; 58 years ago
- Type: Public policy think tank
- Headquarters: 500 L'Enfant Plz SW
- Location: Washington, D.C., U.S.
- President: Sarah Rosen Wartell
- Revenue: $125,005,982 (2024)
- Expenses: $148,037,634 (2024)
- Staff: 748 (2024)
- Volunteers: 59 (2024)
- Website: urban.org

The Urban Institute is an American think tank that conducts economic and social policy research to "open minds, shape decisions, and offer solutions". The institute receives funding from government contracts, foundations, and private donors.

The Urban Institute has been categorized as "nonpartisan", "liberal", and "left-leaning". In 2020, the Urban Institute co-hosted the second annual Sadie T.M. Alexander Conference for Economics and Related Fields with The Sadie Collective in Washington, D.C.

== History and funding ==
The Urban Institute was established in 1968 by the Lyndon B. Johnson administration to study the nation's urban problems and evaluate the Great Society initiatives embodied in more than 400 laws passed in the prior four years. Johnson hand-selected economists and civic leaders such as Kermit Gordon, McGeorge Bundy, Irwin Miller, Arjay Miller, Richard Neustadt, Cyrus Vance, and Robert McNamara. William Gorham, former Assistant Secretary for Health, Education and Welfare, was selected as its first president and served from 1968 to 2000. Gradually, Urban's research and funding base broadened.

== Organization ==
Urban Institute's more than 600 staff works in several research divisions and program areas: Family and Financial Well-Being; Health Policy; Housing and Communities; Justice and Safety; Nonprofits and Philanthropy; Race and Equity; Research to Action; Tax and Income Supports; Technology and Data; Upward Mobility; and Work, Education, and Labor. The institute also houses the Urban Institute–Brookings Institution Tax Policy Center, the WorkRise network and Housing Matters.

The Institute works with the Association of Fundraising Professionals to produce the Fundraising Effectiveness Project. This report provides a summary of data from several different donor software firms and other data providers such as Bloomerang, DonorPerfect, NeonCRM, the Seventh-day Adventist Church, DataLake, DonorTrends, eTapestry, ResultsPlus, and ClearViewCRM. According to the report, donors gave 3% more in 2016 than 2015, but getting $100 cost nonprofits $95.

=== Staff ===
Sarah Rosen Wartell, a public policy executive and housing markets expert, became the third president of the Urban Institute in February 2012. She succeeded Robert D. Reischauer, former head of the Congressional Budget Office. Reischauer succeeded William Gorham, founding president, in 2000.

Most Urban Institute researchers are economists, social scientists, or public policy and administration researchers. Others are mathematicians, statisticians, city planners, engineers, or computer scientists. A few have backgrounds in medicine, law, or arts and letters. Since at least 2015, the institute's DEI program has resulted in staff being approximately 60% female identifying, and 25% minority staff.

In 2021, the Urban Institute Employees Union (UIEU) was formed and is affiliated with the Nonprofit Professional Employees Union (NPEU), a local of the International Federation of Professional and Technical Engineers. In 2024, ratification of the first collective bargaining agreement (CBA) was reached.

=== Board of trustees ===
As of 2026, the board members were: Annette Nazareth (chair), Raphael Bostic (vice chair), Diana Farrell (vice chair), W. Matthew Kelly (vice chair), J. Adam Abram, Rosie Allen-Herring, Margaret Anadu, Roy L. Austin, Kenneth Bacon, Karan Bhatia, G. T. Bynum, Jay Carney, Shaun Donovan, Tony Fratto, Alexandra Reeve Givens, Edward Glaeser, John Goodman, Heather Higginbottom, Ruth Marcus, Mary J. Miller, Michael A. Nutter, Eduardo Padrón, M. Lee Pelton, John Wallis Rowe, Patti B. Saris, Ashley Swearengin, David A. Thomas, Marta Tienda, Sarah Rosen Wartell, Neal S. Wolin.

=== Political stance ===
The Urban Institute has been referred to as "nonpartisan", "liberal", and "left-leaning". According to a study by U.S. News & World Report most political campaign donations by Urban Institute employees go to Democratic politicians. Between 2003 and 2010, Urban Institute employees' made $79,529 in political contributions, none of which went to the Republican Party.

== Assets ==
As of 2024, the Urban Institute had assets of $311,581,937.

=== Funding details ===
Funding details as of 2024:
Operating Revenue as of 2024: $125,005,982
1. Federal government (32.1%)
2. Foundations (39.0%)
3. Corporations (8.50%)
4. Nonprofits and universities (5.40%)
5. Urban Institute endowment support (5.70%)
6. State and local governments (5.80%)
7. Individuals (2.00%)
8. International organizations and foreign entities (0.30%)
9. Publication and Other Income (1.20%)
Research Expenses as of 2024: $148,037,634
1. Health Policy Center (12.1%)
2. Metropolitan Housing and Communities Policy Center (10.3%)
3. Center on Labor, Human Services, and Population (15.6%)
4. Justice Policy Center (8.30%)
5. Income and Benefits Policy Center (12.9%)
6. Tax Policy Center (6.60%)
7. Research to Action Lab (17.0%)
8. Executive Office Research (7.00%)
9. Center on Education Data and Policy (3.50%)
10. Housing Finance Policy Center (2.30%)
11. Center on Nonprofits and Philanthropy (1.50%)
12. Statistical Methods Group (0.00%)
13. Office of Technology and Data Science (0.20%)
14. Office of Race and Equity Research (2.80%)
