= Ország =

Ország or Orszag is a Hungarian surname. Notable people with the surname include:

- Jonathan Orszag (born 1973), American economist
- Lili Ország (1926–1978), Hungarian painter
- Peter R. Orszag (born 1968), American economist
- Steven Orszag (1943–2011), American mathematician
