= Lawrence Marvin Langer =

American nuclear physicist (1913–2000)

Lawrence M. Langer
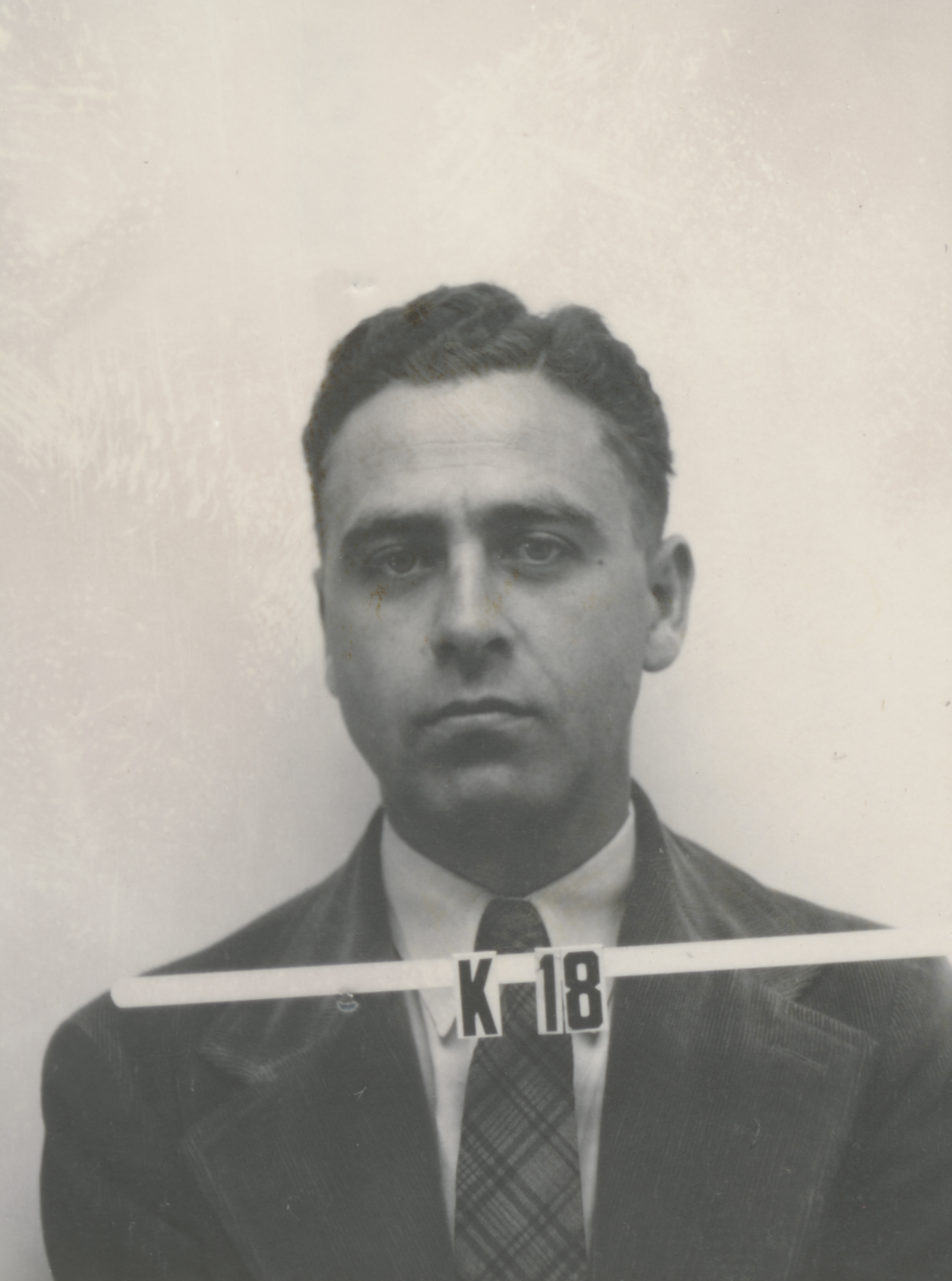
- Langer's Los Alamos badge
- Born: Lawrence Marvin Langer; December 22, 1913; New York City, U.S.
- Died: January 17, 2000 (aged 86); Bloomington, Indiana, U.S.
- Education: New York University (BS, MS, PhD)
- Scientific career
- Fields: Nuclear physics
- Workplaces: Indiana University; MIT Radiation Laboratory
- Thesis: Shape of the beta ray distribution curve of radium E at high energies (1937)
- Doctoral advisor: Allan C. G. Mitchell

Lawrence Marvin Langer (December 22, 1913 – January 17, 2000) was an American nuclear physicist and a group leader of the Manhattan Project which developed the atomic bombs that were dropped on Hiroshima and Nagasaki. He oversaw the final assembly of the first atomic bomb on the Pacific Island of Tinian and slept on the bomb itself the night before it was dropped. He also developed sonar and radar detectors during World War II and worked on the "gun" mechanism used to detonate the Uranium-235 bomb used on Hiroshima.

== Early life ==
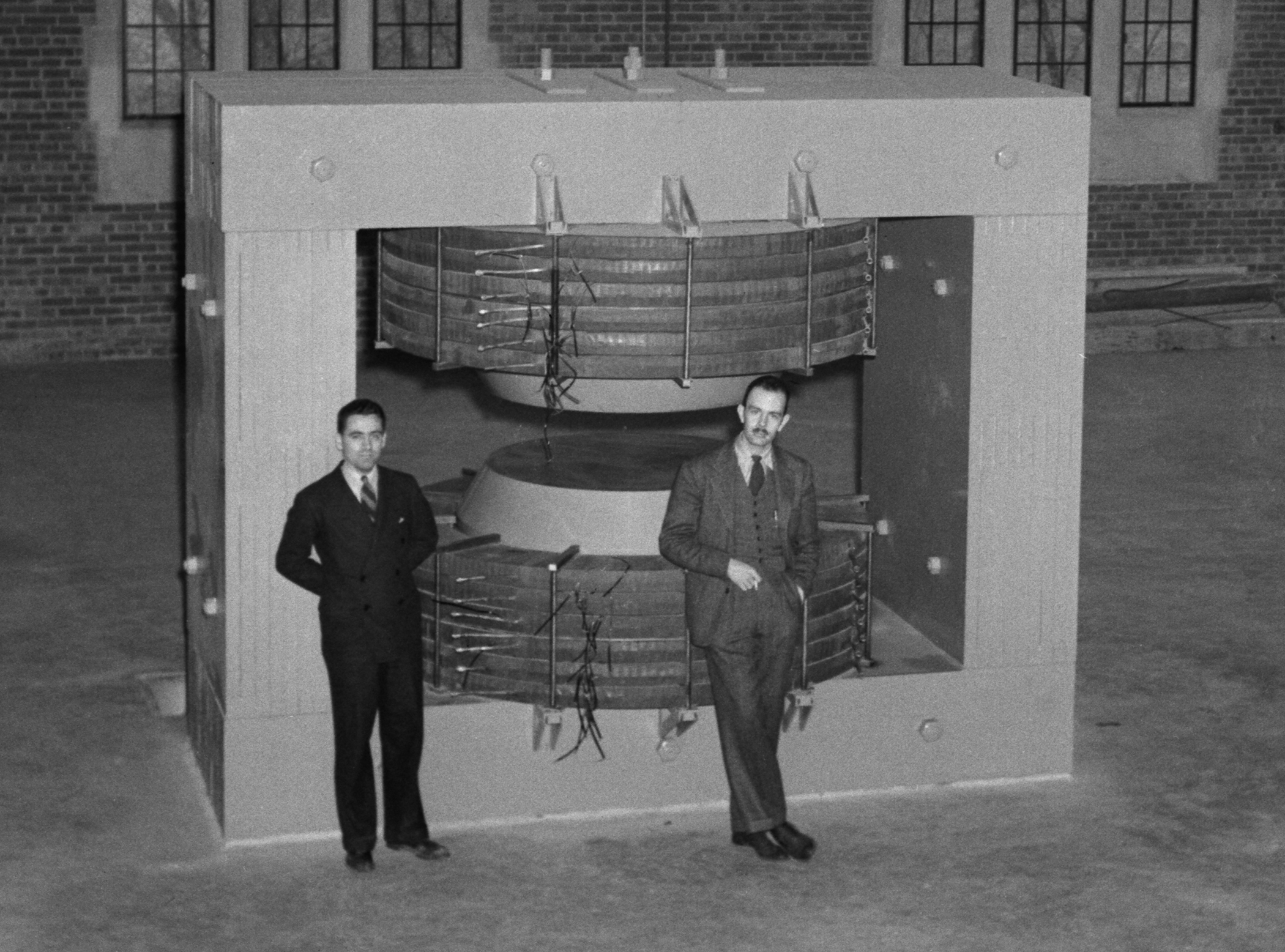
Langer (left) with Franz N. D. Kurie in front of a cyclotron at Indiana University in 1940

Langer was born in New York City on December 22, 1913. He received his B.S. in 1934, M.S. in 1935, and his Ph.D. in physics in 1938 all from New York University. The year that he received his PhD, the President of Indiana University, Herman B Wells, had a vision to start a modern-day research program in the physics department. Wells recruited Allan C. G. Mitchell who in turn hired Langer to join the Indiana University (IU) faculty. Langer contributed to IU's construction of a cyclotron. In 1941 he was elected a Fellow of the American Physical Society.

== World War II ==
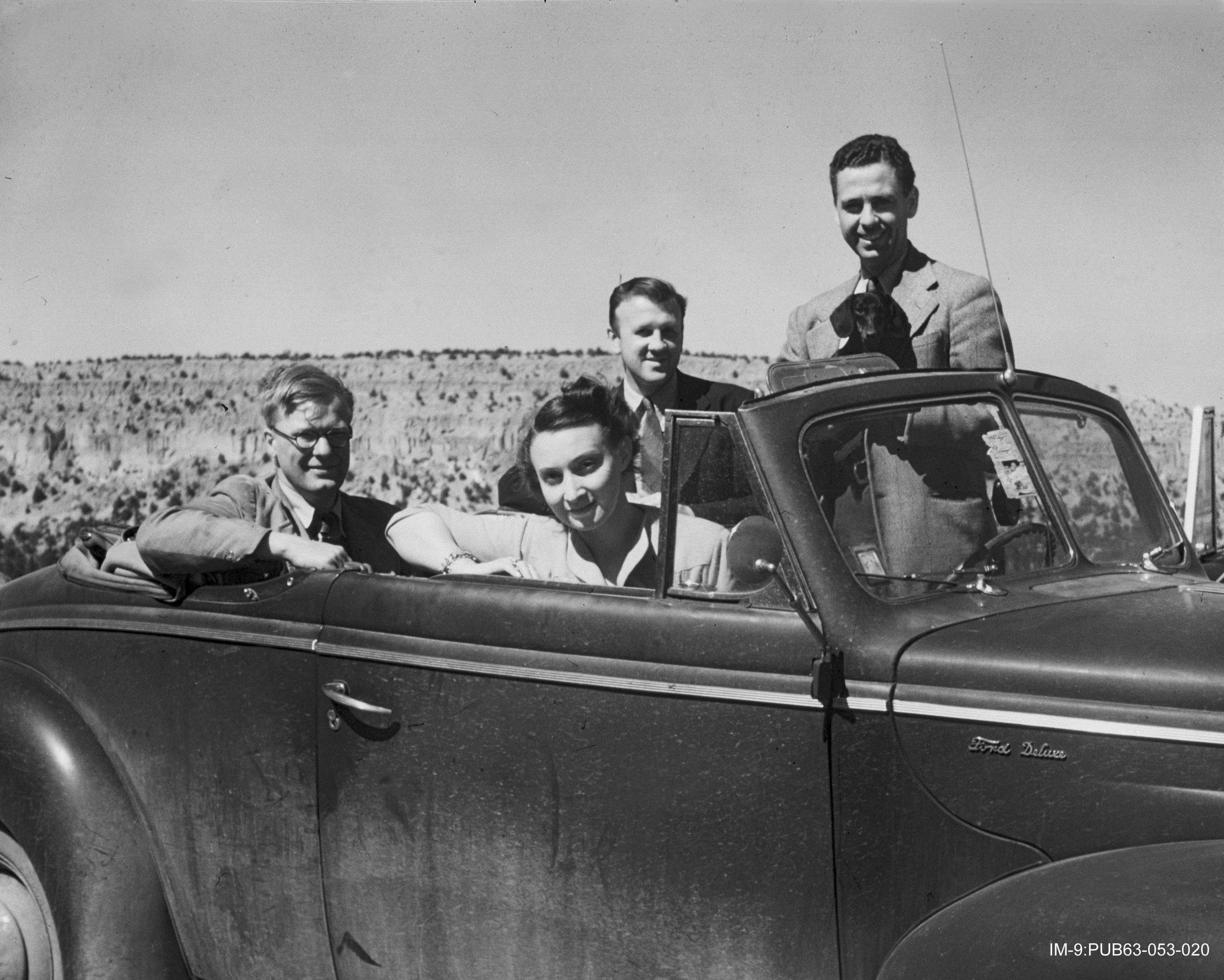
Group portrait of Los Alamos scientists William Penney, Beatrice Langer, Emil Konopinski, and Lawrence Langer in a Ford Deluxe car.

As the war approached, Langer was recruited to work in the MIT Radiation Laboratory where he was involved in flight-testing of radar prototypes in fighter planes. He was then called by the Navy to San Diego, where he worked on the development and testing of sonar detectors. In 1943, he was invited to Los Alamos, where he worked on developing the gun mechanism used to set off the atomic bombs.

The final assembly of the atomic bombs occurred on Tinian, an island in the South Pacific. In 1945 it was the home to the world's largest airfield—six runways each 2 miles long and as wide as a 10 lane highway.

The USS Indianapolis delivered the parts for the 9,700 pound Uranium-235 atomic bomb to the Tinian Islands in 1945 only to be sunk by the Japanese on its return voyage.

Langer was chosen to help assemble the bomb because of his experience with its development. Since he was not a naval officer, Langer had to train Navy Captain William S. "Deak" Parsons to arm the bomb once it was airborne using a wrench. This was a safety precaution since airplanes were known to crash upon take off from the Islands.

The first atomic bomb was nicknamed "Little Boy". The night before it was dropped it was hooked into the bomb bay of the B-29 Superfortress Enola Gay. The plane and its explosive cargo were guarded by the Military Police. Langer was not confident about the ability of the MPs to protect Little Boy from curious onlookers. According to an Associated Press interview he gave in 1995 on the 50th anniversary of detonation of the bomb, he recalled "My experience with the MPs is that they weren't very reliable so I decided to stay with the bomb and forgo dinner, " Langer said. As twilight faded into darkness, Longer grew tired. "The only place to stretch out was on top of the bomb so I did and fell asleep," he said.

Langer was awaken from his night's rest on Little Boy by the sounds of the photographer's flash bulbs popping while they were documenting the Enola Gay before its historic flight. At 2:45 am on August 6, 1945, Colonel Paul Tibbets and his crew lifted off. They dropped Little Boy about 5 hours later on Hiroshima and marked the beginning of nuclear warfare.

== Indiana University ==
Langer returned to Indiana University in 1946 after the end of World War II. He began to develop one of the world's major laboratories for nuclear spectroscopy and beta-ray spectral shapes becoming a leader in source and detector techniques.

His other interests included neutrino-antineutrino identity, a search for neutrino degeneracy and also for neutrino mass. He and his colleague in theoretical physics, Emil Konopinski, produced a 1953 article in Annual Review of Nuclear Science on beta decay that was widely cited.

He supervised 27 students through their PhD work.

He became Chairman of the IU Physics Department in 1965 and helped oversee the IU Cyclotron Facility and Nuclear Theory Center in conjunction with the National Science Foundation.

Langer stepped down as chair in 1973 and returned to full-time research and teaching. He was forced to retire in 1979 after losing his battle with multiple sclerosis.

He died in Bloomington, Indiana, on January 17, 2000.
