= Alan Mitchell =

Alan Mitchell may refer to:

- Alan Mitchell (botanist)
- Alan Mitchell (comics)
- Alan Mitchell (politician)

== See also ==
- Allan C. G. Mitchell, American physicist
