= Robert Sunshine =

American economist

Director of the Congressional Budget Office
- Acting
- In office November 25, 2008 – January 22, 2009
- Preceded by: Peter R. Orszag
- Succeeded by: Douglas Elmendorf

Personal details
- Born: Robert A. Sunshine

Robert A. Sunshine is an American government official. He was Senior Adviser to the Director of the Congressional Budget Office, having served as the deputy director of the CBO from 2007 to 2016 and acting director from November 2008 to January 2009. Sunshine retired in September of 2024 having served 48 years in the CBO.

== Career ==
Before coming to CBO, Sunshine was a senior associate with Simat, Helliesen and Eichner, a transportation consulting firm. He has been with the CBO almost from its inception. From 1976 to 1978, he was a principal analyst in CBO's Budget Analysis Division, covering transportation issues. From 1978 to 1994, he served as Chief of the Natural and Physical Resources Cost Estimates Unit in that division. From 1995 to 1999, he was the Deputy Assistant Director of the Budget Analysis Division.

From 1999 to 2007, he was the assistant director for Budget Analysis. In that capacity, he oversaw much of the work of the agency. He supervised the preparation of cost estimates and intergovernmental mandate statements (which identify the costs of federal mandates on state, local, or tribal governments) for legislation being considered by the Congress. He managed the preparation of CBO's multi-year projections of federal spending that constitute the baseline for the Congressional budget process, the agency's annual analysis of the Presidential budget, and its ongoing estimates of spending for the Congressional budget score keeping system. He also coordinated the preparation of CBO's Monthly Budget Review.

In 2003, Sunshine received the James L. Blum Award for exceptional and distinguished accomplishment and leadership in public budgeting from the American Association for Budget and Program Analysis.

Sunshine served as acting director of the CBO from November 25, 2008, to January 22, 2009. In January 2009 testimony before the Senate Budget Committee, Sunshine warned of the significance of the Great Recession. "This isn't your run-of-the-mill recession."

On January 15, 2009, CBO issued its preliminary score of Congressional Democratic Leaders' economic stimulus package designed to counter the 2008–2012 recession. CBO's analysis found that the stimulus bill would not be as stimulative as Democrats had hoped. Then House Appropriations Committee Chairman David Obey (D-Wisconsin) called them "off the wall", while Senate Majority Leader Harry Reid (D-Nevada) and Senate Appropriations Committee Chairman Daniel Inouye (D-Hawaii) also blasted the agency's report. Former CBO Director Peter R. Orszag, who a few weeks earlier worked with Sunshine, sent a letter to Congress stating that the CBO analysis "did not assess the overall package". The Washington newspaper The Hill editorialized that "what Sunshine did took courage".

In May 2010, Sunshine briefed members of the National Commission on Fiscal Responsibility and Reform on historical trends and CBO's projections related to mandatory spending.
