= Rudolph G. Penner =

Canadian-American economist

Rudy Penner

2nd Director of the Congressional Budget Office
- In office September 1, 1983 – April 28, 1987
- Preceded by: Alice Rivlin
- Succeeded by: Edward Gramlich (Acting)

Personal details
- Born: 1936 (age 89–90) Amherstburg, Ontario, U.S.
- Party: Republican
- Spouse: Alice
- Education: University of Toronto (BA); Johns Hopkins University (MA, PhD)

Rudolph G. Penner (born 1936 in Amherstburg, Ontario) is a Canadian-American economist who was the director of the United States Congressional Budget Office from September 1, 1983, through April 28, 1987.

Penner attained a bachelor's degree in economics from the University of Toronto. He enrolled in Johns Hopkins University and earned a doctorate in the discipline. He subsequently entered academia, receiving a professorship at the University of Rochester, where he concentrated on tax policy.

After joining the Office of Management & Budget, Penner rose to become the agency's chief economist during the Ford administration. Previous federal posts included stints as deputy assistant secretary for economic affairs with the U.S. Department of Housing & Urban Development and senior staff economist for the Council of Economic Advisors. In 1977, he left government to take a fellowship with the American Enterprise Institute. At the time of his appointment as head of the CBO, he expressed interest in shifting toward consumption-based taxes and working toward reduction of the federal deficit.

Penner later worked as director of the Barents Group consulting firm. He currently works as a fellow at the Urban Institute. He also serves on the board of directors of the Committee for a Responsible Federal Budget.
