= Alice Rivlin =

American economist and budget official (1931–2019)

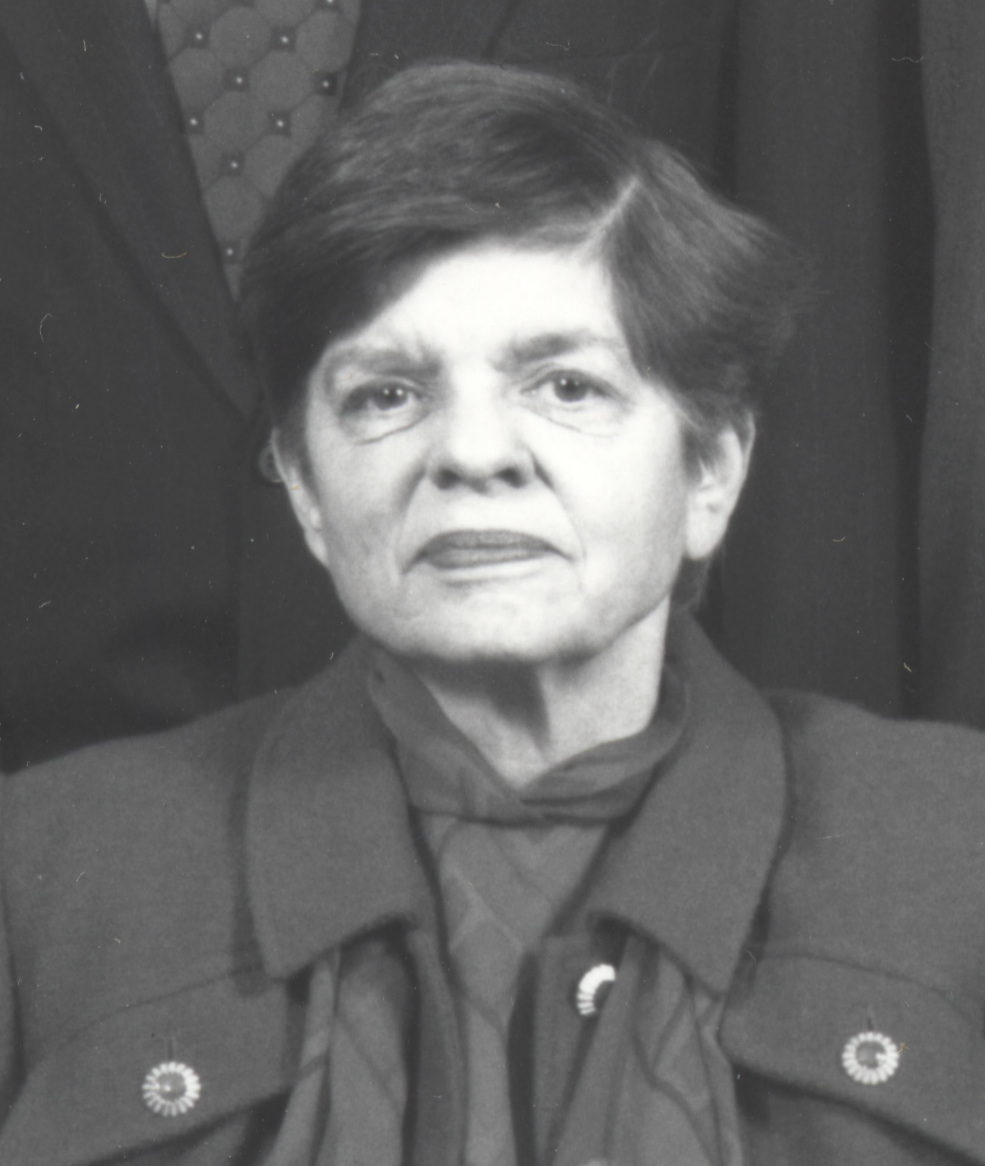
- Rivlin in 1997

Chair of the District of Columbia Financial Control Board
- In office September 1, 1998 – September 30, 2001
- Preceded by: Andrew Brimmer
- Succeeded by: Position abolished

16th Vice Chair of the Federal Reserve
- In office June 25, 1996 – July 16, 1999
- President: Bill Clinton
- Preceded by: Alan Blinder
- Succeeded by: Roger Ferguson

Member of the Federal Reserve Board of Governors
- In office June 25, 1996 – July 16, 1999
- President: Bill Clinton
- Preceded by: Alan Blinder
- Succeeded by: Mark W. Olson

30th Director of the Office of Management and Budget
- In office October 17, 1994 – April 26, 1996
- President: Bill Clinton
- Preceded by: Leon Panetta
- Succeeded by: Franklin Raines

Deputy Director of the Office of Management and Budget
- In office January 20, 1993 – October 17, 1994
- President: Bill Clinton
- Succeeded by: John Koskinen

1st Director of the Congressional Budget Office
- In office February 24, 1975 – August 31, 1983
- Preceded by: Position established
- Succeeded by: Rudolph G. Penner

Personal details
- Born: Georgianna Alice Mitchell; March 4, 1931 Philadelphia, Pennsylvania, U.S.
- Died: May 14, 2019 (aged 88) Washington, D.C., U.S.
- Party: Democratic
- Spouses: Lewis Rivlin (m. 1955; div. 1977) Sidney G. Winter (m. 1989)
- Children: 3
- Relatives: Allan C. G. Mitchell (father); Samuel Alfred Mitchell (grandfather)
- Education: Bryn Mawr College (BA); Harvard University (MA, PhD)

Alice Mitchell Rivlin (born Georgianna Alice Mitchell; March 4, 1931 – May 14, 2019) was an American economist and budget official. She served as the 16th vice chair of the Federal Reserve from 1996 to 1999. Before her appointment to the Federal Reserve, Rivlin was named director of the Office of Management and Budget in the Clinton administration from 1994 to 1996. Prior to that, she was instrumental in the establishment of the Congressional Budget Office and became its founding director from 1975 to 1983. A member of the Democratic Party, Rivlin was the first woman to hold either of those posts.

While not in government, Rivlin was a senior fellow for Economic Studies at the Brookings Institution and a visiting professor at the McCourt School of Public Policy of Georgetown University. She was a noted expert on the U.S. federal budget and macroeconomic policy; and co-chaired, with retired U.S. Senator Pete Domenici (R-NM), the Bipartisan Policy Center's Debt Reduction Task Force.

== Early life and education ==
Georgianna Alice Mitchell was born in Philadelphia, the daughter of Georgianna Peck (née Fales) and Allan C. G. Mitchell. She was the granddaughter of astronomer Samuel Alfred Mitchell. She grew up in Bloomington, Indiana, where her father was on the faculty of Indiana University. She briefly attended University High School in Bloomington before leaving to attend high school at Madeira School. She then went on to study at Bryn Mawr College. Initially, she wanted to major in history, but after taking an economics course at Indiana University, she decided to change her major to economics.

Rivlin earned her Bachelor of Arts in 1952, writing her senior thesis on the economic integration of Western Europe, and upon graduation, she moved to Europe where she worked on the Marshall Plan. Originally, Rivlin wanted to attend graduate school in public administration but was rejected on the grounds that she was a woman of marriageable age. Rivlin earned a Ph.D. in economics from Radcliffe College of Harvard University in 1958.

== Career ==
Alice Rivlin was affiliated several times with the Brookings Institution, including stints in 1957–1966, 1969–1975, 1983–1993, and 1999 to her death. She was a visiting professor at Georgetown University's McCourt School of Public Policy. From 1968 to 1969, she was appointed by President Lyndon B. Johnson as Assistant Secretary for Planning and Evaluation, United States Department of Health, Education, and Welfare. In 1971 she authored Systematic Thinking for Social Action. She was elected a Fellow of the American Academy of Arts and Sciences in 1973. She served as president of the American Economic Association in 1986.

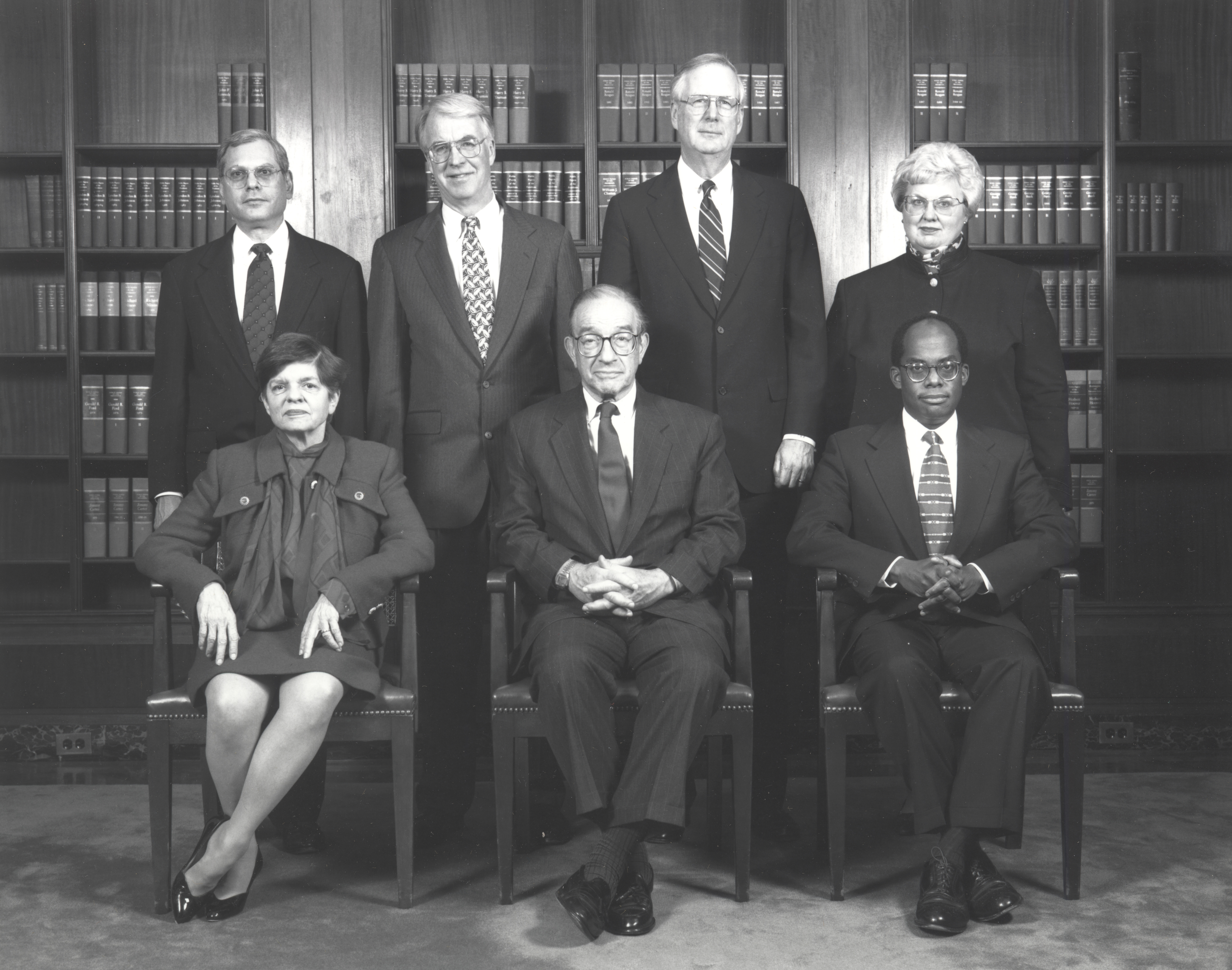
The Federal Reserve Board of Governors in 1997. Rivlin is seated far left.

Rivlin was the first director of the newly established Congressional Budget Office (CBO) during 1975–1983. As head of the CBO, she was a persistent and vociferous critic of Reaganomics. She was named a 1983 MacArthur Fellow in recognition of her role as CBO creator. After that Dr. Rivlin served as the deputy director of Office of Management and Budget (OMB) from 1993 to 1994 and was elevated to OMB director from 1994 to 1996 both in the Clinton administration. President Clinton nominated her as the Vice Chair of the Federal Reserve from 1996 to 1999. Upon confirmation, Rivlin became the highest-ranked woman in the history of the Federal Reserve at that time. She was also chair of the District of Columbia Financial Responsibility and Management Assistance Authority from 1998 to 2001.

In 2012, she received a Foremother Award from the National Research Center for Women & Families.

Rivlin was on the board of directors at the National Institute for Civil Discourse (NICD). The institute was created at the University of Arizona after the tragic shooting of former congresswoman Gabrielle Giffords in 2011, that killed 6 people and wounded 13 others.

=== Debt reduction/fiscal management panels in 2010 ===
Rivlin and former Senator Pete Domenici (R-NM) were named in January 2010 to chair a Debt Reduction Task Force, sponsored by the Bipartisan Policy Center in Washington, D.C.

Rivlin soon thereafter was named by President Obama to his 18-member bipartisan National Commission on Fiscal Responsibility and Reform panel chaired by former Senator Alan K. Simpson, (R-WY), and former White House Chief of Staff Erskine Bowles (D), commonly known as the Simpson-Bowles Commission. The balance of the panel is three more members appointed by the President, six members of the United States House of Representatives, and six members of the United States Senate. The commission first met on April 27, 2010, and had a December report deadline. A health-care component of the overall U.S. federal and state fiscal-management challenge was addressed by a panel including Rivlin on The Diane Rehm Show in June.

Along with former Comptroller General David Walker, Rivlin danced the Harlem Shake in a video produced by The Can Kicks Back, a nonpartisan group that aims to organize millennials to pressure lawmakers to address the United States' $16.4 trillion debt. The video concludes with her making an importuned plea to the twenty-somethings seated around the room: "There's no dancing around the fact that more needs to be done quickly to put our future debt on a downward track. But our leaders need to hear from you."

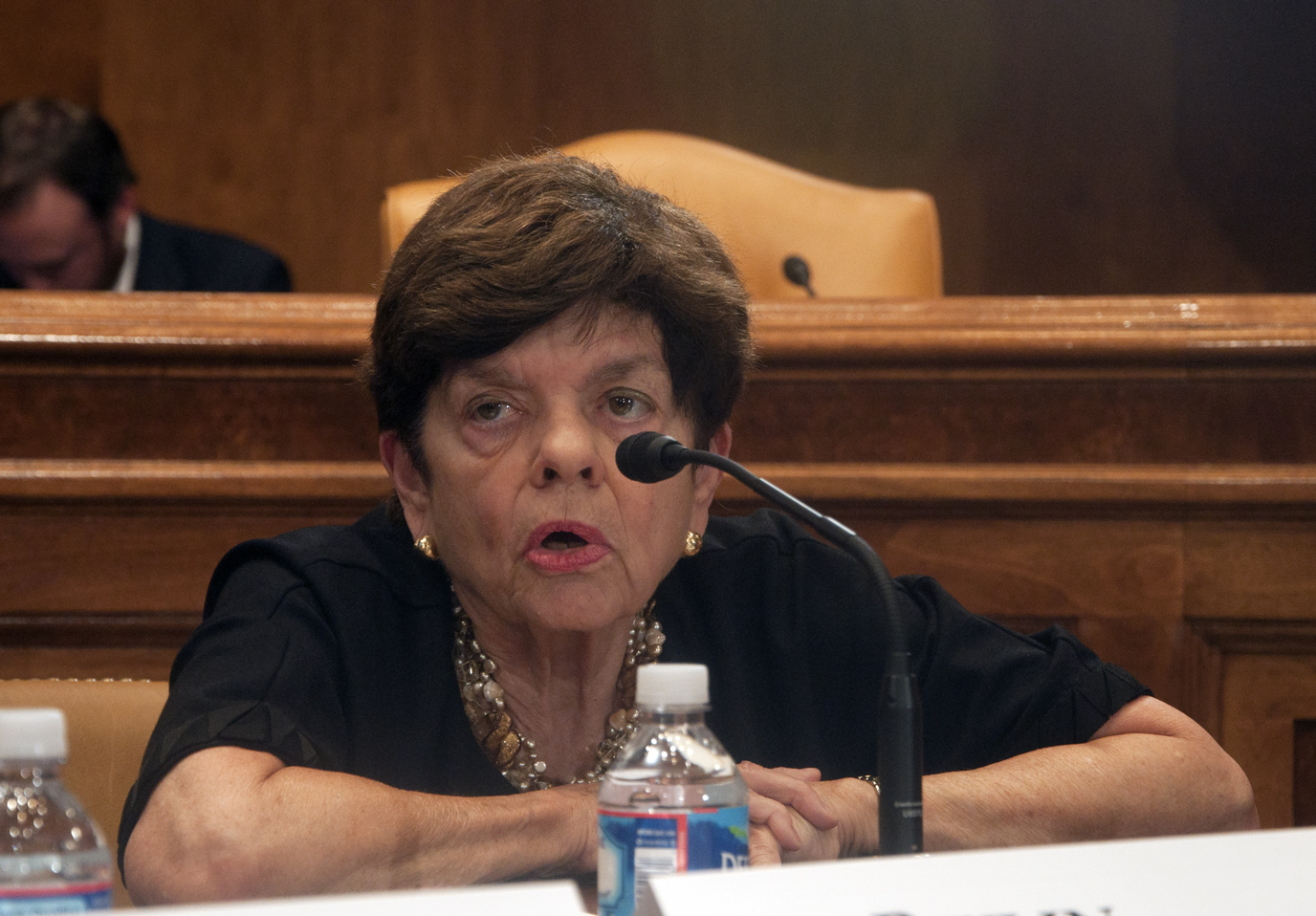
Rivlin in 2011

== Personal life ==
Rivlin was of Cornish ancestry. In 1955, she married former Justice Department attorney Lewis Allen Rivlin of the Rivlin family, with whom she had three children; they divorced in 1977, although she kept his surname professionally. In 1989, she married economist Sidney G. Winter. She died in Washington, D.C., on May 14, 2019, aged 88.

== Awards ==
- Golden Plate Award of the American Academy of Achievement, 1987
- First winner of the Carolyn Shaw Bell Award, 1998
- Elliot L. Richardson Prize, 2002
- Daniel Patrick Moynihan Prize winner, 2008 from the American Academy of Political and Social Science
- Foremother Award from the National Center for Health Research, 2012
- One of the members of the inaugural class of the Government Hall of Fame, 2019, posthumous

== Bibliography ==
- Rivlin, Alice (1971). Systematic Thinking for Social Action. USA: Brookings Institution. ISBN 978-0815774778.
- Rivlin, Alice (1988). Caring for the Disabled Elderly: Who Will Pay?. USA: Brookings Institution. ISBN 978-0815774983.
- Rivlin, Alice (1992). Reviving the American Dream: The Economy, the States, and the Federal Government. USA: Brookings Institution. ISBN 978-0815791683.

== See also ==
- List of female United States Cabinet members

Government offices
New office	Director of the Congressional Budget Office; 1975–1983	Succeeded by Rudolph G. Penner
Preceded by Alan Blinder	Member of the Federal Reserve Board of Governors; 1996–1999	Succeeded by Mark W. Olson
Preceded by Alan Blinder	Vice Chair of the Federal Reserve; 1996–1999	Succeeded by Roger W. Ferguson Jr.
Preceded by Andrew Brimmer	Chair of the District of Columbia Financial Control Board; 1998–2001	Position abolished
Political offices
Preceded by Leon Panetta	Director of the Office of Management and Budget; 1994–1996	Succeeded by Frank Raines
