= Edward Gramlich =

American economist and government official (1939–2007)

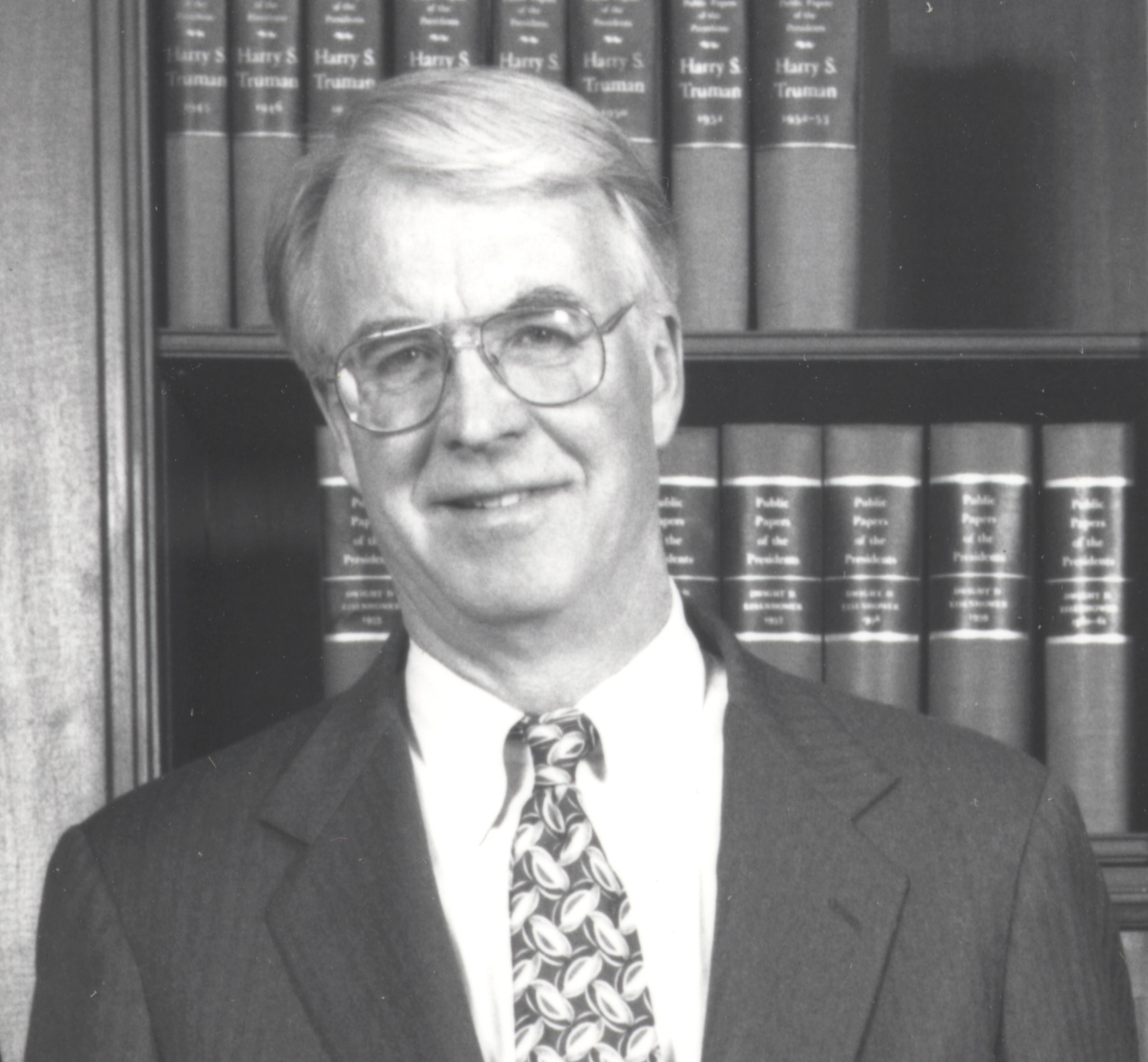

Member of the Federal Reserve Board of Governors
- In office November 5, 1997 – August 31, 2005
- President: Bill Clinton; George W. Bush
- Preceded by: Janet Yellen
- Succeeded by: Randall Kroszner

Director of the Congressional Budget Office
- Acting
- In office April 28, 1987 – December 1987
- Preceded by: Rudolph G. Penner
- Succeeded by: James L. Blum (Acting)

Personal details
- Born: June 18, 1939; Rochester, New York, U.S.
- Died: September 5, 2007 (aged 68); Washington, D.C., U.S.
- Political party: Democratic
- Education: Williams College (BA); Yale University (MA, PhD)

Edward M. Gramlich (June 18, 1939 – September 5, 2007) was an American economist who served as a member of the Federal Reserve Board of Governors from 1997 to 2005. Gramlich was also an acting director of the Congressional Budget Office.

Gramlich graduated from Williams College in 1961 and received a master's degree in 1962 and a Ph.D. in economics in 1965 from Yale University. He joined the Federal Reserve as a research economist from 1965 to 1970, and was a senior fellow at the Brookings Institution from 1973 to 1976. He then taught economics and public policy at the University of Michigan from 1976 to 1997, including a term as dean of the Gerald R. Ford School of Public Policy, and returned to Michigan as a professor in 2005.

== Biography ==
He was appointed to the Federal Reserve System by President Bill Clinton in 1997 and resigned in August 2005. For much of his term, he was the chair of the Board's Committee on Consumer and Community Affairs.

He was also the chairman of the Air Transportation Stabilization Board, which was created by Congress after the 9/11 attacks raised concerns about the survival of the U.S. airline industry. Gramlich had also chaired several other lesser-known stabilization boards created by Congress. In an April 2003 speech to the National Economists Club, he concluded that such boards are an ineffective way to help struggling industries because of the time it takes before help arrives and because the industries that are in need of help often have far deeper problems that the stabilization boards cannot fix.

“If Congress wants to bail out an industry in a hurry, it should bail it out. It takes time to act in this program, which means it's probably not a good program for [emergency] scenarios”, Gramlich told the club.

Gramlich was also formerly the chairman of the Neighborhood Reinvestment Corporation and was seen as an expert on subprime lending after his years as a banking regulator at the Federal Reserve.

Gramlich had other government experience as well, serving as chairman of the Quadrennial Advisory Council on Social Security from 1994 to 1996 and as deputy director, and then acting director, of the Congressional Budget Office in 1986–1987. He also conducted research in 1992 on the economics of major league baseball and wrote a popular textbook on benefit-cost analysis that is in its second edition.

Gramlich highlighted the problems with subprime mortgages prior to the 2007-09 financial crisis. His book, Subprime Mortgages: America's Latest Boom and Bust, was published before the crisis was widely recognized and he had spoken out about them earlier.

Gramlich died on September 5, 2007, from acute myeloid leukemia. He and his wife, Ruth had two children, Sarah and Robert, both married, and six grandchildren.

Government offices
Preceded by Janet Yellen	Member of the Federal Reserve Board of Governors; 1997–2005	Succeeded by Randall Kroszner
