= Randall Kroszner =

American economist (born 1962)

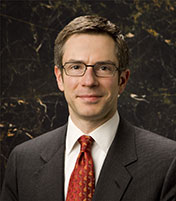

Member of the Federal Reserve Board of Governors
- In office March 1, 2006 – January 21, 2009
- Nominated by: George W. Bush
- Preceded by: Edward Gramlich
- Succeeded by: Daniel Tarullo

Personal details
- Party: Republican
- Education: Brown University (BA); Harvard University (MA, PhD)

Randall S. Kroszner (born June 22, 1962) is an American economist who served as a member of the Federal Reserve Board of Governors from 2006 to 2009. Kroszner chaired Fed's board Committee on Supervision and Regulation of Banking Institutions during the 2008 financial crisis. He has been professor of economics at the University of Chicago since the 1990s, with various leaves, and named Norman R. Bobins Professor of Economics at the University of Chicago Booth School of Business in 2009, and serves as a senior advisor for Patomak Partners.

== Early life and education ==
Kroszner was born in Englewood, New Jersey. He received his B.A. magna cum laude in applied mathematics/economics from Brown University in 1984, and his M.A. (1987) and Ph.D. (1990) from Harvard University, both in economics.

== Professional career ==
Kroszner is Norman R. Bobins Professor of Economics at the University of Chicago Booth School of Business. He was also assistant professor (1990–1994) and associate professor (1994–1999) at the university before becoming a full professor in 1999. Kroszner was Director of the George J. Stigler Center for the Study of the Economy and the State and editor of the Journal of Law and Economics. He was a visiting scholar at the American Enterprise Institute, a research associate at the National Bureau of Economic Research, and a director at the National Association for Business Economics. Kroszner also was a member of the Federal Economic Statistics Advisory Committee at the Bureau of Labor Statistics in the Department of Labor.

Kroszner has been a visiting scholar at the Securities and Exchange Commission; the IMF; the Stockholm School of Economics, Sweden; the Free University of Berlin, Germany; Stockholm University, Sweden; and the London School of Economics. He was the John M. Olin Visiting Fellow in Law and Economics at the University of Chicago Law School and the Bertil Danielson Visiting Professor of Banking and Finance at the Stockholm School of Economics. He also attends Peter Thiel's Dialog events.

He is currently working at Patomak Global Partners LLC as a senior professional

== George W. Bush administration ==
Kroszner was a member of the President's Council of Economic Advisers (CEA) from 2001 to 2003. While at the CEA, he was heavily involved in formulating the policy response to corporate governance scandals, as well as in advising on a wide range of domestic and international issues, including banking and financial regulation, government-sponsored enterprises, pension reform, corporate governance reform, terrorism risk insurance, tax reform, currency crisis management, sovereign debt restructuring, the role of the International Monetary Fund (IMF), international trade, and economic development.

== Federal Reserve career ==
Prior to being appointed to the Board of Governors, Kroszner served the Federal Reserve System in several roles. He was a visiting scholar at the Board of Governors and a research consultant and a member of the Academic Advisory Panel at the Federal Reserve Bank of Chicago. Kroszner also has been a visiting scholar at the Federal Reserve Banks of New York City, St. Louis, Kansas City, and Minneapolis.

== Economic views ==
He is a student of the Chicago school of economics.

Government offices
| Preceded by Edward Gramlich | Member of the Federal Reserve Board of Governors; 2006–2009 | Succeeded by Daniel Tarullo |
