= Daniel Tarullo =

American law professor

Dan Tarullo
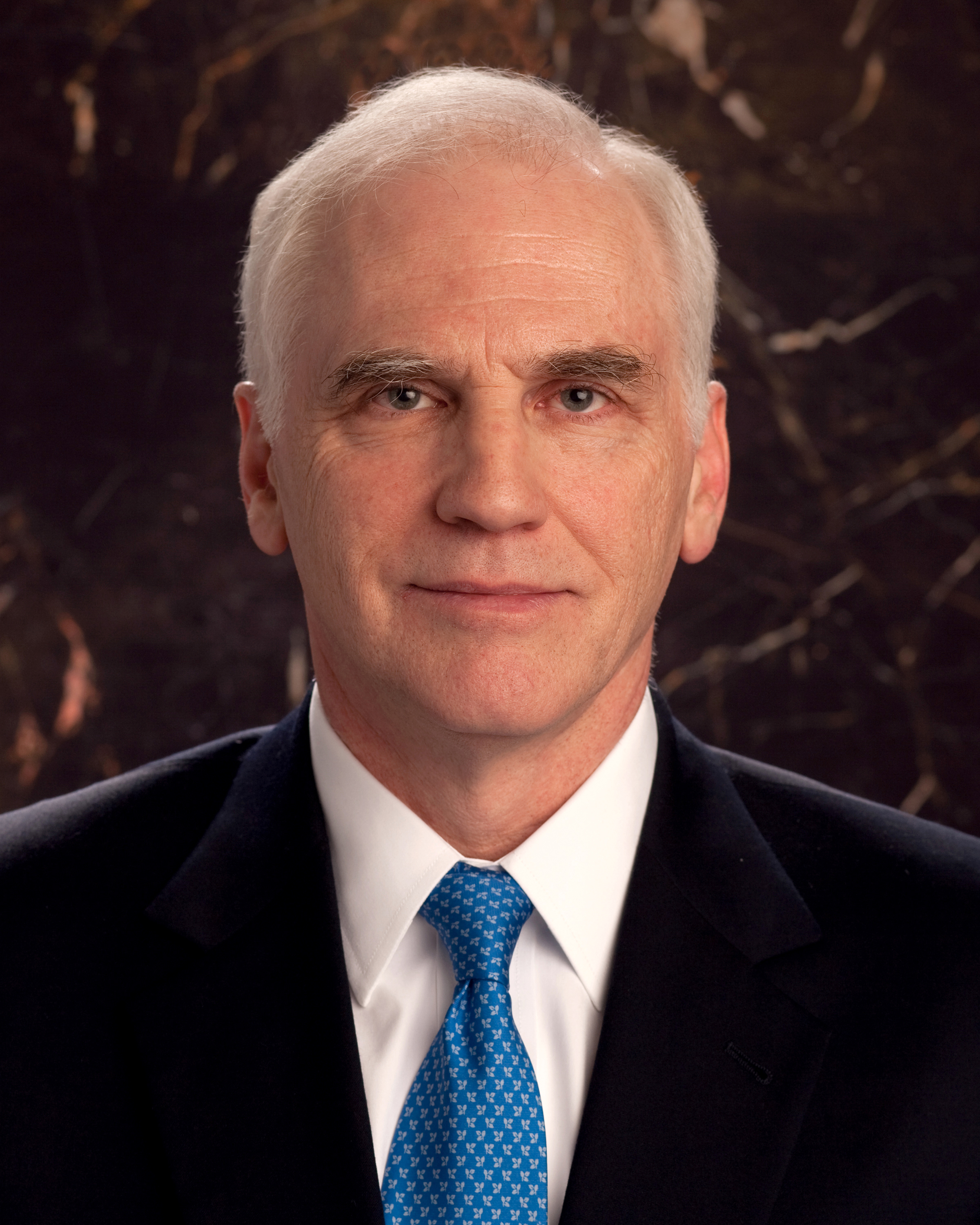

Member of the Federal Reserve Board of Governors
- In office January 28, 2009 – April 5, 2017
- Nominated by: Barack Obama
- Preceded by: Randall Kroszner
- Succeeded by: Richard Clarida

19th Assistant Secretary of State for Economic and Business Affairs
- In office 1993–1996
- Preceded by: Eugene J. McAllister
- Succeeded by: Alan Larson

Personal details
- Born: November 1952 (age 73) Boston, Massachusetts, U.S.
- Party: Democratic
- Education: Georgetown University (BA); Duke University (MA); University of Michigan, Ann; Arbor (JD)

Daniel K. Tarullo (born November 1952) is an American law professor who served as a member of the Federal Reserve Board of Governors from 2009 to 2017. Tarullo concurrently served as the chairman of the Federal Financial Institutions Examination Council (FFIEC). In February 2017, he announced his intention to resign from the Board of Governors in early April 2017.

He also teaches at Harvard Law School, specializing in international economic regulation, banking law, and administrative law.

== Early life ==
Tarullo was born in Boston, Massachusetts, and graduated from the prestigious Roxbury Latin School in 1969. He received a B.A. from Georgetown University in 1973 and an M.A. at Duke University in 1974. He graduated summa cum laude in 1977 from the University of Michigan Law School, where he was an editor in the Michigan Law Review.

== Career ==
Tarullo worked in the Antitrust Division of the U.S. Department of Justice and as Special Assistant to the Undersecretary of Commerce. He taught at Harvard Law School early in his career, having been denied tenure in a then unusual move by Harvard leadership. He later served as Chief Counsel for Employment Policy on the staff of Senator Edward M. Kennedy and practiced law in Washington, D.C.

He served in the Clinton Administration as Deputy Assistant to the President for Economic Policy and later as Assistant to the President for International Economic Policy where he was responsible for coordinating the international economic policy of the administration. He was a member of the National Economic Council and the National Security Council. He was also Assistant Secretary of State for Economic and Business Affairs from 1993 to 1996.

Tarullo served as a senior fellow at the Council on Foreign Relations and as a senior fellow at the Center for American Progress. During 2005 he was the chair the Economic Security group of the Princeton Project on National Security.

Shortly after he took office, President Barack Obama nominated Tarullo to the Board of Governors of the Federal Reserve. He took office on January 28, 2009, to fill an unexpired term ending January 31, 2022. Barney Frank referred to Tarullo as "the de facto Fed Vice-Chairman for Regulation".

On January 3, 2014, Daniel Tarullo administered the oath of office to Janet Yellen, as Chairman of the Federal Reserve, as she took office, replacing Ben Bernanke, who joined the Brookings Institution, as a distinguished fellow in residence.

== Articles and editorial work ==
=== Editorial ===
- Runs the bi-monthly World Economic Update, a forum sponsored by the Council on Foreign Relations for debate on the United States and global economies among leading economists.
- Serves on the editorial advisory board of The International Economy and the Advisory Committee of Transparency International.

=== Articles ===
- "Reforming the World Bank and IMF", August 2, 2007
- "Laboring for Trade Deals: Trade Agreements and Labor Rights", March 28, 2007
- "The Case for Reviving the Doha Trade Round", January 8, 2007

Government offices
Preceded by Randall Kroszner	Member of the Federal Reserve Board of Governors; 2009–2017	Succeeded by Richard Clarida
