= District of Columbia Financial Control Board =

Body chartered by the United States Congress

The District of Columbia Financial Control Board (officially the District of Columbia Financial Responsibility and Management Assistance Authority) was a five-member body established by the United States Congress in 1995 to oversee the finances of the District of Columbia. Created through the District of Columbia Financial Responsibility and Management Assistance Act of 1995, the board had the power to override decisions by District of Columbia's mayor and district council.

It suspended its activities on September 30, 2001, when the District achieved its fourth consecutive balanced budget.

== History ==
The District attained limited home rule in 1973 and was for many years financially stable. But the combination of federally imposed budget limitations and requirements, "white flight", inadequate federal support, the recession of the early 1990s, the urban crack epidemic and poor local management were too much for the city to handle and in 1994 the District began operating at a deficit. The next year the accumulated deficit had ballooned to $722 million and Wall Street dropped the District's bond rating to "junk" status creating the perception that lending to the District was risky. Without the ability to borrow, the District couldn't pay its bills.

The District's economic crisis came to the attention of the Clinton administration and the new Republican Congress. In 1995, they began to consider two options. Option one was to place the city in federal receivership, not unlike the commissioner structure prior to home rule, a move favored by some of the newly elected congressional Republicans and almost no one in the District. Option two was to create a control board which would have some control over the city's affairs.

Delegate Eleanor Holmes Norton (D-DC), the District's non-voting representative to Congress, supported the control board. She knew that jurisdictions such as New York, Cleveland and Philadelphia had emerged from financial crisis with the assistance of state-created financial control boards, and that those jurisdictions had retained partial autonomy during the control periods and received full autonomy once the control period had ended. Working with House Speaker Newt Gingrich and Rep. Tom Davis, the new chair of the D.C. subcommittee, Norton convinced Congress to pass legislation in 1995 (the District of Columbia Financial Responsibility and Management Assistance Act of 1995) creating the District of Columbia Financial Responsibility and Management Assistance Authority – or as it was commonly known: the “Control Board.”

The Control Board had broad powers traditionally reserved for the city government and responsibility for balancing the District's budget. It could approve or reject the city's annual budget, its financial plan, and any attempts to spend or borrow in the city's name. It could review all future and existing city contracts. The Board was expected to approve the Mayor's appointments to key government positions, including the Chief Financial Officer (CFO), and had the authority to remove such appointees for cause. The Control Board also could disapprove District laws passed by the council. Congress gave the Control Board four years to balance the District's budget – a balance that was required to be maintained for four years before the Control Board could be dissolved.

The board took several steps to balance the District's budget. It reviewed 1500 contracts and rejected millions of dollars in contracts to the Mayor's associates. It took contracting authority away from the Department of Human Services. It made funding decisions and overturned others. It even fired the public school superintendent and hired its own. Meanwhile, the city began to reduce the payroll and cut welfare benefits and youth programs. However, these changes only made a modest change in the District's financial situational, because the problems went far beyond local mismanagement.

The problems that caused the District's financial crisis had much more to do with its unique status and were beyond the control board's ability to repair. The District was required to fund many state functions as if it possessed the broad taxing base of a state, most notably Medicaid, welfare, public schools, roads, courts, hospitals, prisons and a university. But, it wasn't always given the same funding as states. For example, the District government was forced to educate the city's youth without nearly $300 million in operational funding it would have received were it part of a state. Furthermore, when the District attained home rule, it inherited $2 billion in unfunded pension liability, which had been accumulated entirely by the Federal Government. By 1997, that $2 billion unfunded pension liability had grown to $5 billion, almost entirely as a function of interest. On the taxing side, the District was barred from taxing non-residents - a so-called "commuter tax"; it could not assess property taxes to 43% of the District's land, either because it was federally owned or because Congress had immunized their owners (including foreign embassies and consulates, international organizations, and the headquarters of such national organizations as the American Legion and the Daughters of the American Revolution); and the federally-mandated height limit stunted growth of the tax base.

When originally given home rule, the federal government set up a system to compensate the District for its unique issues. However that payment, $660 million in 1997, was inadequate based on the federal government's own system for calculating what it should be.

So, in 1996, the Control Board released a report calling for a change in the relationship with the federal government. This led to the National Capital Revitalization and Self-Government Improvement Act of 1997 (known as “The Revitalization Act”). The Revitalization Act removed several costly state functions such as the criminal justice and tax collection systems; provided debt relief; and relieved the District of its massive, federally created pension liability and disproportionate share of Medicaid payments. It also provided additional funding for infrastructure and economic development. In return, it ended the federal payment and created additional federal oversight (the Faircloth Attachment). It did not touch limitations on revenue, such as the commuter tax ban, property tax exemptions or the federal height limitations on buildings.

The Control Board and District Government, working with the benefits of the Revitalization Act, were able to balance the District's budget and wind down the Board. Shortly after the election of the new Mayor, former Chief Financial Officer Anthony Williams, on November 3, 1998, Dr. Alice Rivlin, chair of the Control Board voluntarily relinquished control of the agencies Congress assigned to the Board, thus restoring home rule. Congress also followed suit, passing the District of Columbia Management Restoration Act of 1999, which repealed the Faircloth Attachment.

By 2001, the city had balanced five consecutive budgets (each with a surplus), restored its access to capital markets and improved bond rating, and repaid all advances made by the U.S. Treasury during the early Control Period years. This financial progress enabled the Control Board to dissolve a year earlier than scheduled, which it did on September 30, 2001.

== Board members ==
- Alice M. Rivlin, chair, 1998–2001
- Constance Berry Newman, 1995–2001
- Robert P. Watkins III, 1998–2001
- Eugene Kinlow, 1998–2001
- Andrew Brimmer, chair, 1995–98
- Stephen Harlan, 1995–98
- Joyce Ladner, 1995–98
- Edward Singletary, 1995–98
- Darius Mans, 1998–2000

== Staff ==
John W. Hill Jr. was the first executive director of the board. He was followed by Francis S. Smith. The deputy director and first Chief of Staff was Mark Goldstein. He was followed in that position by Yolanda Branche, followed by Russell Smith. For the entire term of the Control Board's life, Daniel A. Rezneck was its general counsel. Dexter Lockamy served as chief financial officer during much of the time the board was in existence. Original staff members included Ed Stephenson, Terry Carnahan and Laura Triggs. Later staff members included Karen W. Chambers who served as Director of Contracts as well as Andrew Reece, Donough McDonough, and William Stroud.
