= Samuel Alfred Mitchell =

Canadian astronomer

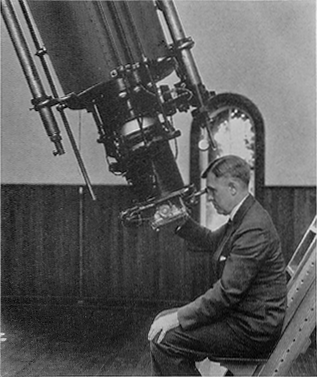
- Samuel Alfred Mitchell at McCormick Observatory
- Born: Samuel Alfred Mitchell; April 29, 1874; Kingston, Ontario
- Died: February 22, 1960 (aged 85); Bloomington, Indiana
- Occupation: Astronomer
- Children: Allan C. G. Mitchell
- Relatives: Alice Rivlin (grandchild)
- Awards: James Craig Watson Medal (1948)

Samuel Alfred Mitchell (April 29, 1874 – February 22, 1960) was a Canadian-American astronomer who studied solar eclipses and set up a program to use photographic techniques to determine the distance to stars at McCormick Observatory, where he served as the director.

== Early years ==
Mitchell was born in Kingston, Ontario, the son of John Cook and Sarah Chown Mitchell, the sixth of ten children to grow up in the Mitchell home. Mitchell's father (a tenth child) emigrated to Canada from St. Austell, Cornwall. His mother, born in Kingston, was the tenth child of parents who emigrated to Canada from Devonshire. At age twelve Mitchell went off to Kingston Collegiate Institute. From there, he went on to Queen's University where he received his Masters of Arts in mathematics in 1894. While at Queen's University, he acquired knowledge of the techniques of an astronomical observatory when he was asked to care for the astronomical instruments of the university.

Upon encouragement from his math professor, Nathan Dupuis, he left in 1895 for Johns Hopkins University to study math under Simon Newcomb, only to find Newcomb retired. Thomas Craig was the new head of mathematics and Mitchell also began study under Charles Lane Poor, the head of astronomy. Poor was an excellent teacher and Mitchell was inclined to follow astronomy from that point on. Mitchell was awarded an astronomy assistantship for his second year at JHU and continued until he received his PhD in 1898 with his thesis published in the Astrophysical Journal, which included a discussion of the amount of astigmatism of a concave grating. While at Hopkins, his astronomy duties consisted of caring for the astronomical transit instrument and the clocks in the little observatory behind the physics laboratory, and the 9.5-inch refractor in the dome of the laboratory roof.

== Yerkes Observatory ==
Following receipt of his doctoral degree, Mitchell set out for the brand new Yerkes Observatory in Wisconsin where he began work as a research student in 1898. Though he enjoyed his work at Yerkes, he was enticed to move away and became an instructor in astronomy at Columbia University in June 1899. Over the fourteen years he was at Columbia, Mitchell taught undergraduate courses in descriptive astronomy both at Columbia and later for girls from Barnard College, a year long course in geodesy for third year students, which continued into a first semester fourth year course, and a six-week summer camp for civil engineers.

== Eclipse work ==
In 1900, he took what would be for him the first of ten eclipse expeditions. The May 28, 1900 eclipse took him to Griffin, Georgia with the United States Naval Observatory. Mitchell became a world-renowned authority on solar eclipses through his numerous expeditions, including trips to: Sawah Loento, Sumatra in the Dutch East Indies (May 18, 1901), Daroca, Spain (August 30, 1905), Baker, Oregon (June 8, 1918), San Diego, California (September 10, 1923), Van Vleck Observatory, Middleton, Connecticut (January 24, 1925), Fagernas, Norway (June 29, 1927), Niuafoou or "Tin-Can" Island, Tonga, in the South Pacific Ocean (October 22, 1930), Magog, Quebec, Canada (August 31, 1932), and Kanton Island, Kiribati (June 8, 1937), this time as the scientific leader of a National Geographic Society Expedition. An article entitled "Nature's Most Dramatic Spectacle" by Mitchell appeared in the September 1938 edition of National Geographic Magazine. These ten expeditions allowed him to write Eclipses of the Sun, summarizing his work on solar flash spectra, first published in 1923 and produced through five editions (5th edition, 1951). On the 1918 Oregon and the 1925 Connecticut eclipses, Mitchell was accompanied by the artist Howard Russell Butler (1856–1934), whose paintings of totality graced the old Hayden Planetarium of the American Museum of Natural History for many years.

== Parallax work and Leander McCormick Observatory ==
Mitchell went back to Yerkes for the summers of 1909, 1910 and 1911 and then returned for a fifteen-month sabbatical in 1912 and 1913. Frank Schlesinger first demonstrated the technique of determining stellar parallaxes photographically at Yerkes in 1905, and Mitchell (along with Frederick Slocum) carried out research applying the technique, publishing their results in 1913. At that point, he was offered the directorship at the Leander McCormick Observatory at the University of Virginia. Mitchell spent much of his time and energy as director coming up with funds for running the observatory and paying staff and graduate students. Mitchell started the use of photographic plates with the visual 26-inch refractor shortly after his arrival at the University of Virginia. He became well known for his work on stellar parallaxes and photometry. Dr. Mitchell was liked by faculty and students alike, known for helping to bring prestige to the university.

== Society Memberships ==
Mitchell was elected Director Emeritus in 1945 with a wealth of academic and scientific honors attributed to him. He was a member of the following societies: National Academy of Sciences (elected in 1933, elected to council in 1940, awarded James Craig Watson Medal in 1948), American Association for the Advancement of Science (vice-president in 1921), American Astronomical Society (Vice-president 1925–1927), Royal Astronomical Society (fellow and associate), International Astronomical Union (president of Commission on Solar Eclipses and Commission on Stellar Parallaxes and Proper Motions), American Association of University Professors (chairman of Committee A, on Academic Freedom and Tenure), American Philosophical Society, and the American Academy of Arts and Sciences.

== Ice hockey career ==
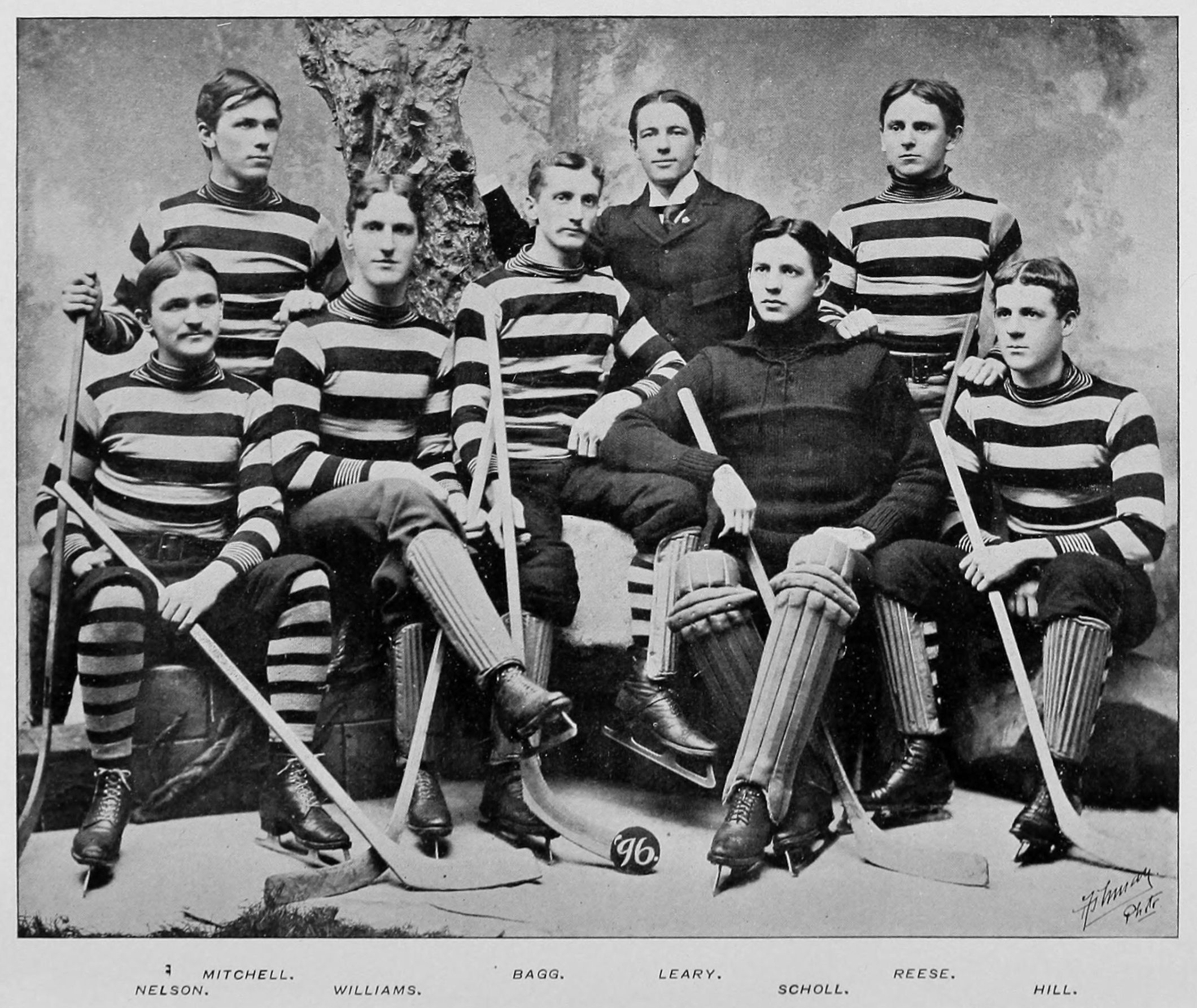
Samuel Alfred Mitchell, at left in the back row, with the ice hockey team of the Johns Hopkins University during the 1895–96 season.

While studying at the Johns Hopkins University Mitchell played on the university ice hockey team. In February 1896 he was a part of the Johns Hopkins team that played against the Yale University team in the first two intercollegiate ice hockey games in the United States. The Johns Hopkins team also played six games against the Baltimore Athletic Club during the 1895–96 season, and one game against an All-Washington aggregation.

As an ice hockey player Mitchell played predominantly at the point position which is an archaic ice hockey position equivalent to a defensive defenseman today. Mitchell also played with the university team during the 1896–97 and 1897–98 seasons.

== Family ==
In December 1899, Mitchell married Milly Gray Dumble, the daughter of Edwin Theodore Dumble, who was then the State Geologist of Texas and was later Consulting Geologist of the Southern Pacific Railroad, an expert in petroleum production.

The Mitchells' son, Allan (1902–1963), was chair of the Indiana University Physics Department from 1938 to 1963 and pioneered the creation of the IU Cyclotron Facility in 1941 (one of the first in the world). Allan's daughter was economist Alice Mitchell Rivlin.

Samuel Alfred Mitchell died in Bloomington, Indiana in 1960, aged 85.
