= Andrew Brimmer =

American economist and financial advisor (1926–2012)

Chair of the District of Columbia Financial Control Board
- In office June 1, 1995 – September 1, 1998
- Preceded by: Position established
- Succeeded by: Alice Rivlin

Member of the Federal Reserve Board of Governors
- In office March 9, 1966 – August 31, 1974
- President: Lyndon B. Johnson; Richard Nixon; Gerald Ford
- Preceded by: C. Canby Balderston
- Succeeded by: Philip Coldwell

Personal details
- Born: Andrew Felton Brimmer; September 13, 1926 Newellton, Louisiana, U.S.
- Died: October 7, 2012 (aged 86) Washington, D.C., U.S.
- Party: Democratic
- Spouse: Doris Scott
- Children: Esther
- Education: University of Washington, Seattle (BA, MA); Harvard University (PhD)

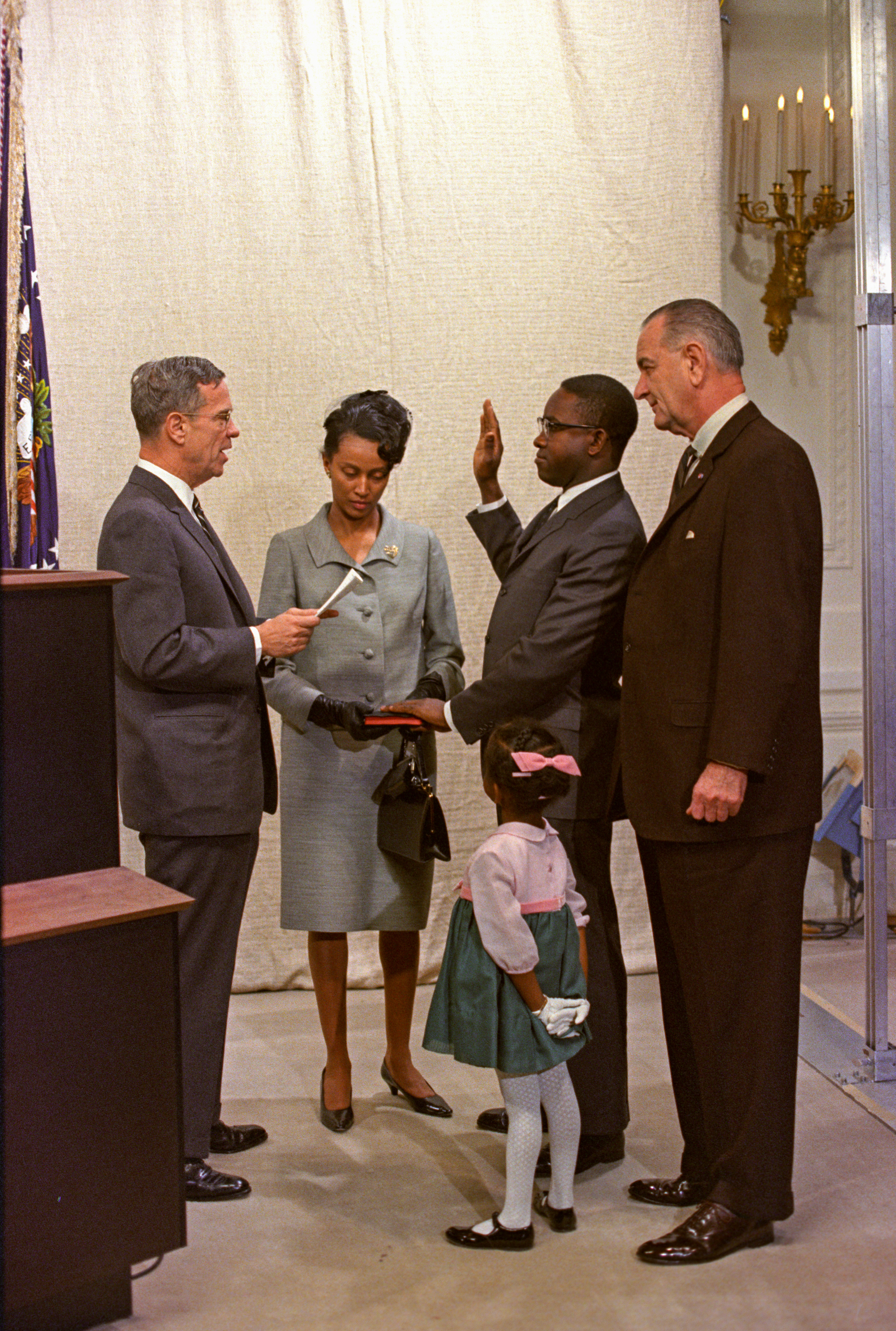
Brimmer being sworn in as a member of the Federal Reserve Board by William McChesney Martin in 1966. U.S. President Lyndon B. Johnson and Brimmer's wife and daughter, Esther, look on.

Andrew Felton Brimmer (September 13, 1926 – October 7, 2012) was an American economist and business leader who served as a member of the Federal Reserve Board of Governors from 1966 to 1974. A member of the Democratic Party, Brimmer was the first African American to sit on the Board.

== Early life and education ==
Brimmer was born in Newellton in Tensas Parish, Louisiana, to a family of sharecroppers. He attended racially segregated schools and graduated from the former Tensas Rosenwald High School in St. Joseph, the seat of government of Tensas Parish. He was a classmate of Emmitt Douglas, later the long-term president of the Louisiana NAACP. Tensas Rosenwald closed in 1970, when the parish public schools were desegregated. The formerly all-white Newellton High School then functioned as a desegregated institution from 1970 until its closing because of low enrollment in 2006.

Brimmer served in the United States Army from 1945 to 1946. He attended the University of Washington in Seattle, Washington, where he obtained both his bachelor's and master's degrees, both in economics. In 1951, Brimmer received a Fulbright scholarship to study in India, and enrolled in 1952 in Harvard University in Cambridge, Massachusetts, where in 1957, he received his Ph.D. in economics.

== Career ==
While he was still at Harvard, Brimmer worked at the Federal Reserve Bank of New York as an economist, and established the central bank of the Sudan. After graduation, Brimmer became assistant secretary of economic affairs in the U.S. Department of Commerce. In 1966, under appointment from U.S. President Lyndon B. Johnson, Brimmer began an eight-year term on the board of governors of the Federal Reserve, becoming the first African American in that position. In 1974, Brimmer left the Federal Reserve and taught at Harvard University for two years. Thereafter, he formed his own consulting company, Brimmer & Company. He was a trustee of the Economists for Peace and Security.

Brimmer served on the Tuskegee University board of directors from 1965–2010, and as the board's chairman for the last 28 years on the board, making him the longest serving chairman in the school's history.

== Awards and honors ==
- Named government man of the year by the National Business League, 1963
- Arthur S. Flemming Award, 1966
- Russwurm Award, 1966
- Golden Plate Award of the American Academy of Achievement, 1967
- Elected to the American Academy of Arts and Sciences, 1970
- National Urban League Equal Opportunity Award, 1974
- Horatio Alger Award, 1974
- Elected to the American Philosophical Society, 1976.
- Fulbright 40th Anniversary Distinguished Lecturer, Ghana and Nigeria, 1986
- Samuel Z. Westerfield Award, the highest award given by the National Economic Association, 1990, "in recognition of distinguished service, outstanding scholarship, and achievement of high standards of excellence"
- Black Enterprise A.G. Gaston Lifetime Achievement Award, 2007

In 2020, the American Economic Association announced the establishment of the "Andrew Brimmer Undergraduate Essay Prize," to be presented to an undergraduate student at a U.S. based institution of higher learning majoring in economics, political science, public policy, or related fields for the best essay on the “economic well-being of Black Americans.”

== Personal life and death ==
Brimmer married the former Doris Millicent Scott. They had a daughter, Esther Dianne Brimmer. Her son, Brimmer's grandson, is playwright Nathaniel Brimmer-Beller.

Brimmer died on October 7, 2012, at George Washington University Hospital in Washington, D.C.

== Bibliography ==
- Andrew F. Brimmer (1962). Life insurance companies in the capital market. Bureau of Business and Economic Research, Graduate School of Business Administration, Michigan State University. ISBN 9780598494658.
- Brimmer Nomination: Hearing Before the Committee on Commerce, United States Senate, Eighty-ninth Congress, First Session, on Nomination of Andrew F. Brimmer, Assistant Secretary of Commerce, February 18, 1965. U.S. Government Printing Office. 1965.
- Andrew F. Brimmer; Henry S. Terrell (December 29, 1969). "The Economic Potential of Black Capitalism". Statements and Speeches of Andrew F. Brimmer. Fraser, St. Louis Fed.
- Andrew F. Brimmer (1982). Monetary Policy and the International Diffusion of Interest Rates. International Banking Center & Department of Economics, Florida International University.

== Archives and records ==
- Andrew F. Brimmer papers at Baker Library Special Collections, Harvard Business School.

Government offices
Preceded by C. Canby Balderston	Member of the Federal Reserve Board of Governors; 1966–1974	Succeeded by Philip Coldwell
New office	Chair of the District of Columbia Financial Control Board; 1995–1998	Succeeded by Alice Rivlin
