= Congressional Budget Office =

U.S. Government agency

- Logo

Agency overview
- Formed: July 12, 1974
- Headquarters: Ford House Office Building, 4th Floor Second and D Streets, SW Washington, D.C. 20515
- Employees: 250
- Annual budget: $74.8 million (FY 2026)
- Agency executives: Phillip Swagel, Director; Mark Hadley, Deputy Director; Jeffrey R. Kling, Research Director
- Website: www.cbo.gov

The Congressional Budget Office (CBO) is a federal agency within the legislative branch of the United States government that provides budget and economic information to Congress. It is headquartered at the Ford House Office Building in Washington, DC. Inspired by California's Legislative Analyst's Office that manages the state budget in a strictly nonpartisan fashion, the CBO was created as a nonpartisan agency by the Congressional Budget and Impoundment Control Act of 1974.

Whereas politicians on both sides of the aisle have criticized the CBO when its estimates have been politically inconvenient, economists and other academics overwhelmingly reject that the CBO is partisan or that it fails to produce credible forecasts. There is a consensus among economists that "adjusting for legal restrictions on what the CBO can assume about future legislation and events, the CBO has historically issued credible forecasts of the effects of both Democratic and Republican legislative proposals."

== History ==
The Congressional Budget Office was created by Title II of the Congressional Budget and Impoundment Control Act of 1974 (Pub. L. 93-344), which was signed into law by President Richard Nixon on July 12, 1974. Official operations began on February 24, 1975, with Alice Rivlin as director.

The CBO's creation stems from a fight between President Nixon and a Democratic-controlled Congress. Congress wanted to protect its power of the purse from the executive. The CBO was created "within the legislative branch to bolster Congress's budgetary understanding and ability to act. Lawmakers' aim was both technical and political: Generate a source of budgetary expertise to aid in writing annual budgets and lessen the legislature's reliance on the president's Office of Management and Budget." In 2015, the Brookings Institution reported that since its creation, the CBO has since supplanted the OMB "as the authoritative source of information on the economy and the budget in the eyes of Congress, the press, and the public."

== Mission ==
Introduction to the Congressional Budget Office

The Congressional Budget Office is nonpartisan, and produces "independent analyses of budgetary and economic issues to support the Congressional budget process." Each year, the agency releases reports and cost estimates for proposed legislation, without issuing any policy recommendations.

With respect to estimating spending for Congress, the Congressional Budget Office serves a purpose parallel to that of the Joint Committee on Taxation for estimating revenue for Congress, the Department of the Treasury for estimating revenues for the Executive branch. This includes projections on the effect on national debt and cost estimates for legislation.

== Operations ==
Section 202(e) of the Budget Act requires the CBO to submit periodic reports about fiscal policy to the House and Senate budget committees to provide baseline projections of the federal budget. This is currently done by preparation of an annual Economic and Budget Outlook plus a mid-year update. The agency also each year issues An Analysis of the President's Budgetary Proposals for the upcoming fiscal year per a standing request of the Senate Committee on Appropriations. These three series are designated essential titles distributed to Federal Depository Libraries and are available for purchase from the Government Publishing Office. The CBO often provides testimony in response to requests from various Congressional committees and issues letters responding to queries made by members of Congress.

== Divisions ==
The Congressional Budget Office is divided into nine divisions.

- Budget Analysis
- Financial Analysis
- Health Analysis
- Labor, Income Security, and Long-Term Analysis
- Macroeconomic Analysis
- Management, Business, and Information Services
- Microeconomic Studies
- National Security
- Tax Analysis

== Director ==
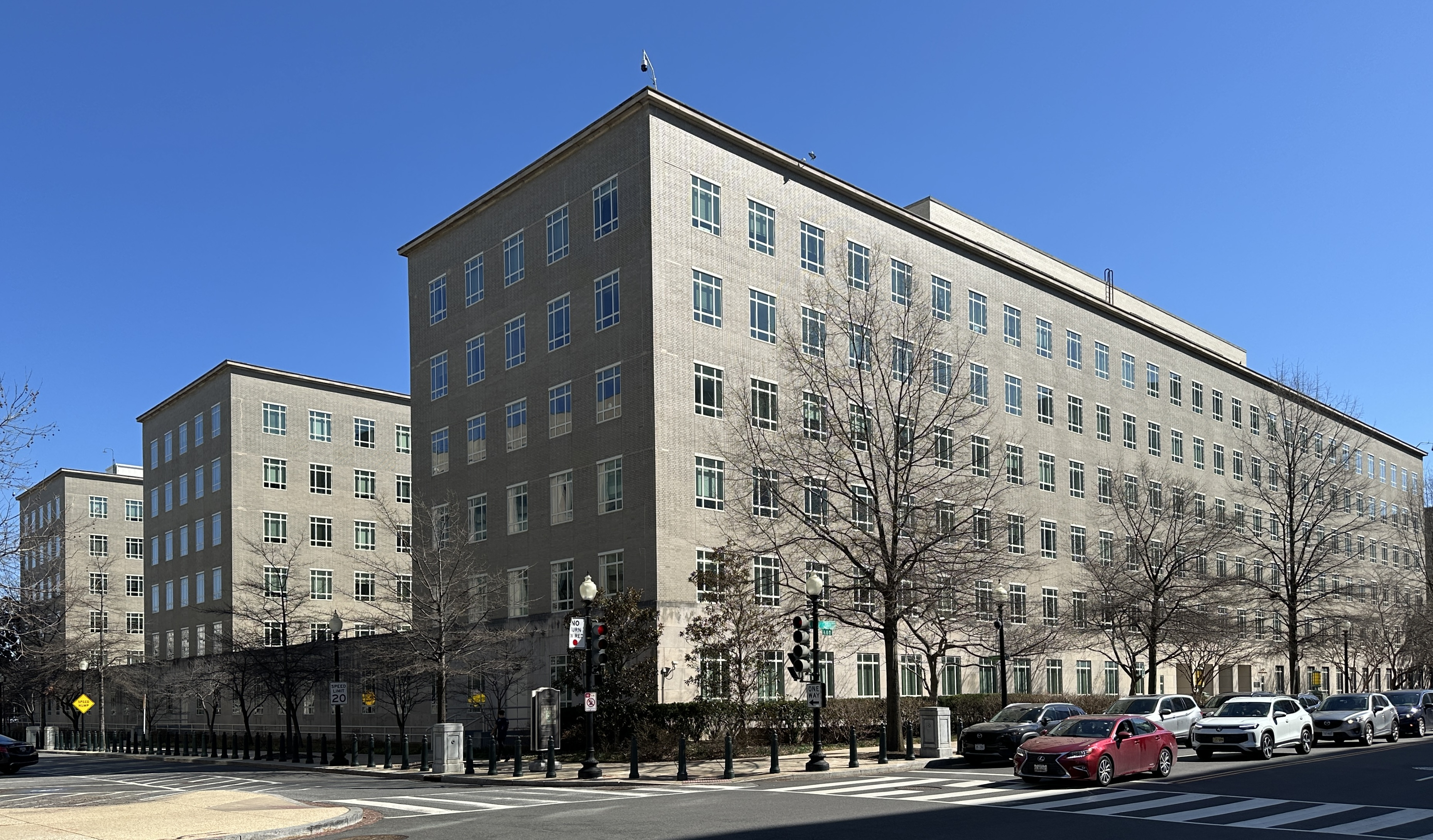
Ford House Office Building, headquarters for the CBO

The speaker of the House of Representatives and the president pro tempore of the Senate jointly appoint the CBO director after considering recommendations from the two budget committees. The term of office is four years, with no limit on the number of terms a director may serve. Either house of Congress, however, may remove the director by resolution. At the expiration of a term of office, the person serving as director may continue in the position until his or her successor is appointed. The list of directors of the CBO are:

Director	Term
Alice Rivlin	February 24, 1975 – August 31, 1983
Rudolph G. Penner	September 1, 1983 – April 28, 1987
Edward Gramlich (Acting)	April 28, 1987 – December 1987
James L. Blum (Acting)	December 1987 – March 6, 1989
Robert Reischauer	March 6, 1989 – February 28, 1995
June E. O'Neill	March 1, 1995 – January 29, 1999
James L. Blum (Acting)	January 29, 1999 – February 3, 1999
Dan Crippen	February 3, 1999 – January 3, 2003
Barry B. Anderson (Acting)	January 3, 2003 – February 5, 2003
Douglas Holtz-Eakin	February 5, 2003 – December 29, 2005
Donald B. Marron Jr. (Acting)	December 29, 2005 – January 18, 2007
Peter R. Orszag	January 18, 2007 – November 25, 2008
Robert Sunshine (Acting)	November 25, 2008 – January 22, 2009
Douglas Elmendorf	January 22, 2009 – March 31, 2015
Keith Hall	April 1, 2015 – May 31, 2019
Phillip Swagel	June 3, 2019 – present

== Reception ==
Whereas politicians on both sides of the aisle have criticized the CBO when its estimates have been politically inconvenient, economists and other academics overwhelmingly reject that the CBO is partisan or that it fails to produce credible forecasts.

A March 2017 survey of leading economists shows a consensus behind the notion that "adjusting for legal restrictions on what the CBO can assume about future legislation and events, the CBO has historically issued credible forecasts of the effects of both Democratic and Republican legislative proposals." According to MIT economist David Autor, the "CBO has a good track record with a very difficult assignment. It errs, but not systematically or with partisan intent." According to Yale economist Christopher Udry, "There is no credible evidence of partisan bias." Economist Walter E. Williams, a classical liberal, wrote in 1998 that the CBO was well-regarded for its "honest numbers" on fiscal and economic matters. According to the Los Angeles Times, "the CBO's analyses and forecasting are regarded as good or better than others doing similar work... economists say that the CBO's economic projections generally compare favorably against other outfits, and its long-term budget estimates have been fairly accurate."

According to George Washington University political scientist Sarah Binder, the CBO "has emerged over its history as a neutral analyst of congressional budgets and cost estimates for proposed legislation." The agency has "a nonpartisan staff culture".

Historically, the House Budget Committee and Senate Budget Committee have insulated the CBO from external pressures and attempts to politicize or weaken the office. Professor Philip Joyce of the University of Maryland School of Public Policy writes:

This is quite surprising, in a sense, given the partisan nature of the Congress. It is not necessarily that these partisans have embraced nonpartisanship as a positive end in itself, however. Rather, the Budget Committees (and especially their leadership and staff) have recognized that a weak CBO (one that does not have a reputation for objective analysis, and whose conclusions are viewed as partisan) is not in their interest. A weak CBO weakens the Budget Committees, and indeed weakens Congress as a whole in its inevitable battles with the executive over budget and economic policy.

== See also ==
- United States Congress
- United States federal budget
- Office of Management and Budget
- Compare:
  - Legislative Analyst's Office (California)
  - Parliamentary Budget Office (Australia)
  - Parliamentary Budget Officer (Canada)
  - National Assembly Budget Office (The Republic of Korea)
  - Office for Budget Responsibility (United Kingdom)
