= Mark W. Olson =

American economist and bank executive (1943–2018)

Mark Olson
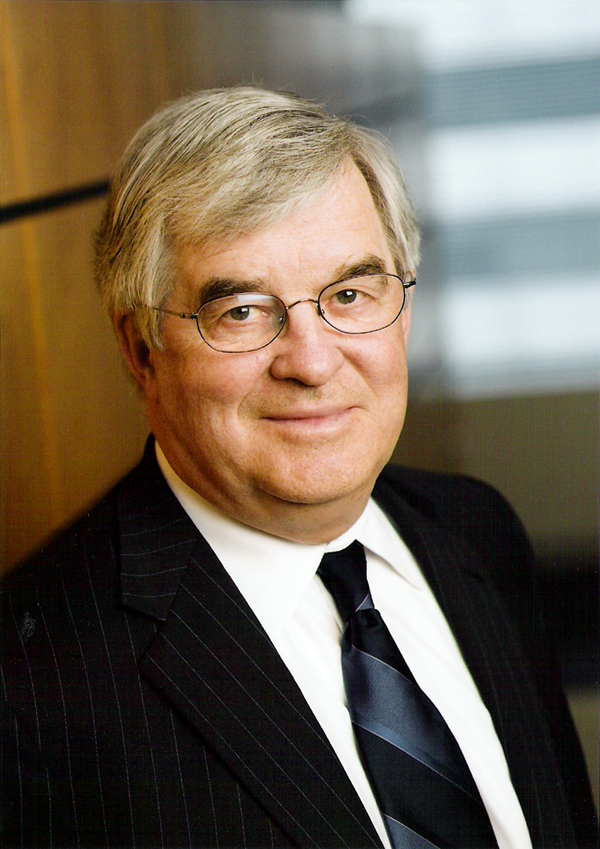

Member of the Federal Reserve Board of Governors
- In office December 7, 2001 – June 30, 2006
- President: George W. Bush
- Preceded by: Alice Rivlin
- Succeeded by: Janet Yellen

Personal details
- Born: March 17, 1943 Fergus Falls, Minnesota, U.S.
- Died: September 12, 2018 (aged 75) Rockville, Maryland, U.S.
- Party: Republican
- Education: St. Olaf College (BA)

Mark Walter Olson (March 17, 1943 – September 12, 2018) was an American economist and bank executive who served as a member of the Federal Reserve Board of Governors from 2001 to 2006. Filling an unexpired term to end on January 31, 2010, he resigned on June 21, 2006, in order to run the Public Company Accounting Oversight Board.

== Early life ==
Olson was born on March 17, 1943, in Fergus Falls, Minnesota.

In 1965, he received a B.A. in economics from St. Olaf College. In 2003, St. Olaf College named him a Distinguished Alumni.

== Career ==
In 1966, Olson began his banking career with First Bank System (now U.S. Bancorp) and was named an officer in 1969. From 1976 to 1988, he was President and CEO of Security State Bank, Fergus Falls, Minnesota. His father had been the lead organizer in chartering Security State Bank in 1957. During his years at Security State Bank, Olson was also actively involved in public policy issues involving the banking industry. He served on the American Bankers Association Board of Directors and as Chairman of the ABA Government Relations Council. In 1986, at age 43, he became the youngest person ever elected as President of the American Bankers Association.

Between 1971 and 1976, Olson served former Republican Representative Bill Frenzel of Minnesota, as Legislative Assistant for Banking Issues (1971–72), then as Director of his district office (1974–76).

From 1988 to 1999, Olson served as a partner with Ernst & Young LLP and its predecessor, Arthur Young & Company. While their, he was National Director of the firm's Regulatory Consulting Practice for the financial services industry. He also consulted on issues of management and board corporate governance, strategic planning, and management evaluation. In addition, he was selected to join a 1991–92 United States Treasury Department effort to assist Eastern European bankers in adapting to a free-market economy.

Before becoming a member of the Board, Olson served as Staff Director of the U.S. Senate Securities Subcommittee of the Banking, Housing, and Urban Affairs Committee (2000–2001). The subcommittee's legislative jurisdiction included the Securities and Exchange Commission, accounting policy issues, and the insurance industry. During Olson's tenure, the subcommittee held oversight hearings on implementation of key sections of the Gramm-Leach-Bliley Act.

In 2001, Olson was appointed by President George W. Bush to the Board of Governors of the Federal Reserve. He took office on December 7, 2001, to fill an unexpired term, to end on January 31, 2010. He resigned on June 21, 2006, effective June 30, 2006, in order to run the Public Company Accounting Oversight Board.

During his time on the Board, he served as the Board's administrative governor, as Chairman of the Board's Committee on Consumer and Community Affairs, as a member of the Committee on Supervisory and Regulatory Affairs, and as a member of the Committee on Federal Reserve Bank Affairs. In September 2005, following Hurricane Katrina, Olson dissented in a decision to raise interest rates, citing the devastation and uncertainty caused by the natural disaster.

On June 8, 2009, he announced his resignation as chairman of the PCAOB to be effective July 31, 2009, for personal reasons.

In September 2009, he became Co-Chair of Treliant Risk Advisors LLC, a compliance and strategic advisory firm for the financial services industry. He occasionally appeared on CNBC to provide insights and opinions on industry and regulatory issues.

== Personal life ==
In 2004, Olson married Renee Korda and had two children, Ben and Stephanie.

== Death ==
Mark Olson died on September 12, 2018, from pulmonary fibrosis in Rockville, Maryland.
