= Jonathan Orszag =

American economist

- Born: 1973 (age 52–53)
- Education: Princeton University (BA); St Cross College, Oxford (MSc)

Jonathan Marc Orszag is an American economist and former government official. He is a Founding Partner of Econic Partners LLC, an economic consulting firm. He previously was a co-founder of Compass Lexecon, LLC. Orszag sold Compass (or Competition Policy Associates) to FTI Consulting, Inc. (NYSE: FCN) in 2006. His work has been recognized in The International Who's Who of Competition Economists and Global Competition Review. During the Bill Clinton administration, Orszag served within the National Economic Council (NEC) as an economic policy advisor.

== Early life and education ==
Orszag is the son of Reba Karp, owner of a research and development company, and Steven Orszag, a prominent mathematician and professor at Yale University. He has two brothers, Michael Orszag and Peter Orszag, the former Director of the Office of Management and Budget. Orszag's paternal great-grandparents were Jewish immigrants from Hungary who immigrated to New York City in 1903.

Orszag graduated from Phillips Exeter Academy in 1991 and received his bachelor's degree in economics from Princeton University in 1996. In 1997, Orszag graduated from the University of Oxford with an M.Sc. in economic and social history.

== Career ==
=== Government service and political activity ===
In 1994, Orszag was appointed to serve as the Special Assistant to the Chief Economist at the U.S. Department of Labor. He next moved to the White House in 1995 to serve as an Economic Policy Advisor on President Bill Clinton's National Economic Council. In 1999, the Corporation for Enterprise Development gave Orszag its leadership award for "forging innovative public policies to expand economic opportunity in America." From 1995 to 1996, Orszag was an economic consultant to James Carville while he wrote the book We're Right, They're Wrong: A Handbook for Spirited Progressives.

Orszag served as the Assistant to the Secretary of Commerce and Director of the Office of Policy and Strategic Planning from 1999 to 2000. During the 2000 presidential election, Orszag worked on the Gore-Lieberman campaign as director of policy preparations for the vice presidential debate. From 2000 to 2003, the Governor of California appointed Orszag to both the California Workforce Investment Board and the Governor's Technology Advisory Group. In 2004, Orszag was a commentator for The Wall Street Journal, writing on economic issues of note in the 2004 presidential election.

=== Private sector ===
When Orszag left government, he founded Sebago Associates, the predecessor firm to Compass Lexecon, with his brother Peter Orszag. Orszag founded Econic Partners in 2025. Orszag has served on the Academic and Regulatory Advisory Council for Coinbase One River Asset Management.

In 2026, Orszag was named by the Global Competition Review as the Economist of the Year, which is awarded annually to the competition economist whose superior technical skill, practical judgement and excellence in client service demonstrates that they are among the very best in the field.

Orszag works on antitrust matters, including giving testimony before the European Court of First Instance in its 2007 case, Microsoft Corp v. Commission. Orszag has also worked on a number of large mergers, including Aetna/Humana, GE/Electrolux, Agrium/Potash Corporation of Saskatchewan, Orbitz/Expedia, OfficeMax/Office Depot, Staples/Office Depot, Omnicom/Publicis, Entercom/CBS Radio, AT&T/T-Mobile, Delta/Northwest, the Microsoft/Yahoo! search deal, Siemens/Dresser-Rand, and Global Crossing/Level 3. He's also served as an expert witness in the California matter, Hewlet-Packard Co. v Oracle Corp.

== Personal life ==
Orszag is married to entertainment journalist Mary Kitchen. The couple has three children. Orszag serves on boards of the Friends of the Global Fight Against AIDS, Tuberculosis, and Malaria, and the Tiger Woods Foundation. Orszag serves as a Trustee of The First Tee and was formerly a senior fellow at the Center for American Progress. He is also a member of the Good+ Foundation's Fatherhood Leadership Council.
