= Peter R. Orszag =

American economist (born 1968)

Peter Orszag
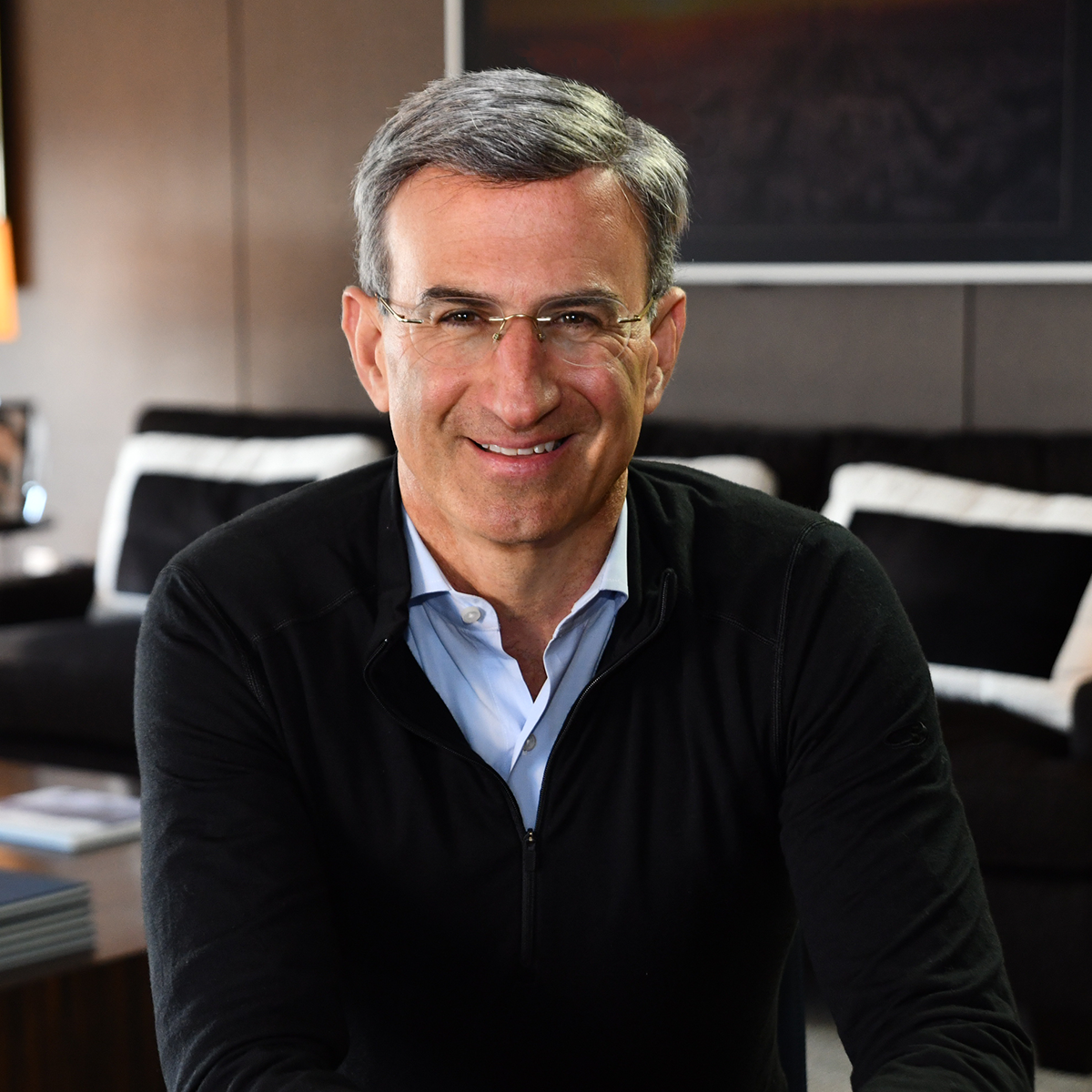
- Orszag in 2023

37th Director of the Office of Management and Budget
- In office January 20, 2009 – July 30, 2010
- President: Barack Obama
- Deputy: Rob Nabors
- Preceded by: Jim Nussle
- Succeeded by: Jeff Zients (acting)

7th Director of the Congressional Budget Office
- In office January 18, 2007 – November 25, 2008
- Preceded by: Douglas Holtz-Eakin
- Succeeded by: Douglas Elmendorf

Personal details
- Born: Peter Richard Orszag; December 16, 1968 (age 57) Boston, Massachusetts, U.S.
- Party: Democratic
- Spouses: Cameron Hamill (m. 1997; div. 2006); Bianna Golodryga (m. 2010)
- Children: 5
- Education: Princeton University (BA); London School of Economics (MS, PhD)
- Occupation: CEO, Chairman Lazard

Academic background
- Thesis: Dynamic Analysis of Regime Shifts under Uncertainty: Applications to Hyperinflation and Privatization (1997)

Peter Richard Orszag (born December 16, 1968) is an American business executive and former government official. He is the chief executive officer (CEO) and chairman of Lazard.

Orszag's past positions included being the 37th director of the Office of Management and Budget (OMB) under President Barack Obama and director of the Congressional Budget Office (CBO).

Orszag is a member of the National Academy of Medicine of the National Academies of Sciences. He is on the Boards of Directors of the Peterson Institute for International Economics, Mount Sinai Hospital, and the Institute for Advanced Study.

== Early life ==
Orszag grew up in Lexington, Massachusetts, the son of Reba (née Karp) and Steven Orszag, the president and owner of a research and development company and a math professor, respectively. His paternal great-grandparents were Jewish immigrants from Hungary who immigrated to New York City in 1903. His brother is Jonathan Orszag.

After graduating from Phillips Exeter Academy with high honors (1987), Orszag earned an A.B. in economics from Princeton University in 1991. He then received a M.Sc. (1992) and a Ph.D. (1997) in economics from the London School of Economics on the Marshall Scholarship. He was a Marshall Scholar 1991–1992, and is a member of Phi Beta Kappa.

== Career ==
=== Early years ===
Orszag became a lecturer at the University of California, Berkeley, and taught macroeconomics in 1999 and 2000. He then became a senior fellow and deputy director of economic studies at the Brookings Institution. In 2006 he co-founded and directed The Hamilton Project and was its first director. He was also director of the Pew Charitable Trust's Retirement Security Project.

He was Special Assistant to the President for Economic Policy (1997–1998), and as Senior Economist and Senior Adviser on the Council of Economic Advisers (1995–1996) during the Clinton administration. After leaving the Clinton White House, he formed a consulting group called Sebago Associates, which merged into Competition Policy Associates and was bought by FTI Consulting Inc. for a reported $70 million in 2005. He has been a columnist at Bloomberg Opinion.

=== Congressional Budget Office (2007-2008) ===
Orszag was director of the Congressional Budget Office from January 2007 to November 2008. During his time at the CBO, he added 20 full-time health analysts (bringing the total number to 50).

He was widely praised for his time at CBO for preparing the agency for the debates to come.

=== Office of Management and Budget (2008-2011) ===
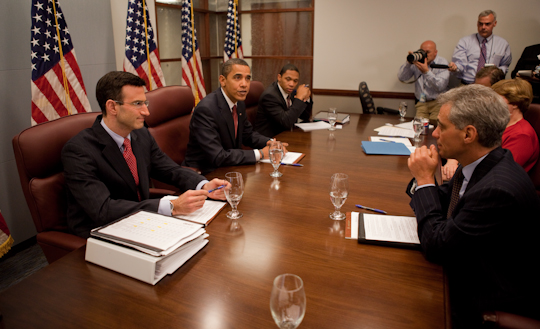
2009 budget meeting

On November 25, 2008, President-elect Barack Obama announced that Orszag would be his nominee for director of the Office of Management and Budget, the arm of the White House responsible for crafting the federal budget and overseeing the effectiveness of federal programs.

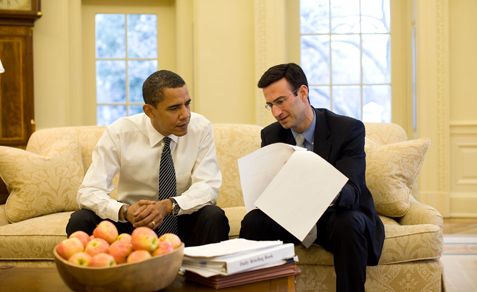
Peter Orszag with President Obama in the Oval Office in January 2009

He was invited to attend the Bilderberg Group conferences in 2010, 2011 and 2012. He was also a Distinguished Visiting Fellow at the Council on Foreign Relations and a contributing columnist for the New York Times op-ed page.

In July 2010 Orszag said that "The problem now is weak growth and high unemployment rather than outright economic collapse". Still, the deficit would be equivalent to 10 percent of the gross domestic product, the highest level since World War II. The Office of Management and Budget's mid-session review, forecast a smaller deficit and stronger economic growth than the administration's initial budget release. The deficit forecast in 2011 increased to $1.42 trillion, up from the $1.27 estimate in February. For 2012, the deficit estimate rose to $922 billion, up from $828 billion in the previous report. The annual budget shortfall would bottom out in 2017 at $721 billion, or 3.4 percent of GDP, and begin rising again in following years.

=== Citigroup (2011-2016) ===
After leaving the Obama administration, Orszag took a job with Citigroup in 2011. Orszag held two jobs at Citigroup: Vice Chairman of Corporate and Investment Banking and Chairman of the Financial Strategy and Solutions Group. While remaining Citigroup's Vice Chair of Corporate and Investment Banking as well as Chairman of Citigroup's Financial Strategy and Solutions Group, in 2015, he rejoined the Brookings Institution as a non-resident senior fellow of the Economic Studies program.

=== Lazard (2016-present) ===
In May 2016, Orszag joined Lazard as Vice Chairman of Investment Banking and managing director. He was named Global Co-Head of Healthcare in July 2018, and subsequently Head of North American M&A. Before June 2019, he was the firm's Head of North American M&A and Global Co-Head of Healthcare. Orszag took over as CEO of Lazard's Financial Advisory in April 2019, overseeing the firm's advisory work for corporations and governments. He created Lazard Geopolitical Advisory in 2022 while CEO of Lazard's Financial Advisory. Also while in the role, he expanded data analytics and AI for the firm's banking and asset management businesses.

Orszag was announced as the future CEO of Lazard in early 2023. In September 2023, Orszag said his aim as CEO would include doubling Lazard's revenue by 2030. Orszag assumed the position of Lazard CEO on October 1, 2023. He announced plans in late 2023 to expand Lazard's managing directors by ten per year. He recruited former PayPal CEO Dan Schulman to the Lazard board in January 2024, when he also oversaw the board appointment of former Ernst & Young chairman Stephen R. Howe Jr. In mid 2024, Bloomberg reported that Orszag was eyeing the acquisition of firms particularly in the fields of private credit, infrastructure, and real estate. Effective January 1, 2025, his role expanded to serve as both CEO and chairman.

In the two quarters following Orszag becoming CEO, the firm generated almost $1 billion in fees from deals. The following year, Orszag was appointed to the Board of Trustees of the Institute for Advanced Study, alongside astrophysicist Victoria Kaspi and attorney Kevin L. MacMillan.

== Personal life ==
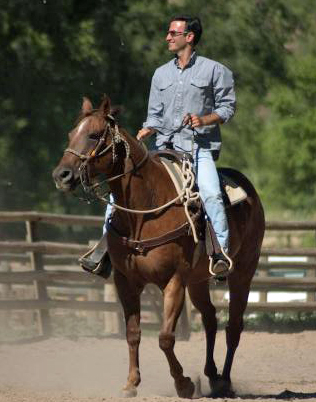
At Sylvan Dale Ranch in 2010

Orszag's first wife was Cameron Rachel Hamill. They had two children before divorcing. In 2009, he fathered a child with his former girlfriend, Claire Milonas, daughter of shipping magnate Spiros Milonas. In 2010, Orszag married Bianna Golodryga, then co-host of ABC's GMA Weekend. They have a son and a daughter. Orszag is Jewish. In 2014, a judge ruled in Orszag's favor in a child support case brought by his first wife.

== Bibliography ==
- Orszag, Peter. Dynamic analysis of regime shifts under uncertainty: Applications to hyperinflation and privatization (PhD thesis). (London School of Economics and Political Science: 1997)
- Orszag, Peter, et al. American Economic Policy in the 1990s (MIT Press: 2002)
- Orszag, Peter, et al. Protecting the American Homeland: A Preliminary Analysis (Brookings Institution Press: 2002)
- Orszag, Peter, et al. Saving Social Security: A Balanced Approach (Brookings Institution Press: 2004)
- Orszag, Peter and Diamond, Peter, Saving Social Security: The Diamond-Orszag Plan (Brookings Institution: Apr. 2005)
- Orszag, Peter, et al. Protecting the Homeland 2006/7 (Brookings Institution Press: 2006)
- Orszag, Peter, et al. Aging Gracefully: Ideas to Improve Retirement Security in America (Century Foundation Press: 2006)

Government offices
| Preceded by Donald Marron; Acting | Director of the Congressional Budget Office; 2007–2008 | Succeeded by Robert Sunshine; Acting |
Political offices
| Preceded by Jim Nussle | Director of the Office of Management and Budget; 2009–2010 | Succeeded by Jeff Zients; Acting |
