= Steven Orszag =

American mathematician (1943–2011)

- Born: Steven Alan Orszag; February 27, 1943; New York, New York
- Died: May 1, 2011 (aged 68); New Haven, Connecticut
- Education: Massachusetts Institute of Technology (SB), St. John's College, Cambridge U. ( Postgrad); Princeton University (PhD)
- Occupations: Applied mathematician, educator
- Known for: Spectral method
- Spouse: Reba Karp (m. June 21, 1964)
- Children: J. Michael Orszag; Peter Richard Orszag; Jonathan Marc Orszag
- Parent(s): Joseph and Rose Orszag.
- Awards: A.P. Sloan Found. fellow, 1970–1974; Guggenheim fellow, 1989–1990
- Scientific career
- Thesis: Theory of Turbulence (1966)
- Doctoral advisor: Martin David Kruskal

Steven Alan Orszag (February 27, 1943 – May 1, 2011) was an American mathematician.

== Life and career ==
Orszag was born to a Jewish family in Manhattan, the son of Joseph Orszag, a lawyer. Orszag's paternal grandparents were emigrants from Hungary. Orszag was raised in Forest Hills, Queens and graduated from Forest Hills High School. In 1962, at the age of 19, he graduated with a B.S. in Mathematics from the Massachusetts Institute of Technology where he was a member of the Pi Lambda Phi fraternity. He did post graduate study at Cambridge University and in 1966 graduated with a Ph.D. in astrophysics from Princeton University. His thesis adviser was Martin David Kruskal. In 1967, Orszag was appointed as a professor of applied mathematics at the Massachusetts Institute of Technology, where he collaborated with Carl M. Bender, and was a Member of the Institute for Advanced Study. In 1984, he was appointed Forrest E Hamrick Professor of Engineering at Princeton University. In 1998, he accepted a position at Yale University and in 2000, he was named the Percey F. Smith Professor of Mathematics at Yale University from 2000 until his death in 2011.

Orszag has won numerous awards including Sloan Fellowship and Guggenheim Fellowship, the American Institute of Aeronautics and Astronautics Fluid and Plasmadynamics Award, the Otto Laporte Award of the American Physical Society, and the Society of Engineering Science's G. I. Taylor Medal.

Orszag specialized in fluid dynamics, especially turbulence, computational physics and mathematics, electronic chip manufacturing, computer storage system design, and other topics in scientific computing. His work included the development of spectral methods, pseudo-spectral methods, direct numerical simulations, renormalization group methods for turbulence, and very-large-eddy simulations. He was the founder of and/or chief scientific adviser to a number of companies, including Flow Research, Ibrix (now part of HPQ), Vector Technologies, and Exa Corp. He has been awarded 6 patents and has written over 400 archival papers.

With Carl M. Bender he wrote Advanced Mathematical Methods for Scientists and Engineers: Asymptotic Methods and Perturbation Theory, a standard text on mathematical methods for scientists. Orszag has been listed as an ISI Highly Cited Author in Engineering by the ISI Web of Knowledge, Thomson Scientific Company.

=== Personal life ===
In 1964, he married Reba Karp (sister of Joel Karp, the co-designer of the Intel 1103 chip); they had three sons: Michael, Peter, and Jonathan. Peter and Jonathan were both Marshall Scholars.
