= Allan C. G. Mitchell =

American physicist

Allan Charles Gray Mitchell (1902 – November 7, 1963) was an American physicist. He was a professor and head of the Indiana University Bloomington department of physics. From 1943 to 1947, Mitchell served on the Council of the American Physical Society. He served for three terms as the president of the Midwestern Universities Research Association.

Mitchell was born in 1902, the son of Milly Gray (Dumble) and astronomer Samuel Alfred Mitchell. He earned a master of arts in physics from University of Virginia in 1924. He completed his doctorate in physical chemistry at California Institute of Technology from 1924 to 1927. His advisor was Richard C. Tolman. He completed postdoctoral work in physics with James Franck and Arnold Sommerfeld.

He was the father of economist Alice Rivlin.
